= Kynurenine 3-monooxygenase =

Enzyme

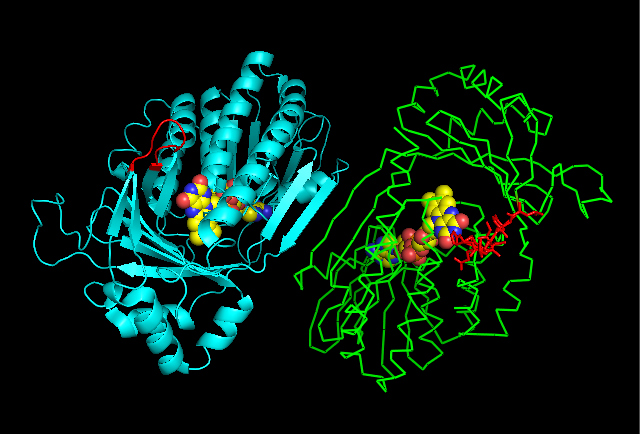
- Structure of the kynurenine 3-monooxygenase dimer, generated from 4J34. One monomer is depicted in cartoon format (cyan) and the second monomer is displayed in ribbon format (green). The flexible linker regions (residues 96-104) are colored red. Flavin adenine dinucleotide (FAD) is shown as spheres color-coded according to atom type.

Identifiers
- EC no.: 1.14.13.9
- CAS no.: 9029-61-2

Databases
- BRENDA: enzyme data
- ExPASy: NiceZyme view
- KEGG: enzyme entry
- MetaCyc: metabolic pathway
- Rhea: reactions
- PDB structures: RCSB PDB PDBe PDBsum
- Gene Ontology: AmiGO / QuickGO
Search
- PMC: articles
- PubMed: articles
- NCBI: proteins

KMO

Identifiers
- Aliases: KMO, dJ317G22.1, kynurenine 3-monooxygenase (kynurenine 3-hydroxylase), kynurenine 3-monooxygenase
- External IDs: OMIM: 603538; MGI: 2138151; GeneCards: KMO
Enzyme activity
EC #	BRENDA	ExPASy	KEGG	MetaCyc
1.14.13.9	↗	↗	↗	↗

Gene location (Human)
Chr.	Chromosome 1 (human)
Band	1q43	Start	241,532,134 bp
Band	1q43	End	241,595,642 bp

Gene location (Mouse)
Chr.	Chromosome 1 (mouse)
Band	1|1 H3	Start	175,447,947 bp
Band	1|1 H3	End	175,489,682 bp
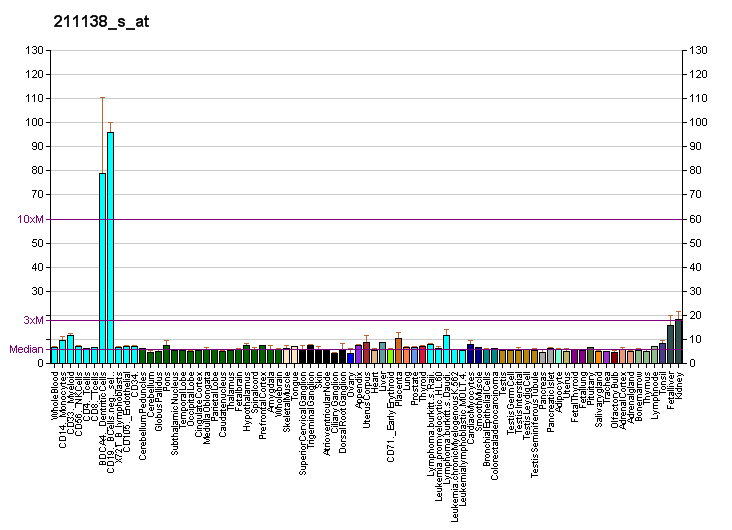

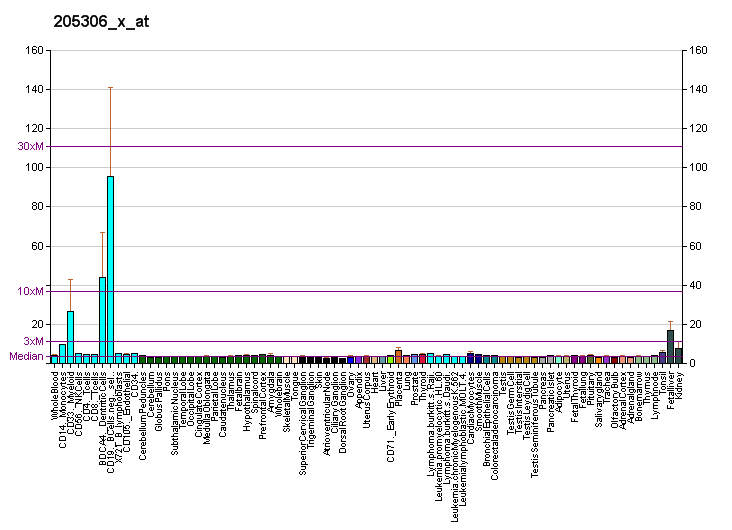

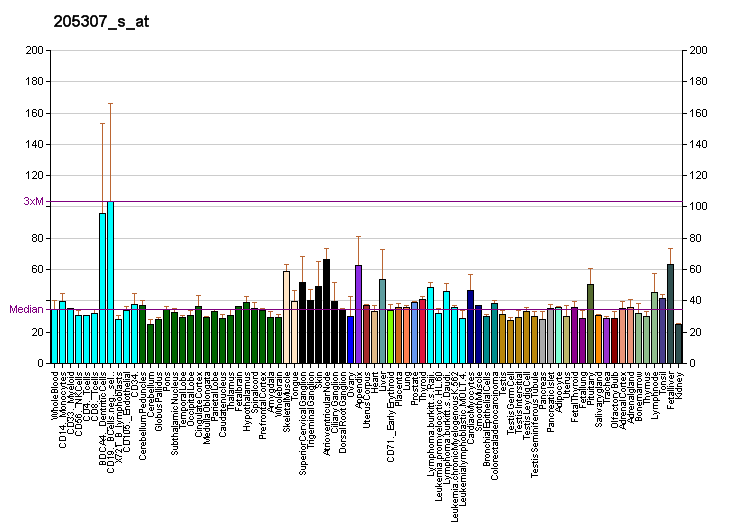
RNA expression pattern
Bgee	Human / Mouse (ortholog); Top expressed in: right lobe of liver; palpebral conjunctiva; kidney tubule; testicle; glomerulus; metanephric glomerulus; placenta; monocyte; human kidney; granulocyte / Top expressed in: left lobe of liver; right kidney; human kidney; proximal tubule; spleen; mesenteric lymph nodes; blood; yolk sac; lumbar subsegment of spinal cord; bone marrow; More reference expression data
BioGPS	More reference expression data
Gene ontology
Molecular function	NAD(P)H oxidase H2O2-forming activity; monooxygenase activity; oxidoreductase activity; kynurenine 3-monooxygenase activity; flavin adenine dinucleotide binding; FAD binding
Cellular component	integral component of membrane; cytosol; membrane; mitochondrial outer membrane; mitochondrion; mitochondrial membranes; extracellular space
Biological process	pyridine nucleotide biosynthetic process; NAD biosynthetic process; response to salt stress; secondary metabolite biosynthetic process; quinolinate biosynthetic process; tryptophan catabolic process; response to lipopolysaccharide; cellular response to interleukin-1; L-kynurenine metabolic process; positive regulation of neuron death; positive regulation of glutamate secretion, neurotransmission; NAD metabolic process; kynurenine metabolic process; 'de novo' NAD biosynthetic process from tryptophan; anthranilate metabolic process; ageing; positive regulation of glutamate secretion; kynurenic acid biosynthetic process; cellular response to lipopolysaccharide
Sources:Amigo / QuickGO
Orthologs
Databases	NCBI: entry; OMA: entry
Species	Human	Mouse
Entrez	8564	98256
Ensembl	ENSG00000117009	ENSMUSG00000039783
UniProt	O15229	Q91WN4
RefSeq (mRNA)	NM_003679	NM_133809
RefSeq (protein)	NP_003670	NP_598570
Location (UCSC)	Chr 1: 241.53 – 241.6 Mb	Chr 1: 175.45 – 175.49 Mb
PubMed search
- Wikidata
View/Edit Human	View/Edit Mouse

Kynurenine 3-monooxygenase (EC 1.14.13.9) is an enzyme that in humans is encoded by the KMO gene. The systematic name of this enzyme class is L-kynurenine, NADPH:oxygen oxidoreductase (3-hydroxylating). Other names in common use include kynurenine 3-hydroxylase, kynurenine hydroxylase, and L-kynurenine-3-hydroxylase.

== Function ==
Kynurenine 3-monooxygenase catalyzes the chemical reaction

kynurenine
+ NADPH
O_{2} + H^{+}
H_{2}O
3-hydroxykynurenine
+ NADP^{+}

It participates in tryptophan metabolism through the kynurenine catabolic pathway. This enzyme belongs to the family of oxidoreductases, to be specific, those acting on paired donors, with O_{2} as the oxidant. Kynurenine 3-monooxygenase catalyzes the insertion of molecular oxygen into the aromatic ring of kynurenine to produce 3-hydroxy-L-kynurenine. It employs one cofactor, FAD. Kynurenine 3-monooxygenase serves as an important branch point in the kynurenine pathway and, as a result, is an attractive drug target for immunological, neurodegenerative, and neuroinflammatory diseases. Currently, most research on the kynurenine 3-monooxygenase enzyme has been focused primarily on rat models and in yeast, both of which have been demonstrated to have high sequence homology with the human kynurenine 3-monooxygenase protein. Studies have shown the beneficial effects of enzyme inhibition in these eukaryotic kynurenine 3-monooxygenase active sites, thus making this enzyme an attractive target for human drug design.

== Structure ==
Kynurenine 3-monooxygenase is a dimer containing asymmetric subunits and has one FAD-binding domain as its prosthetic group. Kynurenine 3-monooxygenase contains a linker region involved in substrate binding following a second strand of an antiparallel β-sheet, a six-stranded antiparallel β-sheet domain, and an α-helix at the carboxy-terminal. The hydrophobic C-terminus acts as the mitochondrial anchoring domain and participates in enzymatic activity.

== Active site ==
While no scientific literature reports a crystal image of a kynurenine 3-monooxygenase complex with L-kynurenine, structural studies of the enzyme in yeast co-crystallized with UPF 648 reveal how the FAD cofactor and substrate are bound in the active site. Chemical similarities between UPF 648 and L-kynurenine suggest that the substrate binds adjacent to the Re-face of the flavoprotein. A loop containing the residues Pro_{321}–Gln_{325} is believed to be the oxygen-binding site above the re-side of the FAD prosthetic group.

Each monomer contains a conserved hydrophobic pocket (residues Leu_{221}, Met_{230}, Ile_{232}, Leu_{234}, Phe_{246}, Pro_{321}, Phe_{322}) positioned around the substrate's aromatic benzene moiety. A conserved Gln_{325} polar residue is also involved in hydrogen bonding on the L-kynurenine carbonyl group, as well as on the hydrogen on the FAD N3 atom. Arg_{83} and Tyr_{97} also form polar contacts with the carboxylate in the amino acid moiety on the substrate.

== Mechanism ==
Kynurenine-3-monooxygenase catalyzes the hydroxylation of L-kynurenine to 3-hydroxy-L-kynurenine with concomitant interconversion of NADPH to NADP^{+}. The reaction mechanism is not entirely known, but is believed to follow mechanisms related to the flavin-dependent monooxygenases. After L-kynurenine binds, NADPH reduces FAD and leaves as NADP^{+}. Oxygen then binds and creates an L-kynurenine-FAD-hydroperoxide intermediate. This intermediate is the electrophilic source for the hydroxylation reaction, yielding a primary ketimine form of the product and the C4a-hydroxy-FAD. Tautomerization yields 3-hydroxy-L-kynurenine in complex with the enzyme (E Fl HOH-P). Dissociation of 3-hydroxy-L-kynurenine and H_{2}O leads to the free enzyme (E Fl_{ox}).

The mechanism of kynurenine 3-monooxygenase FAD is shown in blue. The substrate, intermediate, and product are depicted in black.

== Biological function ==
Kynurenine 3-monooxygenase catalyzes the conversion of L-kynurenine to 3-hydroxy-L-kynurenine, an important bioactive metabolite in the kynurenine pathway. The kynurenine pathway is responsible for over 95% of tryptophan oxidative degradation. L-Kynurenine is an important branch point of this metabolic pathway, being converted into the neurotoxin 3-hydroxy-L-kynurenine via kynurenine 3-monooxygenase, the neuroprotectant kynurenic acid through kynurenine amino transferases, or anthranilic acid by kynureninase.

Kynurenine 3-monooxygenase regulates the downstream production of quinolinic acid, which can generate reactive free radicals and activates the NMDA subtype of glutamate receptors, producing excitotoxic lesions in the central nervous system of mammals. Quinolinic acid is also the bioprecursor of NAD^{+}.

Inhibition of kynurenine 3-monooxygenase leads to an increase of kynurenic acid in the kynurenine pathway. This metabolite functions as an antagonist of the α7 nicotinic acetylcholine receptor and as an antagonist at the glycine site of the NMDA receptor. As a result, regulation at the kynurenine 3-monooxygenase enzyme determines the neurotoxic and neuroprotective potential of the kynurenine pathway.

== Disease relevance ==
Kynurenine 3-monooxygenase is an attractive drug target for several neurodegenerative and neuroinflammatory diseases, especially Huntington's, Alzheimer's, and Parkinson's disease. Administration of potent enzyme inhibitors has demonstrated promising pharmacological results. Specifically, genetic elimination of the kynurenine 3-monooxygenase enzyme has been shown to suppress toxicity of the huntingtin protein in yeast and Drosophila models of Huntington's disease.

Kynurenine 3-monooxygenase deficiency, which can be caused by genetic polymorphisms, cytokines, or both, leads to an accumulation of kynurenine and to a shift within the tryptophan metabolic pathway towards kynurenic acid and anthranilic acid. Recent research suggests that hyperphysiologic concentrations of kynurenine in kynurenine 3-monooxygenase-deficient patients results in a shift towards kynurenic acid production, believed to be related to cognitive deficits in predictive pursuit and visuospatial working memory. Kynurenine-3-monooxygenase deficiency is associated with disorders of the brain (e.g. schizophrenia, tic disorders) and of the liver.
