= Kynurenine—glyoxylate transaminase =

Kynurenine-glyoxylate transaminase

Identifiers
- EC no.: 2.6.1.63
- CAS no.: 74506-33-5

Databases
- IntEnz: IntEnz view
- BRENDA: BRENDA entry
- ExPASy: NiceZyme view
- KEGG: KEGG entry
- MetaCyc: metabolic pathway
- PRIAM: profile
- PDB structures: RCSB PDB PDBe PDBsum
- Gene Ontology: AmiGO / QuickGO
Search
- PMC: articles
- PubMed: articles
- NCBI: proteins

Kynurenine-glyoxylate transaminase (EC 2.6.1.63) is an enzyme that catalyzes the overall chemical reaction:

kynurenine
+
glyoxylic acid
H_{2}O
kynurenic acid
+
glycine

The two substrates of this enzyme characterised from liver are L-kynurenine and glyoxylic acid. The amino group from the amino acid of kynurenine is transferred, forming glycine and an intermediate α-keto acid, which spontaneously loses water to give kynurenic acid as the stable product. The enzyme accepts other substrates, including alanine and 3-hydroxykynurenine. It is found in Aedes aegypti and Anopheles gambiae.

This enzyme is a transferase, specifically a transaminase, which transfer nitrogenous groups. The systematic name of this enzyme class is L-kynurenine:glyoxylate aminotransferase (cyclizing). This enzyme is also called kynurenine-glyoxylate aminotransferase.
