= Epacadostat =

Chemical compound

Clinical data
- ATC code: L01XX58 (WHO)

Identifiers
- IUPAC name: (Z)-N-(3-Bromo-4-fluorophenyl)-N'-hydroxy-4-{[2-(sulfamoylamino)ethyl]amino}-1,2,5-oxadiazole-3-carboximidamide
- CAS Number: 1204669-58-8
- DrugBank: DB11717
- ChemSpider: 34448418
- UNII: 71596A9R13
- KEGG: D11049

Chemical and physical data
- Formula: C_{11}H_{13}BrFN_{7}O_{4}S
- Molar mass: 438.23 g·mol^{−1}
- 3D model (JSmol): Interactive image
- SMILES: c1cc(c(cc1N/C(=N\O)/c2c(non2)NCCNS(=O)(=O)N)Br)F
- InChI: InChI=1S/C11H13BrFN7O4S/c12-7-5-6(1-2-8(7)13)17-11(18-21)9-10(20-24-19-9)15-3-4-16-25(14,22)23/h1-2,5,16,21H,3-4H2,(H,15,20)(H,17,18)(H2,14,22,23); Key:FBKMWOJEPMPVTQ-UHFFFAOYSA-N

Epacadostat (previously INCB24360) is an investigational drug for cancer. Epacadostat is an inhibitor of indoleamine 2,3-dioxygenase-1 (IDO1). Epacadostat inhibits IDO1 by competitively blocking it, without interfering with IDO2 or tryptophan 2,3-dioxygenase (TDO). It has antitumor activity in some models, though is most effective when combined with other immunotherapy agents.

== History and clinical trials ==
As of 2017, the combination of epacadostat with pembrolizumab (Keytruda) was being investigated by Incyte and Merck & Co. in several cancers, as was the combination of epacadostat with nivolumab (Opdivo) by Incyte and Bristol Myers Squibb.

In April 2018, Incyte announced they were halting the Phase III ECHO-301/KEYNOTE-252 (NCT02752074) trial of epacadostat with pembrolizumab for melanoma as the combination therapy missed the first primary endpoint of improving progression-free survival vs. pembrolizumab alone. The second primary endpoint of overall survival is not yet determined.
