= N'-Formylkynurenine =

N′-Formylkynurenine

Names
- Systematic IUPAC name (2S)-2-Amino-4-(2-formamidophenyl)-4-oxobutanoic acid
- Other names N′-Formyl-L-kynurenine

Identifiers
CAS Number	3978-11-8
3D model (JSmol)	Interactive image
ChEBI	CHEBI:30249
ChEMBL	ChEMBL3577708
ChemSpider	388843
KEGG	C02700
MeSH	N'-formylkynurenine
PubChem CID	439788
UNII	PS20W0733S
- InChI: InChI=1S/C11H12N2O4/c12-8(11(16)17)5-10(15)7-3-1-2-4-9(7)13-6-14/h1-4,6,8H,5,12H2,(H,13,14)(H,16,17)/t8-/m0/s1 Key: BYHJHXPTQMMKCA-QMMMGPOBSA-N
- SMILES: C1=CC=C(C(=C1)C(=O)C[C@@H](C(=O)O)N)NC=O

Properties
Chemical formula	C_{11}H_{12}N_{2}O_{4}
Molar mass	236.227 g·mol^{−1}
- Except where otherwise noted, data are given for materials in their standard state (at 25 °C [77 °F], 100 kPa). Infobox references

N′-Formylkynurenine is an intermediate in the catabolism of tryptophan. It is a formylated derivative of kynurenine. The formation of N′-formylkynurenine is catalyzed by heme dioxygenases.

== Biosynthesis ==
The enzyme indoleamine 2,3-dioxygenase is the first and rate-limiting enzyme of tryptophan catabolism through the kynurenine pathway.

Tryptophan
O_{2}
N'-Formylkynurenine

Related enzymes performing a similar function are Indoleamine 2,3-dioxygenase 2 and tryptophan 2,3-dioxygenase.

== Metabolism ==
In the main sequence of the kynurenine pathway, the formyl group is removed by the enzyme arylformamidase, giving the compound after which the pathway is named:

N'-Formylkynurenine
H_{2}O
kynurenine
+
formic acid

Alternatively, the enzyme kynureninase can produce N-formylanthranilic acid and L-alanine:

N'-Formylkynurenine
H_{2}O
N-formylanthranilic acid
+
alanine
