= Hydroxykynurenic acid =

Hydroxykynurenic acid may refer to:

- 3-Hydroxykynurenic acid
- 6-Hydroxykynurenic acid
- 8-Hydroxykynurenic acid (xanthurenic acid)
