= C10H7NO4 =

The molecular formula C_{10}H_{7}NO_{4} (molar mass: 205.17 g/mol, exact mass: 205.0375 u) may refer to:

- 6-Hydroxykynurenic acid
- Xanthurenic acid, or xanthurenate
