= Arylformamidase =

Identifiers
- EC no.: 3.5.1.9
- CAS no.: 156229-75-3

Databases
- IntEnz: IntEnz view
- BRENDA: BRENDA entry
- ExPASy: NiceZyme view
- KEGG: KEGG entry
- MetaCyc: metabolic pathway
- PRIAM: profile
- PDB structures: RCSB PDB PDBe PDBsum
- Gene Ontology: AmiGO / QuickGO
Search
- PMC: articles
- PubMed: articles
- NCBI: proteins

Arylformamidase (EC 3.5.1.9, AFMID) is an enzyme that catalyzes the chemical reaction

N'-Formylkynurenine
H_{2}O
kynurenine
+
formic acid

The two substrates of this enzyme are N'-formylkynurenine and water. Its products are kynurenine and formic acid.

This enzyme belongs to the family of hydrolases, those acting on carbon-nitrogen bonds other than peptide bonds, specifically in linear amides. The systematic name of this enzyme class is aryl-formylamine amidohydrolase. Other names in common use include kynurenine formamidase, formylase, formylkynureninase, formylkynurenine formamidase, formamidase I, and formamidase II. This enzyme participates in tryptophan metabolism in the kynurenine pathway and glyoxylate and dicarboxylate metabolism.
