= Kynurenine 7,8-hydroxylase =

kynurenine 7,8-hydroxylase

Identifiers
- EC no.: 1.14.99.2
- CAS no.: 9029-63-4

Databases
- IntEnz: IntEnz view
- BRENDA: BRENDA entry
- ExPASy: NiceZyme view
- KEGG: KEGG entry
- MetaCyc: metabolic pathway
- PRIAM: profile
- PDB structures: RCSB PDB PDBe PDBsum
- Gene Ontology: AmiGO / QuickGO
Search
- PMC: articles
- PubMed: articles
- NCBI: proteins

In enzymology, a kynurenine 7,8-hydroxylase (EC 1.14.99.2) is an enzyme that catalyzes the chemical reaction

kynurenate + AH_{2} + O_{2} $\rightleftharpoons$ 7,8-dihydro-7,8-dihydroxykynurenate + A

The 3 substrates of this enzyme are kynurenate, an electron acceptor AH_{2}, and O_{2}, whereas its two products are 7,8-dihydro-7,8-dihydroxykynurenate and the reduction product A.

This enzyme belongs to the family of oxidoreductases, specifically those acting on paired donors, with O2 as oxidant and incorporation or reduction of oxygen. The oxygen incorporated need not be derive from O miscellaneous. The systematic name of this enzyme class is kynurenate,hydrogen-donor:oxygen oxidoreductase (hydroxylating). Other names in common use include kynurenic acid hydroxylase, kynurenic hydroxylase, and kynurenate 7,8-hydroxylase. This enzyme participates in tryptophan metabolism.
