= Ommochrome =

Chemical structure of xanthommatin, a common ommochrome

Ommochrome (or filtering pigment) refers to several biological pigments that occur in the eyes of crustaceans and insects. The eye color is determined by the ommochromes. Ommochromes are also found in the chromatophores of cephalopods, and in spiders.

Ommochromes are metabolites of tryptophan, via kynurenine and 3-hydroxykynurenine. They are responsible for a wide variety of colors, ranging from yellow over red and brown to black. Lighter colors tend to be generated by ommatins, while mixtures of ommatin and ommins are responsible for darker colors.

In spiders, ommochromes are usually deposited as pigment granules within the cells of the hypodermis, immediately beneath the cuticle.

A study on various insects showed that ommochromes in their eyes have high antioxidant activity. The ommochromes were found to have the ability to suppress the Maillard reaction.

== Anti-radical capacity ==
Due to the chemical properties exhibited in the chromophoric groups of ommochromes, these substances have been proven to be satisfactory in functioning as free radicals. In testing the anti-radical capacity of ommochromes, their electron transfer and hydrogen transfer mechanisms were examined, and it was shown that ommochromes possesses the ability to prevent oxidative stress by scavenging free radicals. Results regarding this study were quantified using a full-electron donor acceptor map (FEDAM) which allowed for optimal discretion in evaluating anti-radical capacity.

== See also ==
- Opsin
