= Aminotransferase, class V domain =

Protein family

Aminotransferase class-V

Identifiers
- Symbol: Aminotran_5
- Pfam: PF00266
- InterPro: IPR000192
- PROSITE: PDOC00514
- SCOP2: 1bjo / SCOPe / SUPFAM
- CDD: cd00611
Available protein structures:
- PDB: 1qz9A:30-392 1i29A:25-394 1c0nA:25-394 1jf9A:25-394 1kmjA:25-394 1t3iB:30-402 1eluB:97-273 1n31B:97-273 1elqB:97-273 1n2tA:97-273 1ecxB:3-365 1eg5B:3-365 1p3wA:5-369 2bkwA:8-370 1h0cA:23-376 1j04A:23-376 1vjoA:23-372 1iugB:2-337 1m32A:117-192 1bjnB:4-350 2bhxB:5-350 2biaA:5-350 2bi2A:5-350 2bi9A:5-350 2bigB:5-350 2bieA:5-350 2bi3B:5-350 2bi5B:5-350 1w23A:5-350 2bi1A:5-350 1w3uA:5-350 1bt4A:5-350 IPR000192 PF00266 (ECOD; PDBsum)
- AlphaFold: IPR000192; PF00266

Aminotransferase class-V is an evolutionary conserved protein domain. This domain is found in amino transferases, and other enzymes including cysteine desulphurase EC:4.4.1.-.

Aminotransferases share certain mechanistic features with other pyridoxal- phosphate dependent enzymes, such as the covalent binding of the pyridoxal- phosphate group to a lysine residue. On the basis of sequence similarity, these various enzymes can be grouped into subfamilies. This family is called class-V.

== Subfamilies ==
- Phosphoserine aminotransferase InterPro: IPR003248
- Cysteine desulfurase InterPro: IPR010240
- Cysteine desulphurase related, unknown function InterPro: IPR010969
- Cysteine desulphurases, SufS InterPro: IPR010970
- Cysteine desulphurase related InterPro: IPR011340
- 2-aminoethylphosphonate—pyruvate transaminase InterPro: IPR012703

== Human proteins containing this domain ==
AGXT; KYNU; MOCOS; NFS1; PSAT1; SCLY; TLH6;
