= L-aspartate oxidase =

Identifiers
- EC no.: 1.4.3.16
- CAS no.: 69106-47-4

Databases
- BRENDA: enzyme data
- ExPASy: NiceZyme view
- KEGG: enzyme entry
- MetaCyc: metabolic pathway
- Rhea: reactions
- PDB structures: RCSB PDB PDBe PDBsum
- Gene Ontology: AmiGO / QuickGO
Search
- PMC: articles
- PubMed: articles
- NCBI: proteins

In enzymology, L-aspartate oxidase (EC 1.4.3.16) is an enzyme that catalyzes the chemical reaction

aspartic acid
O_{2}
H_{2}O_{2}
O_{2}
H_{2}O_{2}
iminosuccinic acid

The two substrates of this enzyme are L-aspartic acid and oxygen. Its products are iminosuccinic acid and hydrogen peroxide. In Escherichia coli another enzyme, quinolinate synthase, takes the product with dihydroxyacetone phosphate to form quinolinic acid but simple hydrolysis gives oxaloacetic acid.

This enzyme belongs to the family of oxidoreductases, specifically those acting on the CH-NH_{2} group of donors with oxygen as acceptor. The systematic name of this enzyme class is L-aspartate:oxygen oxidoreductase (deaminating). This enzyme is part of the pathway for alanine metabolism and nicotinamide adenine dinucleotide biosynthesis. It employs one cofactor, flavin adenine dinucleotide.

== Structural studies ==
As of late 2007, 3 structures have been solved for this class of enzymes, with PDB accession codes PDB: 1J5P, PDB: 1KNP, and PDB: 1KNR.
