= 1-Methyltryptophan =

Names
- IUPAC name 1-Methyltryptophan
- Systematic IUPAC name 2-Amino-3-(1-methyl-1H-indol-3-yl)propanoic acid
- Other names 1-Methyl-DL-tryptophan; DL-1-Methyltryptophan; ARBRIN; Indoximod

Identifiers
CAS Number	26988-72-7 (D/L); 21339-55-9 (L)
3D model (JSmol)	Interactive image
ChEMBL	ChEMBL504816; ChEMBL514172
ChemSpider	88584
ECHA InfoCard	100.043.765
IUPHAR/BPS	4694
PubChem CID	98112
CompTox Dashboard (EPA)	DTXSID601314131
- InChI: InChI=1S/C12H14N2O2/c1-14-7-8(6-10(13)12(15)16)9-4-2-3-5-11(9)14/h2-5,7,10H,6,13H2,1H3,(H,15,16) Key: ZADWXFSZEAPBJS-UHFFFAOYSA-N; InChI=1S/C12H14N2O2/c1-14-7-8(6-10(13)12(15)16)9-4-2-3-5-11(9)14/h2-5,7,10H,6,13H2,1H3,(H,15,16) Key: ZADWXFSZEAPBJS-UHFFFAOYSA-N
- SMILES: O=C(O)C(N)Cc2c1ccccc1n(c2)C

Properties
Chemical formula	C_{12}H_{14}N_{2}O_{2}
Molar mass	218.256 g·mol^{−1}
- Except where otherwise noted, data are given for materials in their standard state (at 25 °C [77 °F], 100 kPa). verify (what is ?) Infobox references

1-Methyltryptophan is a chemical compound that is an inhibitor of the tryptophan catabolic enzyme indoleamine 2,3-dioxygenase (IDO or INDO EC 1.13.11.52). It is a chiral compound that can exist as both D- and L-enantiomers.

The L-isomer (L-1MT) inhibits IDO weakly but also serves as an enzyme substrate.

The D-isomer (D-1MT) does not inhibit IDO at all, but it can inhibit the IDO-related enzyme IDO2 and restore mTOR signaling in cells starved of tryptophan due to IDO activity. D-1MT is also known as indoximod and it was in clinical trials for cancer treatment, such as for advanced melanoma, in 2017.

A U.S. patent covering salt and prodrug formulations of indoximod was issued to NewLink Genetics on August 15, 2017, providing exclusivity until at least 2036.
