= Kynurenine—oxoglutarate transaminase =

Class of enzymes

Kynurenine-oxoglutarate transaminase
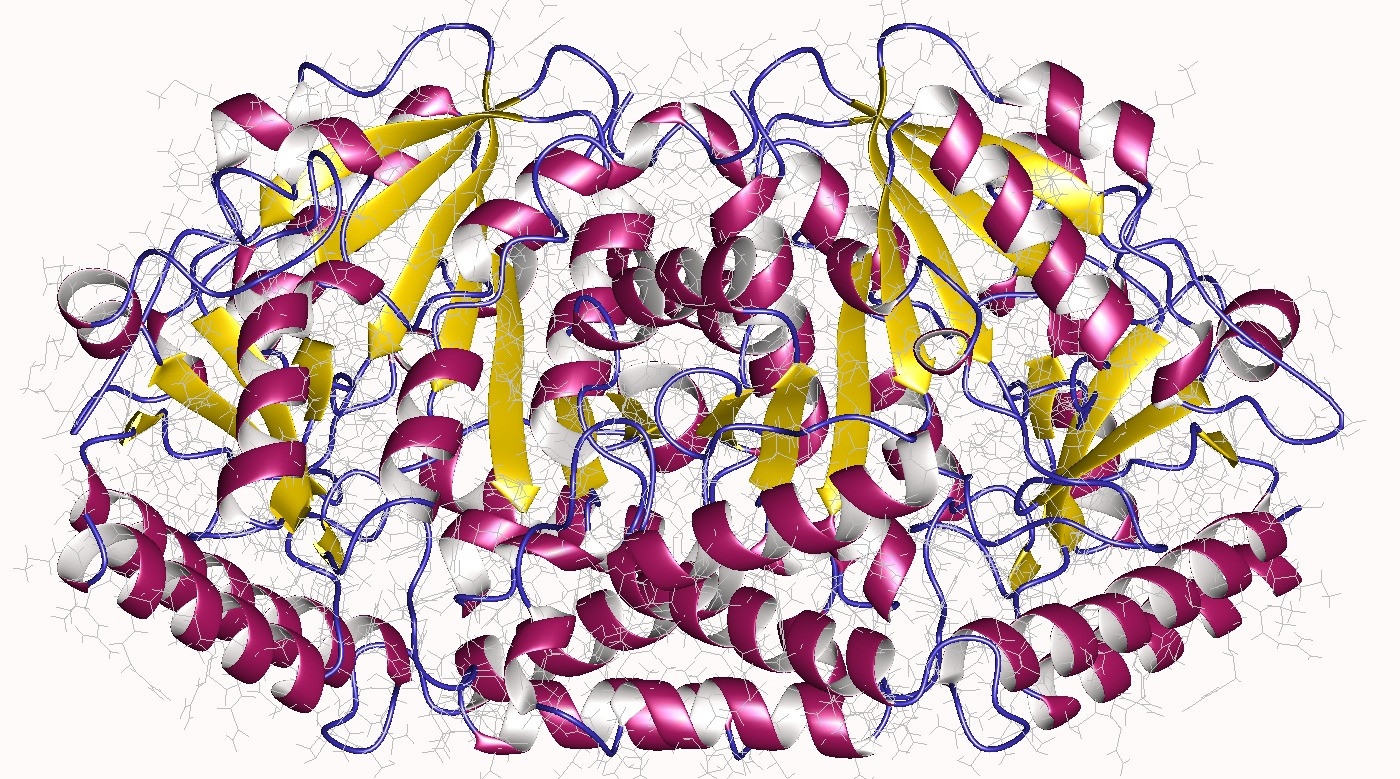
- Kynurenine aminotransferase-I homodimer, Human

Identifiers
- EC no.: 2.6.1.7
- CAS no.: 9030-38-0

Databases
- BRENDA: enzyme data
- ExPASy: NiceZyme view
- KEGG: enzyme entry
- MetaCyc: metabolic pathway
- Rhea: reactions
- PDB structures: RCSB PDB PDBe PDBsum
- Gene Ontology: AmiGO / QuickGO
Search
- PMC: articles
- PubMed: articles
- NCBI: proteins

Kynurenine-oxoglutarate transaminase (EC 2.6.1.7) is an enzyme that catalyzes the chemical reaction

Kynurenine
+
α-Ketoglutaric acid
H_{2}O
Kynurenic acid
+
L-Glutamic acid

The two substrates of this enzyme are kynurenine and α-ketoglutaric acid. Its initial products are 4-(2-aminophenyl)-2,4-dioxobutanoate and L-glutamic acid. The former product is an unstable α-oxo acid that spontaneously undergoes intramolecular cyclization to form kynurenic acid.

This enzyme belongs to the family of transferases, to be specific, the transaminases, that transfer nitrogenous groups. The systematic name of this enzyme class is L-kynurenine:2-oxoglutarate aminotransferase. Other names in common use include kynurenine transaminase (cyclizing), kynurenine 2-oxoglutarate transaminase, kynurenine aminotransferase, and L-kynurenine aminotransferase. This enzyme participates in tryptophan metabolism. It employs one cofactor, pyridoxal phosphate.

KYAT1, AADAT (aka KYAT2), and KYAT3 are examples of enzymes of this class. GOT2 (aka KYAT4) is also believed to catalyze the above reaction.

== Structural studies ==
As of early 2009, 18 structures have been solved for this class of enzymes, with PDB accession codes PDB: 1X0M, PDB: 1YIY, PDB: 1YIZ, PDB: 1W7L, PDB: 1W7M, PDB: 1W7N, PDB: 3E2F, PDB: 3E2Y, PDB: 3E2Z, PDB: 2ZJG, PDB: 2YGZ, PDB: 2Z61, PDB: 2R5C, PDB: 2R2N, PDB: 2R5E, PDB: 3B46, PDB: 3DC1, and PDB: 2QLN.
