= AADAT =

Mammalian protein found in humans

Identifiers
- Aliases: AADAT, KAT2, KATII, KYAT2, aminoadipate aminotransferase
- External IDs: OMIM: 611754; MGI: 1345167; GeneCards: AADAT
Available structures
PDB	Ortholog search: PDBe RCSB
PDB	List of PDB id codes 2QLR, 2R2N, 2VGZ, 2XH1, 3DC1, 3UE8, 4GDY, 4GE4, 4GE7, 4GE9, 4GEB, 5EUN, 5EFS
Enzyme activity
EC #	BRENDA	ExPASy	KEGG	MetaCyc
2.6.1.4	↗	↗	↗	↗
2.6.1.7	↗	↗	↗	↗
2.6.1.39	↗	↗	↗	↗
2.6.1.63	↗	↗	↗	↗
2.6.1.73	↗	↗	↗	↗

Gene location (Human)
Chr.	Chromosome 4 (human)
Band	4q33	Start	170,060,222 bp
Band	4q33	End	170,091,699 bp

Gene location (Mouse)
Chr.	Chromosome 8 (mouse)
Band	8 B3.1|8 30.85 cM	Start	60,958,966 bp
Band	8 B3.1|8 30.85 cM	End	60,998,711 bp
RNA expression pattern
Bgee	Human / Mouse (ortholog); Top expressed in: right lobe of liver; gonad; testicle; body of uterus; canal of the cervix; ganglionic eminence; ventricular zone; right coronary artery; endometrium; smooth muscle tissue / Top expressed in: right kidney; proximal tubule; human kidney; left lobe of liver; yolk sac; renal pelvis; otic vesicle; embryo; renal calyx; proximal straight tubule; More reference expression data
BioGPS	n/a
Gene ontology
Molecular function	transferase activity; pyridoxal phosphate binding; kynurenine-oxoglutarate transaminase activity; 2-aminoadipate transaminase activity; catalytic activity; protein homodimerization activity; transaminase activity
Cellular component	mitochondrial matrix; mitochondrion
Biological process	L-lysine catabolic process to acetyl-CoA via saccharopine; tryptophan catabolic process; glutamate metabolic process; biosynthetic process; 2-oxoglutarate metabolic process; lysine catabolic process; kynurenine metabolic process; L-kynurenine metabolic process; alpha-amino acid metabolic process
Sources:Amigo / QuickGO
Orthologs
Databases	NCBI: entry; OMA: entry
Species	Human	Mouse
Entrez	51166	23923
Ensembl	ENSG00000109576	ENSMUSG00000057228
UniProt	Q8N5Z0	Q9WVM8
RefSeq (mRNA)	NM_001286682; NM_001286683; NM_016228; NM_182662	NM_011834
RefSeq (protein)	NP_001273611; NP_001273612; NP_057312; NP_872603	NP_035964
Location (UCSC)	Chr 4: 170.06 – 170.09 Mb	Chr 8: 60.96 – 61 Mb
PubMed search
- Wikidata
View/Edit Human	View/Edit Mouse

Kynurenine/alpha-aminoadipate aminotransferase, mitochondrial, also known as alpha-aminoadipate aminotransferase and kynurenine aminotransferase 2, is a mitochondrial enzyme that in humans is encoded by the AADAT gene. It converts alpha-aminoadipate to alpha-ketoadipate. It is also one of the kynurenine—oxoglutarate transaminases.
