= KYAT3 =

Protein-coding gene in humans

Identifiers
- Aliases: KYAT3, KAT3, KATIII, CCBL2, kynurenine aminotransferase 3
- External IDs: OMIM: 610656; MGI: 2677849; GeneCards: KYAT3
Available structures
PDB	Ortholog search: PDBe RCSB
PDB	List of PDB id codes 2ZJG, 3E2F, 3E2Y, 3E2Z
Enzyme activity
EC #	BRENDA	ExPASy	KEGG	MetaCyc
2.6.1.7	↗	↗	↗	↗
2.6.1.63	↗	↗	↗	↗
4.4.1.13	↗	↗	↗	↗

Gene location (Mouse)
Chr.	Chromosome 3 (mouse)
Band	3|3 H1	Start	142,406,812 bp
Band	3|3 H1	End	142,452,631 bp
Gene ontology
Molecular function	cysteine-S-conjugate beta-lyase activity; transaminase activity; kynurenine-oxoglutarate transaminase activity; catalytic activity; lyase activity; pyridoxal phosphate binding; protein homodimerization activity; kynurenine-glyoxylate transaminase activity; transferase activity; RNA binding; kynurenine aminotransferase activity
Cellular component	mitochondrion; cytoplasm
Biological process	L-kynurenine metabolic process; biosynthetic process; kynurenine metabolic process; cellular amino acid metabolic process; 2-oxoglutarate metabolic process
Sources:Amigo / QuickGO
Orthologs
Databases	NCBI: entry; OMA: entry
Species	Human	Mouse
Entrez	56267	229905
Ensembl	ENSG00000137944	ENSMUSG00000040213
UniProt	Q6YP21	Q71RI9
RefSeq (mRNA)	NM_001008662; NM_001008661	NM_001293560; NM_173763
RefSeq (protein)	NP_001008661; NP_001008662; NP_001336376; NP_001336377; NP_001336378 NP_001336379	NP_001280489; NP_776124
Location (UCSC)	n/a	Chr 3: 142.41 – 142.45 Mb
PubMed search
- Wikidata
View/Edit Human	View/Edit Mouse

Kynurenine aminotransferase 3 is an enzyme that in humans is encoded by the KYAT3 gene. It is one of the kynurenine—oxoglutarate transaminases.
