= Linrodostat =

Chemical compound

Clinical data
- Other names: BMS-986205; ONO 7701
- Routes of administration: Oral

Legal status
- Legal status: Investigational

Identifiers
- IUPAC name: (2R)-N-(4-Chlorophenyl)-2-[(1s,4S)-4-(6-fluoroquinolin-4-yl)cyclohexyl]propanamide
- CAS Number: 1923833-60-6
- DrugBank: DB14986
- ChemSpider: 58828674
- UNII: 0A7729F42K

Chemical and physical data
- Formula: C_{24}H_{24}ClFN_{2}O
- Molar mass: 410.92 g·mol^{−1}
- 3D model (JSmol): Interactive image
- SMILES: FC1=CC=2C(=CC=NC2C=C1)[C@@H]3CC[C@]([C@H](C(NC4=CC=C(Cl)C=C4)=O)C)(CC3)[H]
- InChI: InChI=1S/C24H24ClFN2O/c1-15(24(29)28-20-9-6-18(25)7-10-20)16-2-4-17(5-3-16)21-12-13-27-23-11-8-19(26)14-22(21)23/h6-17H,2-5H2,1H3,(H,28,29)/t15-,16-,17+/m1/s1; Key:KRTIYQIPSAGSBP-ZACQAIPSSA-N

Linrodostat (development code BMS-986205) is an experimental drug being studied for its immunomodulating and antineoplastic activities.

Linrodostat is an inhibitor of indoleamine 2,3-dioxygenase 1 (IDO1).

Linrodostat has entered clinical trials for a variety of cancer types including bladder cancer, head and neck cancer, endometrial cancer, gastric cancer, melanoma, liver cancer, non-small cell lung cancer, and solid tumors.
