= Iminosuccinic acid =

Names
- IUPAC name 2-Iminobutanedioic acid
- Other names Iminoaspartic acid; 2-iminobutanedioic acid, iminosuccinate, alpha-iminosuccinate, iminosuccinic acid

Identifiers
CAS Number	79067-61-1
3D model (JSmol)	Interactive image
ChEBI	CHEBI:50616
ChemSpider	13628208
KEGG	C05840
PubChem CID	796
UNII	QHW8YF5XND
CompTox Dashboard (EPA)	DTXSID30868498
- InChI: InChI=1S/C4H5NO4/c5-2(4(8)9)1-3(6)7/h5H,1H2,(H,6,7)(H,8,9) Key: NMUOATVLLQEYHI-UHFFFAOYSA-N; InChI=1/C4H5NO4/c5-2(4(8)9)1-3(6)7/h5H,1H2,(H,6,7)(H,8,9) Key: NMUOATVLLQEYHI-UHFFFAOYAF
- SMILES: C(C(=N)C(=O)O)C(=O)O

Properties
Chemical formula	C_{4}H_{5}NO_{4}
Molar mass	131.087 g·mol^{−1}
- Except where otherwise noted, data are given for materials in their standard state (at 25 °C [77 °F], 100 kPa). Infobox references

Iminoaspartic acid (also known as iminosuccinate or iminoaspartate) is a dicarboxylic acid used in the biosynthesis of nicotinic acid and nicotinamide adenine dinucleotide.

== Biosynthesis ==
The enzyme L-aspartate oxidase oxidises L-aspartic acid:

aspartic acid
O_{2}
H_{2}O_{2}
O_{2}
H_{2}O_{2}
iminosuccinic acid

=== Subsequent conversions ===
In Escherichia coli another enzyme, quinolinate synthase, takes iminosuccinic acid with dihydroxyacetone phosphate to form quinolinic acid.

dihydroxyacetone phosphate
+
iminosuccinic acid
2 H_{2}O
2 H_{2}O
quinolinic acid
+ H_{3}PO_{4}

This iron-sulfur protein requires a [4Fe-4S] cluster for activity. The quinolinic acid can be converted to nicotinic acid or incorporated into nicotinamide adenine dinucleotide.
