= KYAT1 =

Protein-coding gene in the species Homo sapiens

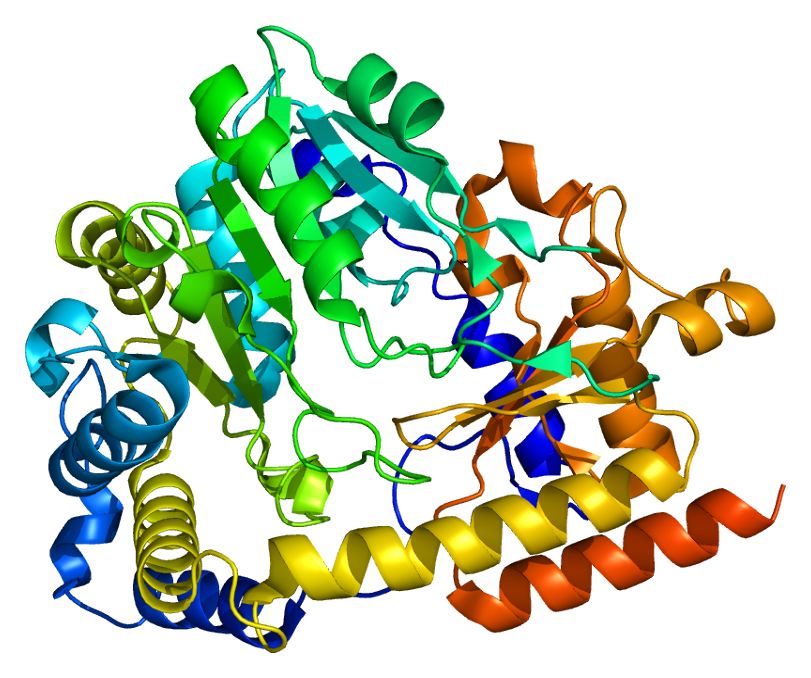

Identifiers
- Aliases: KYAT1, GTK, KAT1, KATI, CCBL1, kynurenine aminotransferase 1
- External IDs: OMIM: 600547; MGI: 1917516; GeneCards: KYAT1
Available structures
PDB	Ortholog search: PDBe RCSB
PDB	List of PDB id codes 1W7L, 1W7M, 1W7N, 3FVS, 3FVU, 3FVX, 4WLH, 4WLJ, 4WP0
Enzyme activity
EC #	BRENDA	ExPASy	KEGG	MetaCyc
2.6.1.7	↗	↗	↗	↗
2.6.1.64	↗	↗	↗	↗
4.4.1.13	↗	↗	↗	↗

Gene location (Mouse)
Chr.	Chromosome 2 (mouse)
Band	2|2 B	Start	30,075,136 bp
Band	2|2 B	End	30,095,859 bp
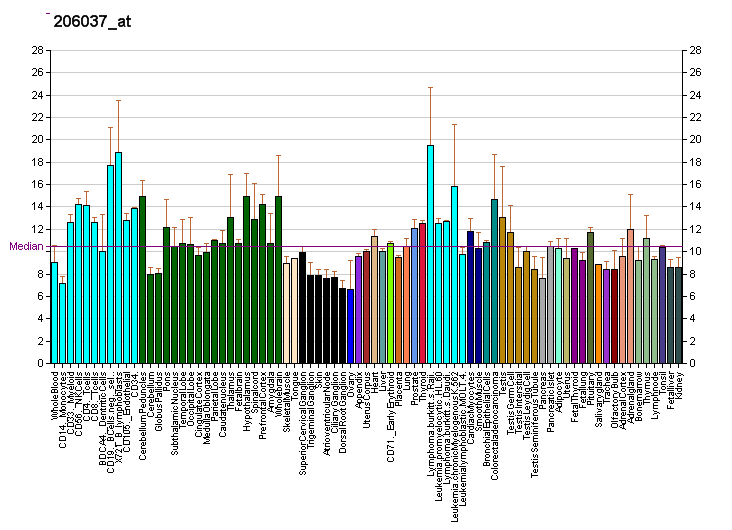
RNA expression pattern
Bgee	Human / Mouse (ortholog); n/a / Top expressed in: esophagus; right kidney; lip; left lobe of liver; human kidney; middle ear; Eustachian tube; salivary gland; seminal vesicula; parotid gland
BioGPS	More reference expression data
Gene ontology
Molecular function	transferase activity; kynurenine-oxoglutarate transaminase activity; protein homodimerization activity; L-glutamine:pyruvate aminotransferase activity; transaminase activity; glutamine-phenylpyruvate transaminase activity; protein binding; catalytic activity; lyase activity; L-phenylalanine:pyruvate aminotransferase activity; pyridoxal phosphate binding; L-glutamine aminotransferase activity; cysteine-S-conjugate beta-lyase activity
Cellular component	nucleoplasm; cytoplasm; cytosol; mitochondrion
Biological process	L-phenylalanine catabolic process; cellular amino acid biosynthetic process; biosynthetic process; L-kynurenine catabolic process; tryptophan catabolic process; cellular modified amino acid metabolic process; kynurenine metabolic process
Sources:Amigo / QuickGO
Orthologs
Databases	NCBI: entry; OMA: entry
Species	Human	Mouse
Entrez	883	70266
Ensembl	ENSG00000171097	ENSMUSG00000039648
UniProt	Q16773	Q8BTY1
RefSeq (mRNA)	NM_001122671; NM_001122672; NM_001287390; NM_004059	NM_172404; NM_001356474; NM_001356475
RefSeq (protein)	NP_001116143; NP_001116144; NP_001274319; NP_004050; NP_001339917 NP_001339918; NP_001339919; NP_001339920; NP_001339921; NP_001339922; NP_001339923; NP_001339924; NP_001339925; NP_001339926; NP_001339927; NP_001339928	NP_765992; NP_001343403; NP_001343404
Location (UCSC)	n/a	Chr 2: 30.08 – 30.1 Mb
PubMed search
- Wikidata
View/Edit Human	View/Edit Mouse

Kynurenine—oxoglutarate transaminase 1 is an enzyme that in humans is encoded by the CCBL1 gene. It is one of the Kynurenine—oxoglutarate transaminases.

This gene encodes a cytosolic enzyme which is responsible for the metabolism of cysteine conjugates of certain halogenated alkenes and alkanes. This metabolism leads to the formation of reactive metabolites which can lead to nephrotoxicity and neurotoxicity.
