= Phosphonoacetaldehyde hydrolase =

Class of enzymes

Identifiers
- EC no.: 3.11.1.1
- CAS no.: 37289-42-2

Databases
- BRENDA: enzyme data
- ExPASy: NiceZyme view
- KEGG: enzyme entry
- MetaCyc: metabolic pathway
- Rhea: reactions
- PDB structures: RCSB PDB PDBe PDBsum
- Gene Ontology: AmiGO / QuickGO
Search
- PMC: articles
- PubMed: articles
- NCBI: proteins

Phosphonoacetaldehyde hydrolase (EC 3.11.1.1) is an enzyme characterised from Bacillus cereus that catalyzes the hydrolysis of phosphonoacetaldehyde to acetaldehyde and orthophosphate (P_{i}):

phosphonoacetaldehyde
H_{2}O
P_{i}
acetaldehyde

The mechanism of the reaction involves Schiff base formation between a lysine residue of the enzyme and the aldehyde group. The phosphorus group is then transferred to an aspartic acid. The reaction is part of a pathway which allows plants to use 2-aminoethylphosphonic acid, an abundant source of phosphorus in soils, which is transformed by 2-aminoethylphosphonate—pyruvate transaminase into phosphonoacetaldehyde.

This enzyme is a hydrolase, specifically one acting on carbon-phosphorus bonds. The systematic name of this enzyme class is 2-oxoethylphosphonate phosphonohydrolase. Other names in common use include phosphonatase, and 2-phosphonoacetylaldehyde phosphonohydrolase.

== Structural studies ==
As of late 2007, two structures have been solved for this class of enzymes, with PDB accession codes PDB: 1SWV and PDB: 1SWW.
