= 6-Hydroxykynurenic acid =

Names
- Preferred IUPAC name 4,6-Dihydroxyquinoline-2-carboxylic acid

Identifiers
CAS Number	3778-29-8
3D model (JSmol)	Interactive image
ChEBI	CHEBI:2195
ChemSpider	389622
KEGG	C08480
PubChem CID	440752
UNII	22HF379Q3C
CompTox Dashboard (EPA)	DTXSID80331521
- InChI: InChI=1S/C10H7NO4/c12-5-1-2-7-6(3-5)9(13)4-8(11-7)10(14)15/h1-4,12H,(H,11,13)(H,14,15) Key: CQUUHDQRJWXDPY-UHFFFAOYSA-N; InChI=1/C10H7NO4/c12-5-1-2-7-6(3-5)9(13)4-8(11-7)10(14)15/h1-4,12H,(H,11,13)(H,14,15) Key: CQUUHDQRJWXDPY-UHFFFAOYAS
- SMILES: C1=CC2=C(C=C1O)C(=CC(=N2)C(=O)O)O

Properties
Chemical formula	C_{10}H_{7}NO_{4}
Molar mass	205.169 g·mol^{−1}
- Except where otherwise noted, data are given for materials in their standard state (at 25 °C [77 °F], 100 kPa). Infobox references

6-Hydroxykynurenic acid is a constituent of ginkgo and an amino acid. It is a derivative of kynurenic acid and has similarly been found to antagonize AMPA and NMDA, as well as their corresponding receptors.

== See also ==
- Kynurenic acid
