= 2-aminoethylphosphonate—pyruvate transaminase =

InterPro Family

2-aminoethylphosphonate-pyruvate transaminase

Identifiers
- EC no.: 2.6.1.37
- CAS no.: 37277-91-1

Databases
- BRENDA: enzyme data
- ExPASy: NiceZyme view
- KEGG: enzyme entry
- MetaCyc: metabolic pathway
- Rhea: reactions
- PDB structures: RCSB PDB PDBe PDBsum
- Gene Ontology: AmiGO / QuickGO
Search
- PMC: articles
- PubMed: articles
- NCBI: proteins

2-aminoethylphosphonate—pyruvate transaminase (EC 2.6.1.37) is an enzyme originally characterised from Bacillus cereus that catalyzes a reversible chemical reaction that interconverts 2-aminoethylphosphonic acid and pyruvic acid with phosphonoacetaldehyde and L-alanine. It has also been found in Pseudomonas aeruginosa. In that case, 2-aminoethylarsonate can replace 2-aminoethylphosphonic acid.

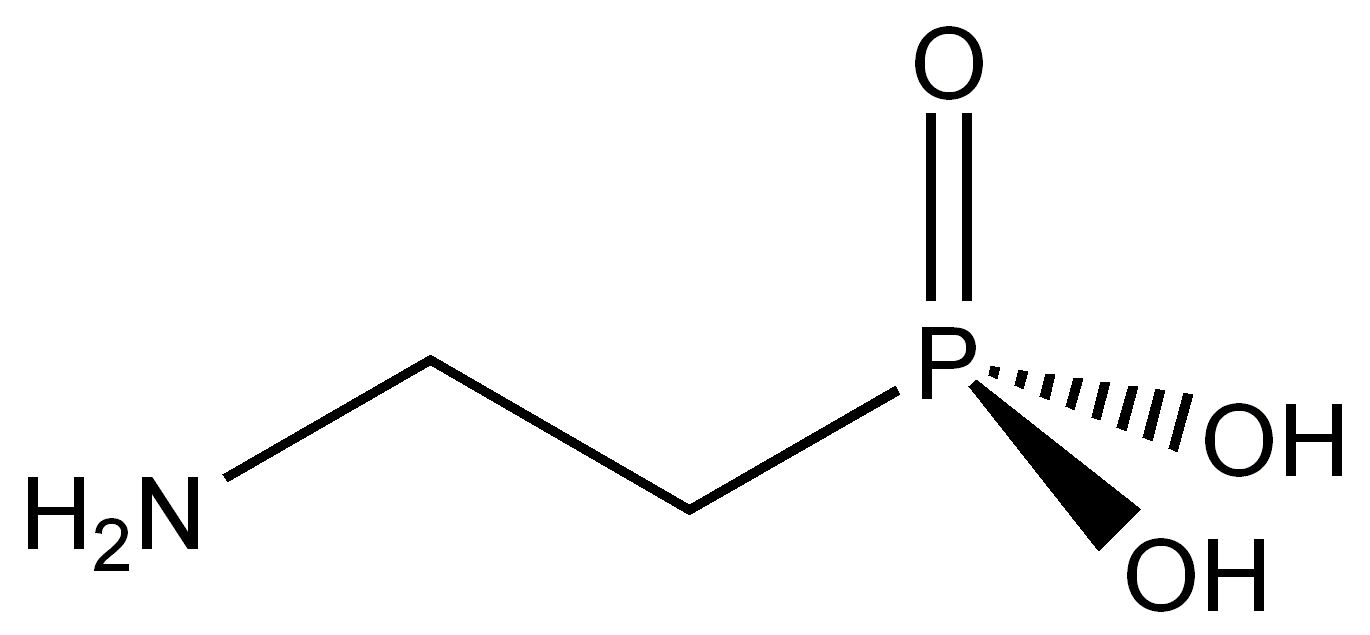
2-aminoethylphosphonic acid
+
pyruvic acid
phosphonoacetaldehyde
+
alanine

The reaction is part of a pathway that allows plants to use 2-aminoethylphosphonic acid from soil as a source of phosphate, after the product phosphonoacetaldehyde is acted on by the enzyme phosphonoacetaldehyde hydrolase.

The enzyme is a transferase, specifically a transaminase, which transfer nitrogenous groups. The systematic name of this enzyme class is (2-aminoethyl)phosphonate:pyruvate aminotransferase. Other names in common use include (2-aminoethyl)phosphonate transaminase, (2-aminoethyl)phosphonate aminotransferase, (2-aminoethyl)phosphonic acid aminotransferase, 2-aminoethylphosphonate-pyruvate aminotransferase, 2-aminoethylphosphonate aminotransferase, 2-aminoethylphosphonate transaminase, AEP transaminase, and AEPT. It uses pyridoxal phosphate and the stereochemistry of the interaction between 2-aminoethylphosphonic acid and that cofactor has been determined.

== Structural studies ==
As of late 2007, only one structure has been solved for this class of enzymes, with the PDB accession code PDB: 1M32.
