= Indoleamine 2,3-dioxygenase =

Mammalian protein found in Homo sapiens

IDO1
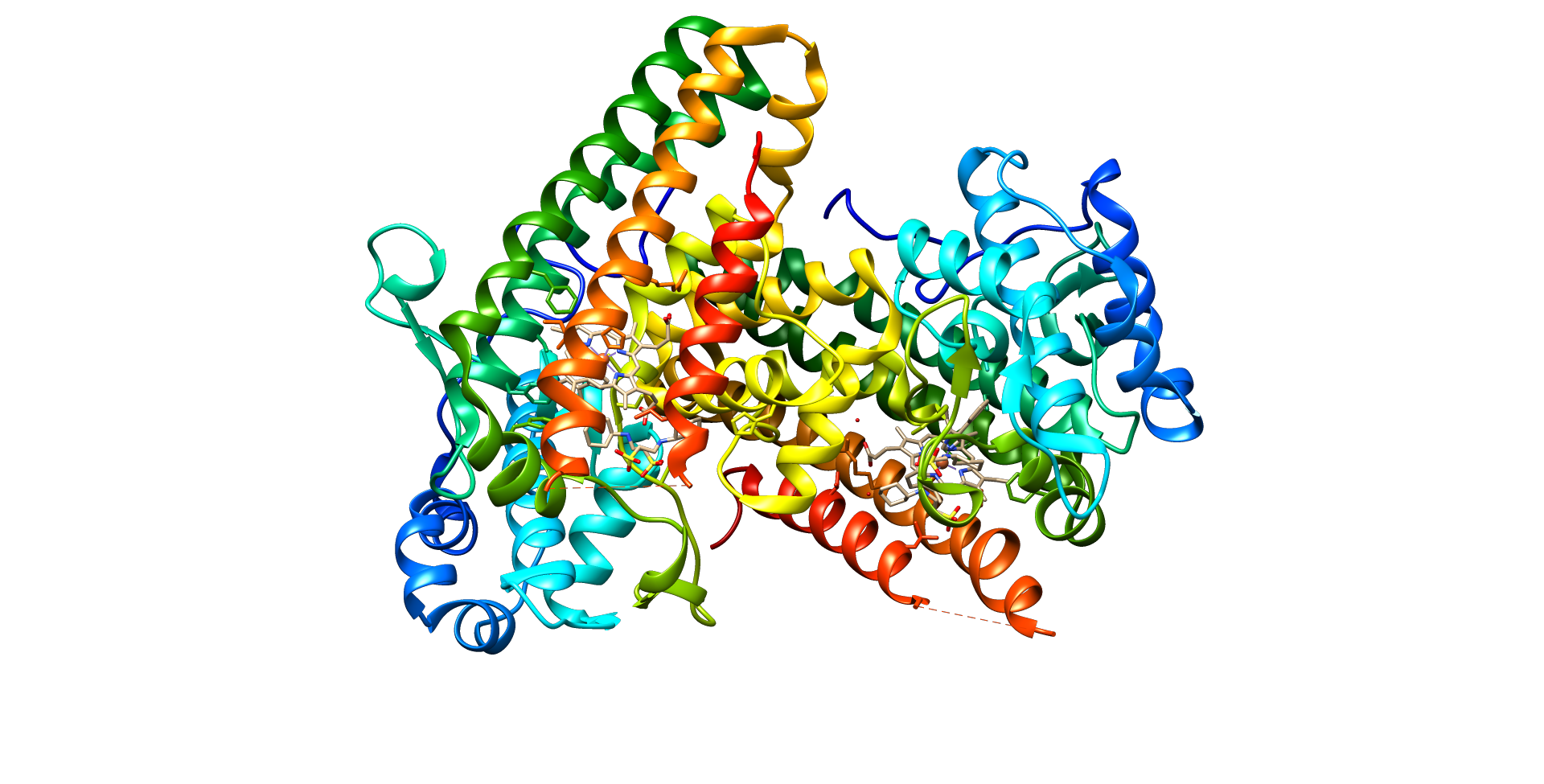

Identifiers
- Aliases: IDO1, IDO, IDO-1, INDO, indoleamine 2,3-dioxygenase 1
- External IDs: OMIM: 147435; MGI: 96416; GeneCards: IDO1
Available structures
PDB	Ortholog search: PDBe RCSB
PDB	List of PDB id codes 2D0T, 2D0U, 4PK5, 4PK6, 4U72, 4U74, 5EK2, 5EK3, 5EK4, 5ETW
Enzyme activity
EC #	BRENDA	ExPASy	KEGG	MetaCyc
1.13.11.52	↗	↗	↗	↗

Gene location (Human)
Chr.	Chromosome 8 (human)
Band	8p11.21	Start	39,902,275 bp
Band	8p11.21	End	39,928,790 bp

Gene location (Mouse)
Chr.	Chromosome 8 (mouse)
Band	8|8 A2	Start	25,074,152 bp
Band	8|8 A2	End	25,087,025 bp
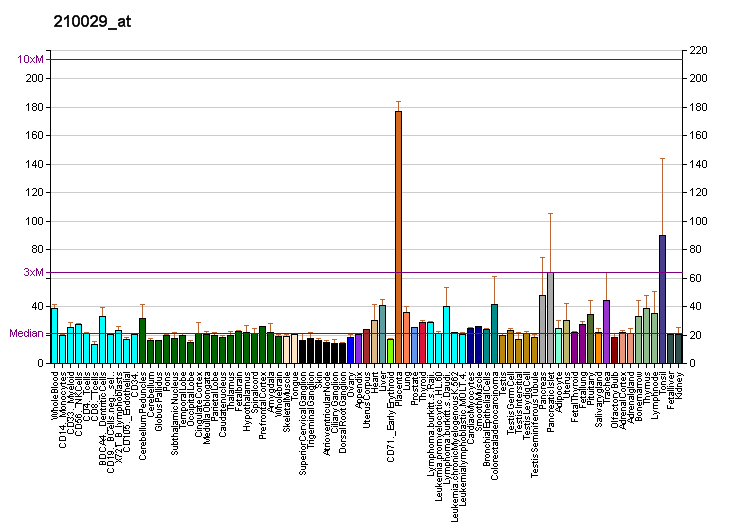
RNA expression pattern
Bgee	Human / Mouse (ortholog); Top expressed in: palpebral conjunctiva; epithelium of nasopharynx; appendix; nasal epithelium; placenta; lymph node; endometrium; gonad; upper lobe of left lung; rectum / Top expressed in: dorsal striatum; mucous cell of stomach; jejunum; duodenum; intestinal villus; nucleus accumbens; Paneth cell; globus pallidus; submandibular gland; plantaris muscle; More reference expression data
BioGPS	More reference expression data
Gene ontology
Molecular function	dioxygenase activity; metal ion binding; heme binding; electron transfer activity; oxidoreductase activity; indoleamine 2,3-dioxygenase activity; tryptophan 2,3-dioxygenase activity
Cellular component	cytoplasm; stereocilium bundle; cytosol; smooth muscle contractile fiber
Biological process	negative regulation of interleukin-10 production; multicellular organismal response to stress; positive regulation of interleukin-12 production; immune system process; female pregnancy; positive regulation of T cell tolerance induction; cytokine production involved in inflammatory response; positive regulation of chronic inflammatory response; negative regulation of T cell apoptotic process; regulation of activated T cell proliferation; response to lipopolysaccharide; negative regulation of T cell proliferation; positive regulation of apoptotic process; tryptophan catabolic process; positive regulation of type 2 immune response; inflammatory response; kynurenic acid biosynthetic process; positive regulation of T cell apoptotic process; swimming behavior; tryptophan catabolic process to kynurenine; electron transport chain; 'de novo' NAD biosynthetic process from tryptophan
Sources:Amigo / QuickGO
Orthologs
Databases	NCBI: entry; OMA: entry
Species	Human	Mouse
Entrez	3620	15930
Ensembl	ENSG00000131203	ENSMUSG00000031551
UniProt	P14902	P28776
RefSeq (mRNA)	NM_002164	NM_008324; NM_001293690
RefSeq (protein)	NP_002155	NP_001280619; NP_032350
Location (UCSC)	Chr 8: 39.9 – 39.93 Mb	Chr 8: 25.07 – 25.09 Mb
PubMed search
- Wikidata
View/Edit Human	View/Edit Mouse

Indoleamine 2,3-dioxygenase
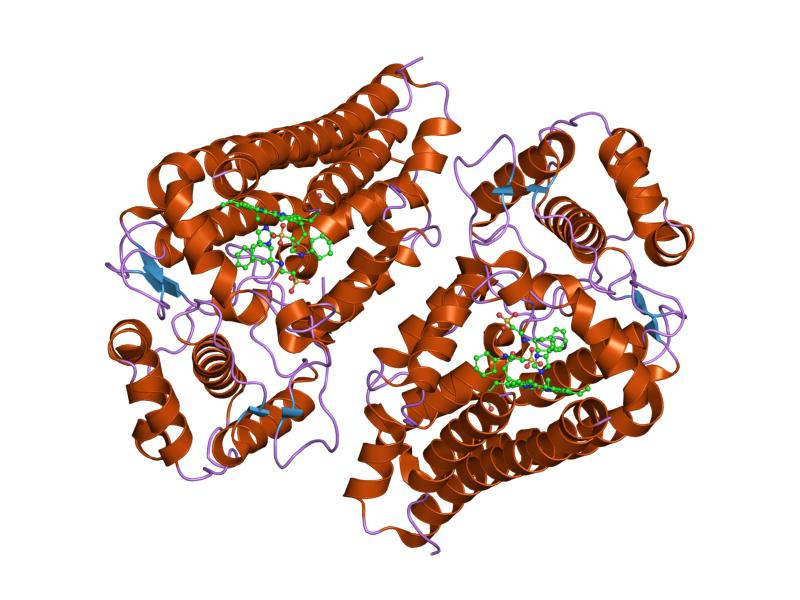
- crystal structure of 4-phenylimidazole bound form of human indoleamine 2,3-dioxygenase

Identifiers
- Symbol: IDO
- Pfam: PF01231
- Pfam clan: CL0380
- InterPro: IPR000898
- PROSITE: PDOC00684
Available protein structures:
- PDB: IPR000898 PF01231 (ECOD; PDBsum)
- AlphaFold: IPR000898; PF01231

Indoleamine 2,3-dioxygenase

Identifiers
- EC no.: 1.13.11.52
- CAS no.: 9014-51-1

Databases
- BRENDA: enzyme data
- ExPASy: NiceZyme view
- KEGG: enzyme entry
- MetaCyc: metabolic pathway
- Rhea: reactions
- PDB structures: RCSB PDB PDBe PDBsum
- Gene Ontology: AmiGO / QuickGO
Search
- PMC: articles
- PubMed: articles
- NCBI: proteins

Indoleamine-pyrrole 2,3-dioxygenase (IDO or INDO EC 1.13.11.52) is a heme-containing enzyme physiologically expressed in a number of tissues and cells, such as the small intestine, lungs, female genital tract or placenta. In humans is encoded by the IDO1 gene. IDO is involved in tryptophan metabolism. It is one of three enzymes that catalyze the first and rate-limiting step in the kynurenine pathway, the O_{2}-dependent oxidation of L-tryptophan to N-formylkynurenine, the others being indolamine-2,3-dioxygenase 2 (IDO2) and tryptophan 2,3-dioxygenase (TDO). IDO is an important part of the immune system and plays a part in natural defense against various pathogens. It is produced by the cells in response to inflammation and has an immunosuppressive function because of its ability to limit T-cell function and engage mechanisms of immune tolerance. Emerging evidence suggests that IDO becomes activated during tumor development, helping malignant cells escape eradication by the immune system. Expression of IDO has been described in a number of types of cancer, such as acute myeloid leukemia, ovarian cancer or colorectal cancer. IDO is part of the malignant transformation process and plays a key role in suppressing the anti-tumor immune response in the body, so inhibiting it could increase the effect of chemotherapy as well as other immunotherapeutic protocols. Furthermore, there is data implicating a role for IDO1 in the modulation of vascular tone in conditions of inflammation via a novel pathway involving singlet oxygen.

== Physiological function ==
Indoleamine 2,3-dioxygenase is the first and rate-limiting enzyme of tryptophan catabolism through the kynurenine pathway. The reaction catalysed is:

Tryptophan
O_{2}
N'-Formylkynurenine

IDO is an important molecule in the mechanisms of tolerance and its physiological functions include the suppression of potentially dangerous inflammatory processes in the body. IDO also plays a role in natural defense against microorganisms. Expression of IDO is induced by interferon-gamma, which explains why the expression increases during inflammatory diseases or even during tumorigenesis. Since tryptophan is essential for the survival of pathogens, the activity of enzyme IDO destroys them. Microorganisms susceptible to tryptophan deficiency include bacteria of genus Streptococcus or viruses such as herpes simplex or measles.

One of the organs with high IDO expression is the placenta. In the 1990s, the immunosuppressive function of this enzyme was first described in mice due to the study of placental tryptophan metabolism. Thus, mammalian placenta, due to intensive tryptophan catabolism has the ability to suppress T cell activity, thereby contributing to its position of immunologically privileged tissue.

== Clinical significance ==
IDO is an immune checkpoint molecule in the sense that it is an immunomodulatory enzyme produced by alternatively activated macrophages and other immunoregulatory cells. IDO is known to suppress T and NK cells, generate Tregs and myeloid-derived suppressor cells, and also supports angiogenesis.

These mechanisms are crucial in the process of carcinogenesis. IDO allows tumor cells to escape the immune system by two main mechanisms. The first mechanism is based on tryptophan depletion from the tumor microenvironment. The second mechanism is based on the production of catabolic products called kynurenins, that are cytotoxic for T lymphocytes and NK cells. Overexpression of human IDO (hIDO) is described in a variety of human tumor cell lineages and is often associated with poor prognosis. Tumors with increased production of IDO include prostate, ovarian, lung or pancreatic cancer or acute myeloid leukemia. Expression of IDO is under physiological conditions regulated by the Bin1 gene, which can be damaged by tumor transformation.

Emerging clinical studies suggest that combination of IDO inhibitors with classical chemotherapy and radiotherapy could restore immune control and provide a therapeutic response to generally resistant tumors. Enzyme IDO used by tumors to escape immune surveillance is currently in focus of research and drug discovery efforts, as well as efforts to understand if it could be used as a biomarker for prognosis.

=== Inhibitors ===
COX-2 inhibitors down-regulate indoleamine 2,3-dioxygenase, leading to a reduction in kynurenine levels as well as reducing proinflammatory cytokine activity.

1-Methyltryptophan is a racemic compound that weakly inhibits indoleamine dioxygenase, but is also a very slow substrate. The specific racemer 1-methyl-D-tryptophan (known as indoximod) is in clinical trials for various cancers.

Epacadostat (INCB24360), navoximod (GDC-0919), and linrodostat (BMS-986205) are potent inhibitors of the indoleamine 2,3-dioxygenase enzyme and are in clinical trials for various cancers.

== See also ==
- 1-Methyltryptophan
- Tryptophan 2,3-dioxygenase
