= Quinolinate synthase =

Class of enzymes

Identifiers
- EC no.: 2.5.1.72

Databases
- IntEnz: IntEnz view
- BRENDA: BRENDA entry
- ExPASy: NiceZyme view
- KEGG: KEGG entry
- MetaCyc: metabolic pathway
- PRIAM: profile
- PDB structures: RCSB PDB PDBe PDBsum
Search
- PMC: articles
- PubMed: articles
- NCBI: proteins

Quinolinate synthase (EC 2.5.1.72, NadA, QS, quinolinate synthetase) is an enzyme with systematic name glycerone phosphate:iminosuccinate alkyltransferase (cyclizing). This enzyme catalyses the following chemical reaction

dihydroxyacetone phosphate
+
iminosuccinic acid
2 H_{2}O
2 H_{2}O
quinolinic acid
+ H_{3}PO_{4}

This iron-sulfur protein requires a [4Fe-4S] cluster for activity. The quinolinic acid is later incorporated into nicotinamide adenine dinucleotide.
