= Kynurenine pathway =

Metabolic pathway that produces the NAD coenzyme

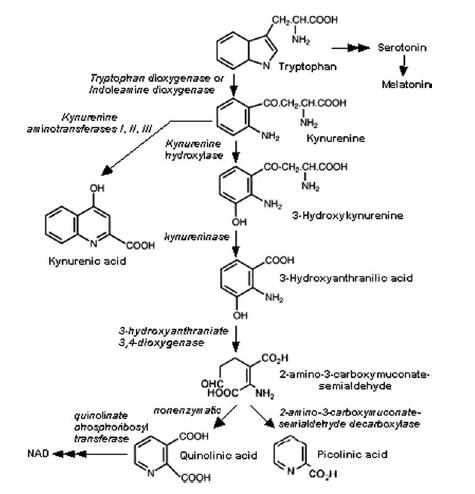
The kynurenine pathway

The kynurenine pathway is a metabolic pathway leading to the production of nicotinamide adenine dinucleotide (NAD^{+}). Metabolites involved in the kynurenine pathway include tryptophan, kynurenine, kynurenic acid, xanthurenic acid, quinolinic acid, and 3-hydroxykynurenine. The kynurenine pathway is responsible for about 95% of total tryptophan catabolism. Disruption in the pathway is associated with certain genetic and psychiatric disorders.

== Kynurenine pathway dysfunction ==
Disorders affecting the kynurenine pathway may be primary (of genetic origin) or secondary (due to inflammatory conditions). Peripheral inflammation can lead to a build up of kynurenine in the brain, and this is associated with major depressive disorder, bipolar disorder, and schizophrenia. Dysfunction of the pathway not only causes increase in amounts of metabolites such as quinolinic acid and kynurenic acid but also affects synthesis of serotonin and melatonin. Kynurenine clearance in exercised muscle cells can suppress the build up in the brain.

=== Hydroxykynureninuria ===
Also known as kynureninase deficiency, this extremely rare inherited disorder is caused by the defective enzyme kynureninase which leads to a block in the pathway from tryptophan to nicotinic acid mononucleotide (NaMN). As a result, tryptophan is no longer a source of niacin, hence not producing NAD, leading to pellagra (niacin deficiency). Both B_{6}-responsive and B_{6}-unresponsive forms are known. Patients with this disorder excrete excessive amounts of xanthurenic acid, kynurenic acid, 3-hydroxykynurenine, and kynurenine after tryptophan loading and are said to suffer from tachycardia, irregular breathing, arterial hypotension, cerebellar ataxia, developmental retardation, coma, renal tubular dysfunction, renal or metabolic acidosis, and even death. The only biochemical abnormality noted in affected patients was a massive hyperkynureninuria, seen only during periods of coma or after intravenous protein loading. This disturbance was temporarily corrected by large doses of vitamin B_{6}. The activity of kynureninase in the liver was markedly reduced. The activity was appreciably restored by the addition of pyridoxal phosphate.

=== Acquired and inherited enzyme deficiencies ===
Downregulation of kynurenine 3-monooxygenase (KMO) can be caused by genetic polymorphisms, cytokines, or both. KMO deficiency leads to an accumulation of kynurenine and to a shift within the tryptophan metabolic pathway towards kynurenic acid and anthranilic acid.

Deficiencies of one or more enzymes on the kynurenine pathway leads to an accumulation of intermediate metabolic products which can cause effects depending on their concentration, function and their inter-relation with other metabolic products. For example, kynurenine 3-monooxygenase deficiency is associated with disorders of the brain (such as schizophrenia and tic disorders) and of the liver. The mechanism behind this observation is typically a blockade or bottleneck situation at one or more enzymes on the kynurenine pathway due to the effects of indoleamine 2,3-dioxygenase (IDO) and tryptophan 2,3-dioxygenase (TDO) and/or due to genetic polymorphisms afflicting the particular genes. Dysfunctional states of distinct steps of the kynurenine pathway (such as kynurenine, kynurenic acid, quinolinic acid, anthranilic acid, 3-hydroxykynurenine) have been described for a number of disorders, for example:

- HIV dementia
- Tourette syndrome
- Tic disorders
- Attention deficit hyperactivity disorder (ADHD)
- Psychiatric disorders (such as schizophrenia, major depressive disorder, bipolar disorder, anxiety disorders)
- Multiple sclerosis
- Huntington's disease
- Encephalopathies
- Lipid metabolism
- Liver fat metabolism
- Systemic lupus erythematosus
- Glutaric aciduria
- Vitamin B_{6} deficiency
- Eosinophilia-myalgia syndrome
- Long COVID

== Research ==
Research into roles of the kynurenine pathway in human physiology is ongoing.

=== Neurodegenerative diseases and mental disorders ===
Scientists are investigating the role of dysregulation of this pathway in aging, neurodegenerative diseases, mental disorders, somatic symptom disorders, and chronic fatigue syndrome (CFS).

=== Kynurenine/tryptophan ratio ===
Changes in the ratio of kynurenine versus tryptophan are reported for many diseases like arthritis, HIV/AIDS, neuropsychiatric disorders, cancer and inflammations. The kynurenin/tryptophan is also an indicator for the activity of indoleamine 2,3-dioxygenase (IDO).

== Methods ==
Kynurenine metabolites can be quantified using liquid chromatography coupled to mass spectrometry.

== Related substrates ==
In some species, the kynurenine pathway also processes 6-bromotryptophan, leading to the analogous series of brominated metabolites. These and subsequent derivatives are believed to be responsible for the biofluorescence observed in the skin of the swell shark and the chain catshark.
