= Kynurenine =

l-Kynurenine

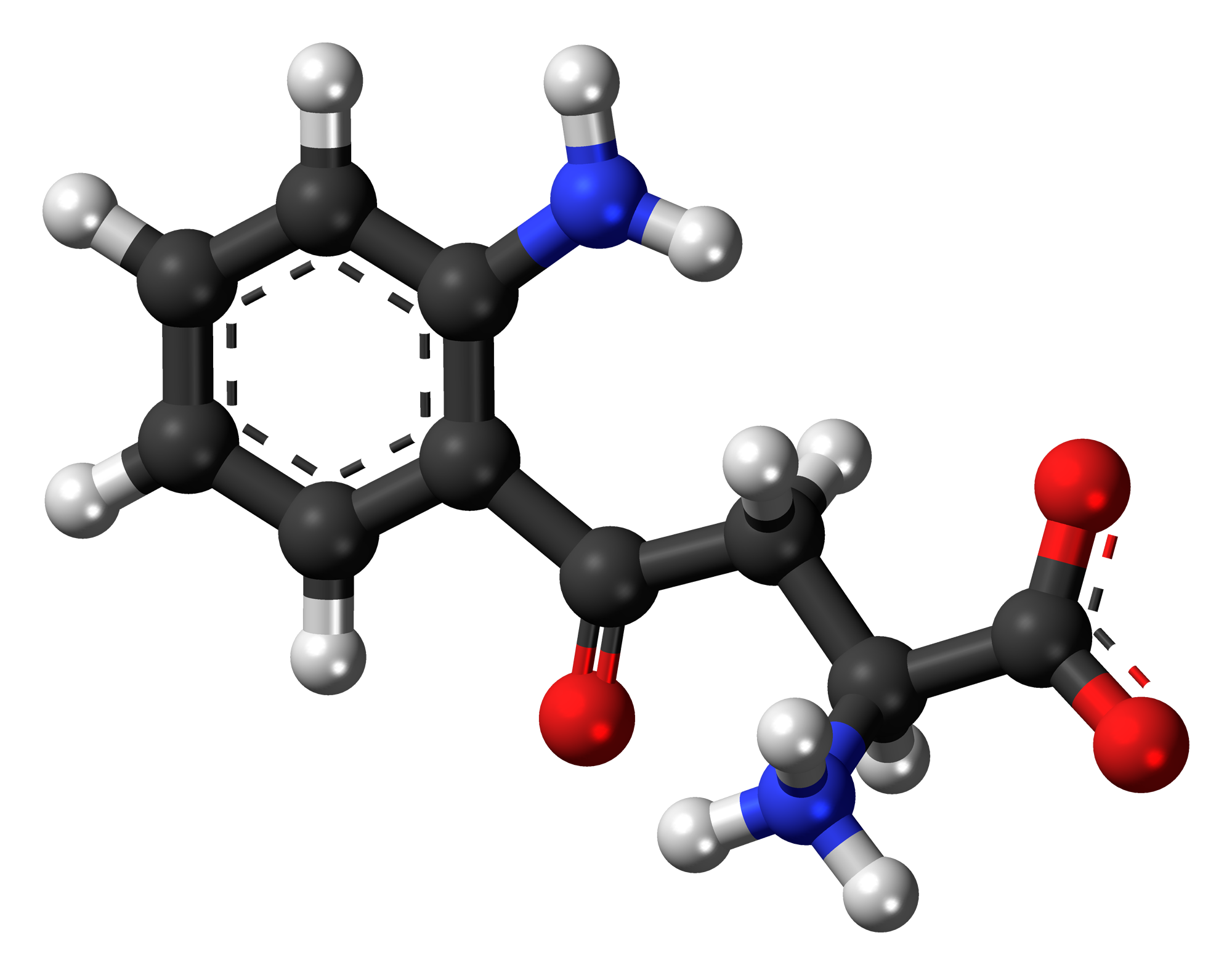

Names
- Preferred IUPAC name (2S)-2-Amino-4-(2-aminophenyl)-4-oxo-butanoic acid
- Other names (S)-Kynurenine

Identifiers
CAS Number	343-65-7 (d/l); 2922-83-0 (l); 13441-51-5 (d)
3D model (JSmol)	Interactive image
ChEBI	CHEBI:57959
ChEMBL	ChEMBL498416
ChemSpider	141580
DrugBank	DB02070
MeSH	Kynurenine
PubChem CID	846 (d/l); 1152206 (d); 161166 (l)
UNII	02JW4J5R44
CompTox Dashboard (EPA)	DTXSID101031182
- InChI: InChI=1S/C10H12N2O3/c11-7-4-2-1-3-6(7)9(13)5-8(12)10(14)15/h1-4,8H,5,11-12H2,(H,14,15)/t8-/m0/s1 Key: YGPSJZOEDVAXAB-QMMMGPOBSA-N
- SMILES: c1ccc(c(c1)C(=O)C[C@@H](C(=O)O)N)N

Properties
Chemical formula	C_{10}H_{12}N_{2}O_{3}
Molar mass	208.217 g·mol^{−1}
- Except where otherwise noted, data are given for materials in their standard state (at 25 °C [77 °F], 100 kPa). Infobox references

l-Kynurenine is a metabolite of the amino acid l-tryptophan used in the production of niacin.

Kynurenine is synthesized by the enzyme tryptophan dioxygenase, which is made primarily but not exclusively in the liver, and indoleamine 2,3-dioxygenase, which is made in many tissues in response to immune activation. An important source is the intestine. Kynurenine and its further breakdown products carry out diverse biological functions, including dilating blood vessels during inflammation and regulating the immune response. Some cancers increase kynurenine production, which increases tumor growth.

== Biosynthesis ==
Kynurenine gives its name to the kynurenine pathway which leads from the amino acid tryptophan to many important enzyme cofactors including niacin and nicotinamide adenine dinucleotide.

tryptophan
IDO1
O_{2}
N'-Formylkynurenine
AFMID
H_{2}O
kynurenine
+
formic acid

Three enzymes present in different organisms and tissues are known to catalyse the oxidation of the pyrrole ring in tryptophan, giving the N-formyl deriative which is subsequently hydrolysed to kynurenine. These are tryptophan dioxygenase, indoleamine 2,3-dioxygenase and indoleamine 2,3-dioxygenase 2.

The kynurenine pathway, which connects tryptophan with quinolinic acid and also gives kynurenic acid.

== Metabolism ==
In the main pathway to quinolinic acid, the next step is an oxidation reaction catalysed by kynurenine 3-hydroxylase, which uses oxygen and nicotinamide adenine dinucleotide phosphate (NADPH) to place a phenolic group next to the aromatic amine.

kynurenine
+ NADPH
O_{2} + H^{+}
H_{2}O
3-hydroxykynurenine
+ NADP^{+}

In an alternative metabolic process which is enhanced in inflammatory responses, the enzyme kynureninase produces anthranilic acid and L-alanine.

kynurenine
H_{2}O
anthranilic acid
+
alanine

A third outcome for metabolism is by the action of kynurenine-oxoglutarate transaminase, which gives kynurenic acid by transamination with α-ketoglutaric acid.

kynurenine
+
α-ketoglutaric acid
H_{2}O
kynurenic acid
+
L-glutamic acid

== Clinical effects ==
Kynurenine protects the eye by absorbing UV light, especially in the UVA region (315–400 nm). Kynurenine is present in the lens and retina as one of multiple tryptophan derivatives produced in the eye, including 3-hydroxykynurenine, that together provide UV protection and aid in enhancing visual acuity. The use of kynurenine as a UV filter is consistent with its photostability and low photosensitization, owing to its efficient relaxation from the UV-induced excited state. The concentration of this UV filter decreases with age, and this loss of free kynurenine and the concomitant formation of relatively more photosensitizing kynurenine derivatives and kynurenine-protein conjugates may contribute to the formation of cataracts.

Evidence suggests that increased kynurenine production may precipitate depressive symptoms associated with interferon treatment for hepatitis C. Cognitive deficits in schizophrenia are associated with imbalances in the enzymes that break down kynurenine. Blood levels of kynurenine are reduced in people with bipolar disorder. Kynurenine production is increased in Alzheimer's disease and cardiovascular disease where its metabolites are associated with cognitive deficits and depressive symptoms. Kynurenine is also associated with tics. Myokines regulate its metabolism.

Kynurenine has also been identified as one of two compounds that makes up the pigment that gives the goldenrod crab spider its yellow color.

== Kynurenine pathway dysfunction ==
Dysfunctional states of distinct steps of the kynurenine pathway have been described for a number of disorders, including:

- Psychiatric disorders (such as schizophrenia, bipolar disorder, major depression, anxiety disorders)
- Myalgic encephalomyelitis/chronic fatigue syndrome

Downregulation of kynurenine-3-monooxygenase (KMO) can be caused by genetic polymorphisms, cytokines, or both. KMO deficiency leads to an accumulation of kynurenine and to a shift within the tryptophan metabolic pathway towards kynurenine acid and anthranilic acid. This deficiency is associated with disorders of the brain (e.g. major depressive disorder, bipolar disorder, schizophrenia, tic disorders) and of the liver.

== Drug development ==
It is hypothesized that the kynurenine pathway is partly responsible for the therapeutic effect of lithium on bipolar disorder. If that is the case, it could be a target of drug discovery.
