= Indoleamine 2,3-dioxygenase 2 =

Protein-coding gene in the species Homo sapiens

IDO2

Identifiers
- Aliases: IDO2, INDOL1, indoleamine 2,3-dioxygenase 2
- External IDs: OMIM: 612129; MGI: 2142489; GeneCards: IDO2

Gene location (Human)
Chr.	Chromosome 8 (human)
Band	8p11.21	Start	39,934,614 bp
Band	8p11.21	End	40,016,392 bp

Gene location (Mouse)
Chr.	Chromosome 8 (mouse)
Band	8|8 A2	Start	25,021,908 bp
Band	8|8 A2	End	25,066,349 bp
RNA expression pattern
Bgee	Human / Mouse (ortholog); Top expressed in: right lobe of liver; testicle; placenta; left lobe of thyroid gland; right lobe of thyroid gland; appendix; gonad; endometrium; lymph node; right testis / Top expressed in: right kidney; proximal tubule; zygote; secondary oocyte; liver; embryo; embryo; left lobe of liver; tail of embryo; epiblast; More reference expression data
BioGPS	n/a
Gene ontology
Molecular function	oxidoreductase activity; indoleamine 2,3-dioxygenase activity; tryptophan 2,3-dioxygenase activity; heme binding; dioxygenase activity; metal ion binding
Cellular component	cytoplasm; cytosol
Biological process	tryptophan catabolic process; immune system process; tryptophan catabolic process to kynurenine; 'de novo' NAD biosynthetic process from tryptophan
Sources:Amigo / QuickGO
Orthologs
Databases	NCBI: entry; OMA: entry
Species	Human	Mouse
Entrez	169355	209176
Ensembl	ENSG00000188676	ENSMUSG00000031549
UniProt	Q6ZQW0	Q8R0V5
RefSeq (mRNA)	NM_194294; NM_001395206	NM_145949
RefSeq (protein)	NP_919270	NP_666061
Location (UCSC)	Chr 8: 39.93 – 40.02 Mb	Chr 8: 25.02 – 25.07 Mb
PubMed search
- Wikidata
View/Edit Human	View/Edit Mouse

Indoleamine 2,3-dioxygenase 2 (IDO2) is a protein that in humans is encoded by the IDO2 gene.

== Function ==
IDO2 (indolamine-2,3-dioxygenase) is an enzyme with protein size of 420 amino acids (47 kDa) that is used for catabolism of tryptophan. It is the first enzyme on the kynurenine pathway and cleaves the pyrrole ring.

Tryptophan
O_{2}
N'-Formylkynurenine

In organisms, other enzymes participate in L-tryptophan cleavage, namely IDO1 and TDO. Despite IDO1 and IDO2 being closely related enzymes originating by gene duplication and sharing high level (43%) of sequence homology, they differentiate by their kinetics, function and expression pattern. Genes encoding IDO1 and IDO2 have similar genomic structure and are situated closely to each other on chromosome 8. IDO2 is produced in a very limited type of tissues as kidney, liver or antigen presenting cells. IDO2 is less active on substrates of IDO1, better catabolizing other Trp derivates as 5-methoxytryptophan. There are several isoforms in population that comes from alternative splicing. As well as IDO1, IDO2 has been reported in Treg differentiation in vitro, suggesting a role in tolerance maintenance. Its expression has been found in several cancers, gastric, colon or renal tumors.
