= 3-Hydroxykynurenine =

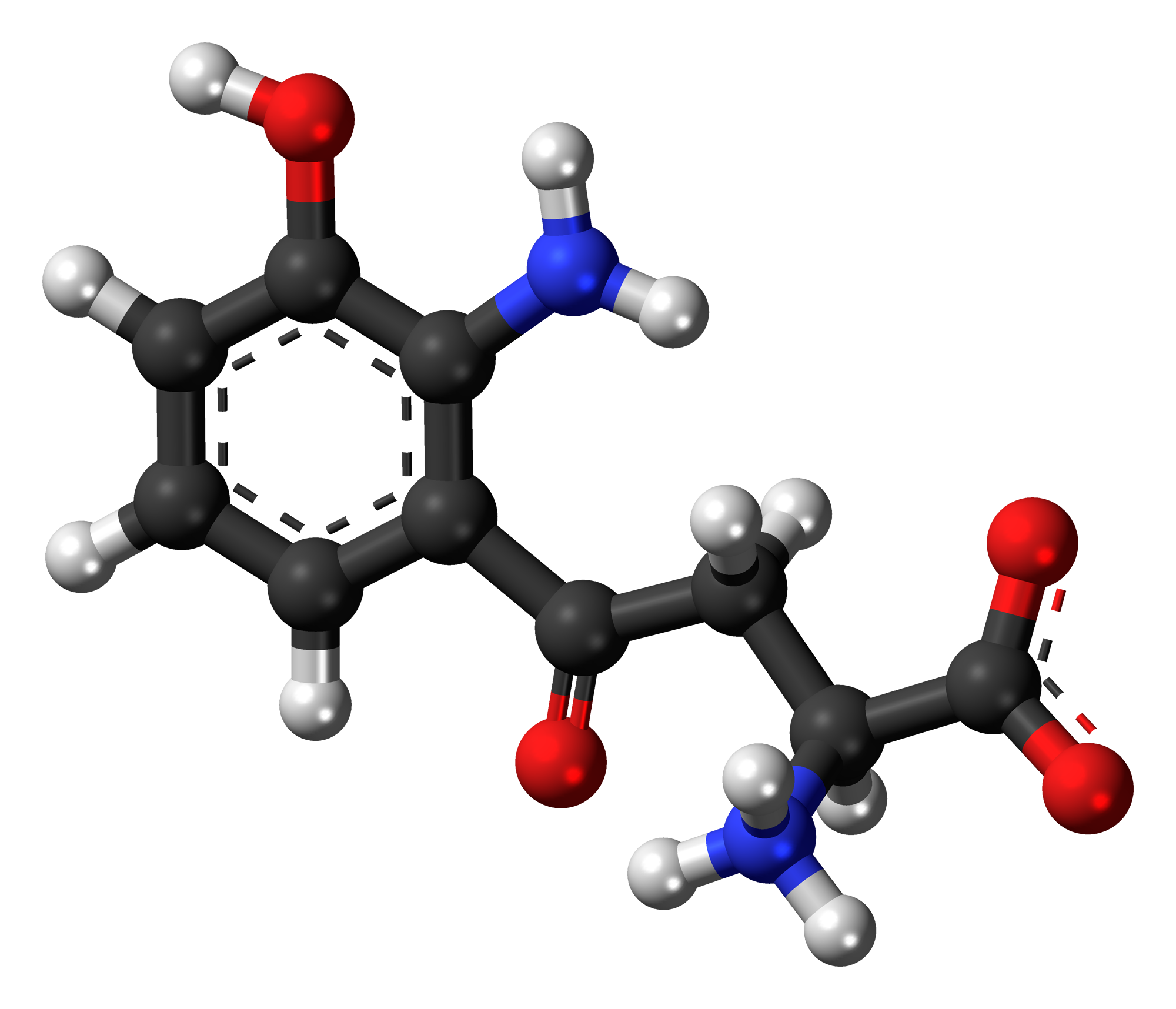

Names
- IUPAC name 2-Amino-4-(2-amino-3-hydroxyphenyl)-4-oxobutanoic acid

Identifiers
CAS Number	606-14-4
3D model (JSmol)	Interactive image
ChEBI	CHEBI:1547
ChEMBL	ChEMBL1371152
ChemSpider	11318
KEGG	C03227
MeSH	3-hydroxykynurenine
PubChem CID	11811
UNII	F459WK6M6B
CompTox Dashboard (EPA)	DTXSID00862009
- InChI: InChI=1S/C10H12N2O4/c11-6(10(15)16)4-8(14)5-2-1-3-7(13)9(5)12/h1-3,6,13H,4,11-12H2,(H,15,16)/t6-/m0/s1 Key: VCKPUUFAIGNJHC-LURJTMIESA-N; InChI=1/C10H12N2O4/c11-6(10(15)16)4-8(14)5-2-1-3-7(13)9(5)12/h1-3,6,13H,4,11-12H2,(H,15,16) Key: VCKPUUFAIGNJHC-UHFFFAOYAF
- SMILES: C1=CC(=C(C(=C1)O)N)C(=O)CC(C(=O)O)N

Properties
Chemical formula	C_{10}H_{12}N_{2}O_{4}
Molar mass	224.21 g/mol
- Except where otherwise noted, data are given for materials in their standard state (at 25 °C [77 °F], 100 kPa). Infobox references

3-Hydroxykynurenine is a metabolite of tryptophan, which filters UV light in the human lens. It is one of two pigments identified as responsible for the goldenrod crab spider's (Misumena vatia) yellow coloration.

The Kynurenine pathway, which connects quinolinic acid to tryptophan. The pathway is named for the first intermediate, kynurenine, which is a precursor to kynurenic acid and 3-hydroxykynurenine.

== See also ==
- Kynurenine
- Ommochrome
