= Tryptophan 2,3-dioxygenase =

Mammalian protein found in Homo sapiens

TDO2
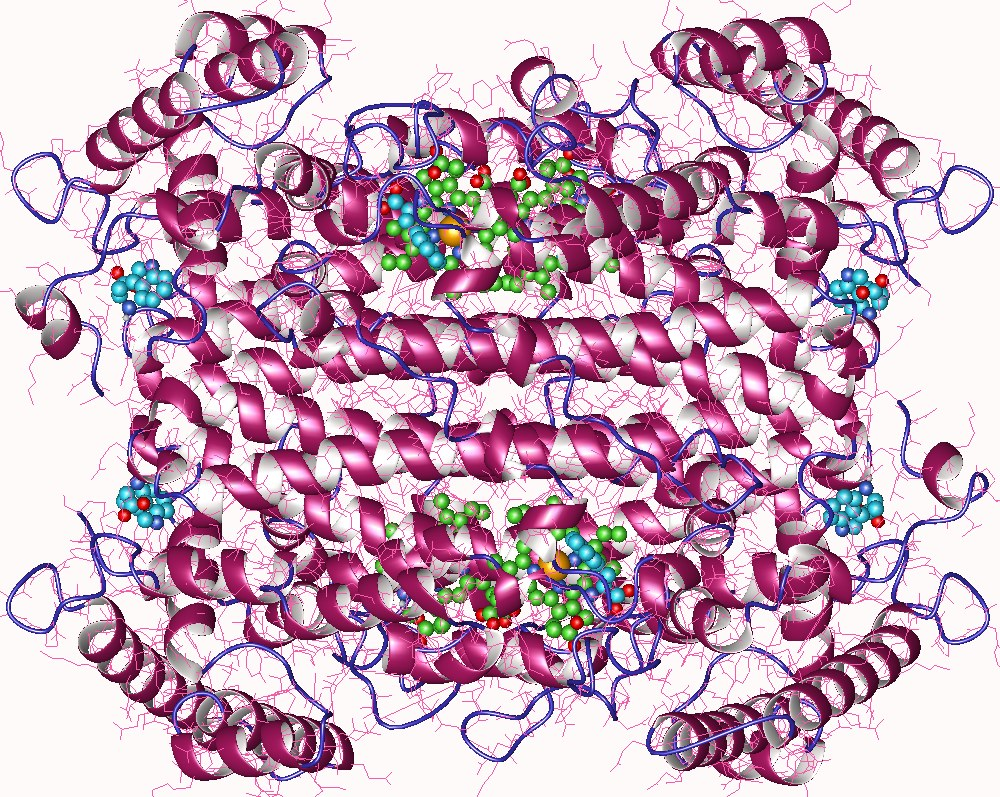

Identifiers
- Aliases: TDO2, TDO, TO, TPH2, TRPO, tryptophan 2,3-dioxygenase, HYPTRP
- External IDs: OMIM: 191070; MGI: 1928486; GeneCards: TDO2
Available structures
PDB	Ortholog search: PDBe RCSB
PDB	List of PDB id codes 4PW8
Enzyme activity
EC #	BRENDA	ExPASy	KEGG	MetaCyc
1.13.11.11	↗	↗	↗	↗

Gene location (Human)
Chr.	Chromosome 4 (human)
Band	4q32.1	Start	155,854,738 bp
Band	4q32.1	End	155,920,406 bp

Gene location (Mouse)
Chr.	Chromosome 3 (mouse)
Band	3|3 E3	Start	81,864,397 bp
Band	3|3 E3	End	81,883,509 bp
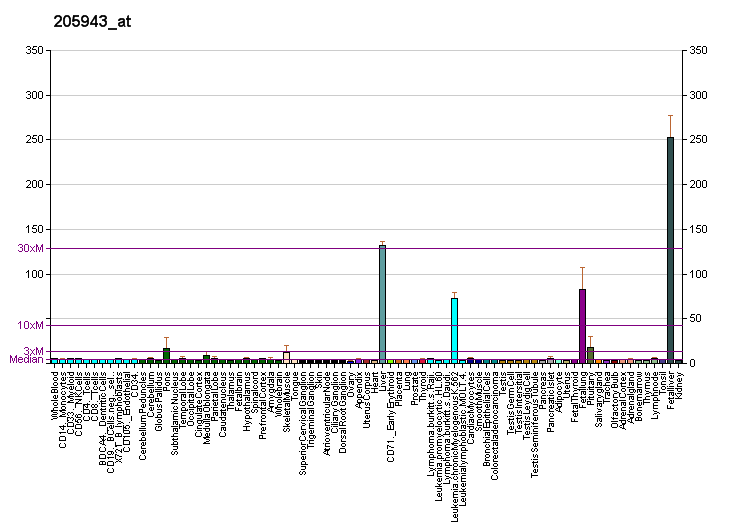
RNA expression pattern
Bgee	Human / Mouse (ortholog); Top expressed in: right lobe of liver; appendix; testicle; gonad; duodenum; lymph node; pituitary gland; gallbladder; anterior pituitary; rectum / Top expressed in: gastrula; left lobe of liver; gallbladder; decidua; Ileal epithelium; yolk sac; embryo; dentate gyrus of hippocampal formation granule cell; lumbar subsegment of spinal cord; primitive streak; More reference expression data
BioGPS	More reference expression data
Gene ontology
Molecular function	oxygen binding; oxidoreductase activity; protein binding; dioxygenase activity; amino acid binding; metal ion binding; identical protein binding; tryptophan 2,3-dioxygenase activity; heme binding
Cellular component	cytosol
Biological process	tryptophan catabolic process; tryptophan catabolic process to acetyl-CoA; tryptophan metabolic process; tryptophan catabolic process to kynurenine; protein homotetramerization; response to nitroglycerin
Sources:Amigo / QuickGO
Orthologs
Databases	NCBI: entry; OMA: entry
Species	Human	Mouse
Entrez	6999	56720
Ensembl	ENSG00000262635; ENSG00000151790	ENSMUSG00000028011
UniProt	P48775	P48776
RefSeq (mRNA)	NM_005651	NM_019911
RefSeq (protein)	NP_005642	NP_064295
Location (UCSC)	Chr 4: 155.85 – 155.92 Mb	Chr 3: 81.86 – 81.88 Mb
PubMed search
- Wikidata
View/Edit Human	View/Edit Mouse

In enzymology, tryptophan 2,3-dioxygenase (EC 1.13.11.11) is a heme enzyme that catalyzes the oxidation of L-tryptophan (L-Trp) to N-formyl-L-kynurenine, as the first and rate-limiting step of the kynurenine pathway.

Tryptophan
O_{2}
N′-Formylkynurenine

Tryptophan 2,3-dioxygenase plays a central role in the physiological regulation of tryptophan flux in the human body, as part of the overall biological process of tryptophan metabolism. TDO catalyses the first and rate-limiting step of tryptophan degradation along the kynurenine pathway and thereby regulates systemic tryptophan levels. In humans, tryptophan 2,3-dioxygenase is encoded by the TDO2 gene.

== Function ==
Tryptophan 2,3-dioxygenase
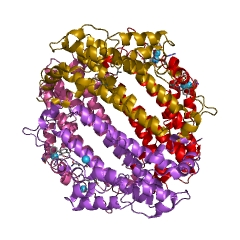
- Crystal structure of the tryptophan 2,3-dioxygenase from xanthomonas campestris

Identifiers
- EC no.: 1.13.11.11
- CAS no.: 9014-51-1

Databases
- BRENDA: enzyme data
- ExPASy: NiceZyme view
- KEGG: enzyme entry
- MetaCyc: metabolic pathway
- Rhea: reactions
- PDB structures: RCSB PDB PDBe PDBsum
- Gene Ontology: AmiGO / QuickGO
Search
- PMC: articles
- PubMed: articles
- NCBI: proteins

This enzyme belongs to the family of oxidoreductases, specifically those acting on single donors with O_{2} as oxidant and incorporation of two atoms of oxygen into the substrate (oxygenases). This family includes tryptophan 2,3-dioxygenase (TDO, also sometimes referred to as tryptophan oxygenase and L-tryptophan pyrrolase) and the closely related indoleamine 2,3-dioxygenase enzyme (IDO). Both TDO and IDO contain one noncovalently bound heme per monomer; TDO is usually tetrameric, whereas IDO is monomeric.

Tryptophan 2,3-dioxygenase was initially discovered in the 1930s and is found in both eukaryotes and prokaryotes. Expression of tryptophan 2,3-dioxygenase in mammals is normally restricted to the liver, but it has been identified in the brain and epididymis of some species, and, in some tissues, its production can be induced in response to stimuli. TDO from rat was the first to be expressed recombinantly (in E. coli). Human TDO has also been expressed.

The same family of enzymes also includes an indole 2,3-dioxygenase from Shewanella oneidensis and PrnB, the second enzyme in the pyrrolnitrin biosynthesis pathway from Pseudomonas fluorescens, although dioxygenase activity has not been demonstrated for either as yet. In 2007, a new enzyme with the ability to catalyze L-tryptophan dioxygenation, IDO2, was identified.

== Structure ==
Tryptophan 2,3-dioxygenase is a heme-containing cytosolic enzyme encoded by gene TDO2. Crystallographic studies of Xanthomonas campestris TD and Ralstonia metallidurans TDO have revealed that their structures are essentially identical and are intimately associated homotetrameric enzymes. They are best described as a dimer of dimers because the N terminal residues of each monomer form part of the substrate binding site in an adjacent monomer. The proteins are completely helical, and a flexible loop, involved in L-tryptophan binding, is observed just outside the active-site pocket. This loop appears to be substrate-binding induced, as it is observed only in crystals grown in the presence of L-tryptophan.

There are two TDO structures available with substrate (tryptophan) bound.

== Mechanism ==
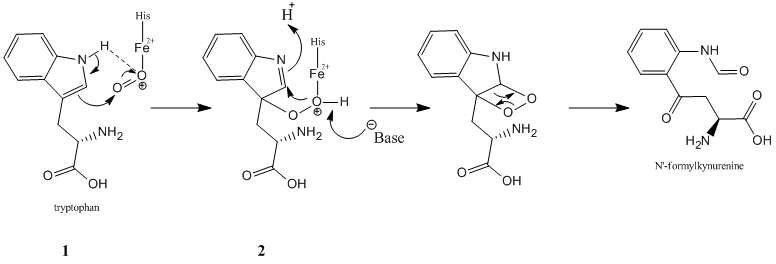
Proposed mechanism of action

Early proposals for the mechanism of tryptophan oxidation were presented by Sono and Dawson. This suggested a base-catalysed abstraction mechanism, involving only the ferrous (Fe^{II}) heme. It is assumed that TDO and IDO react by the same mechanism, although there is no concrete evidence for that. In IDO, a ferryl heme (Fe^{IV}) has been identified during turnover. Mechanistic proposals have therefore been adjusted to include the formation of ferryl heme during the mechanism. TDO is assumed to react in the same way, but a ferryl heme has not been observed in TDO. See also discussion of mechanism for indoleamine 2,3-dioxygenase.

== Clinical significance ==
It has been shown that tryptophan 2,3-dioxygenase is expressed in a significant proportion of human tumors. In the same study, tryptophan 2,3-dioxygenase expression by tumors prevented their rejection by immunized mice. A tryptophan 2,3-dioxygenase inhibitor developed by the group restored the ability of these mice to reject tryptophan 2,3-dioxygenase-expressed tumors, demonstrating that tryptophan 2,3-dioxygenase inhibitors display potential in cancer therapy.

Another study showed that tryptophan 2,3-dioxygenase is potentially involved in the metabolic pathway responsible for anxiety-related behavior. Generating mice deficient for tryptophan 2,3-dioxygenase and comparing them to the wild type, the group found that the tryptophan 2,3-dioxygenase-deficient mice showed increased plasma levels not only of tryptophan, but also of serotonin and 5-HIAA in the hippocampus and midbrain. A variety of tests, such as elevated plus maze and open-field tests showed anxiolytic modulation in these knock-out mice, the findings demonstrating a direct link between tryptophan 2,3-dioxygenase and tryptophan metabolism and anxiety-related behavior under physiological conditions.

== See also ==
- Heme
- Indoleamine 2,3-dioxygenase
- Kynurenine
- Tryptophan
