= Xanthurenic acid =

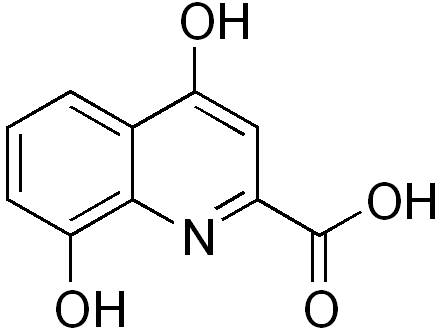

Names
- Preferred IUPAC name 4,8-Dihydroxyquinoline-2-carboxylic acid
- Other names Xanthuric acid Xanthurenate; 8-Hydroxykynurenic acid 4,8-Dihydroxyquinaldic acid

Identifiers
CAS Number	59-00-7
3D model (JSmol)	Interactive image
ChEBI	CHEBI:10072
ChemSpider	5497
ECHA InfoCard	100.000.373
EC Number	200-410-1
KEGG	C02470
PubChem CID	5699
UNII	58LAB1BG8J
CompTox Dashboard (EPA)	DTXSID90207728
- InChI: InChI=1S/C10H7NO4/c12-7-3-1-2-5-8(13)4-6(10(14)15)11-9(5)7/h1-4,12H,(H,11,13)(H,14,15) Key: FBZONXHGGPHHIY-UHFFFAOYSA-N; InChI=1/C10H7NO4/c12-7-3-1-2-5-8(13)4-6(10(14)15)11-9(5)7/h1-4,12H,(H,11,13)(H,14,15) Key: FBZONXHGGPHHIY-UHFFFAOYAE
- SMILES: OC2=CC(C(O)=O)=NC1=C(O)C=CC=C12

Properties
Chemical formula	C_{10}H_{7}NO_{4}
Molar mass	205.169 g·mol^{−1}
Appearance	Yellow crystals
Melting point	286 °C (547 °F; 559 K)
Solubility in water	Insoluble
- Except where otherwise noted, data are given for materials in their standard state (at 25 °C [77 °F], 100 kPa). verify (what is ?) Infobox references

Xanthurenic acid, or xanthurenate, is a metabolic intermediate that accumulates and is excreted by pyridoxine (vitamin B_{6}) deficient animals after the ingestion of tryptophan.

Xanthurenic acid is suspected to be an endogenous agonist for Group II metabotropic glutamate receptors in humans. It is also known to be a potent VGLUT inhibitor, thereby preventing the movement of glutamate from the cytoplasm into synaptic vesicles, an action that it mediates via competitive blockade of vesicular glutamate transporters (K_{i} = 0.19 mM).

In 2015 researchers reported a marked reduction of xanthurenic acid levels in the serum of patients with schizophrenia. A recent meta-analysis showed that blood xanthurenic acid levels are lower in individuals suffering from bipolar disorder as well.

Xanthurenic acid has also been shown to induce gametogenesis of Plasmodium falciparum, the parasite that causes malaria. It is found in the gut of the Anopheles mosquito.

== See also ==
- Kynurenic acid
- 7-Chlorokynurenic acid
