= Kynureninase =

Mammalian protein found in Homo sapiens

kynureninase
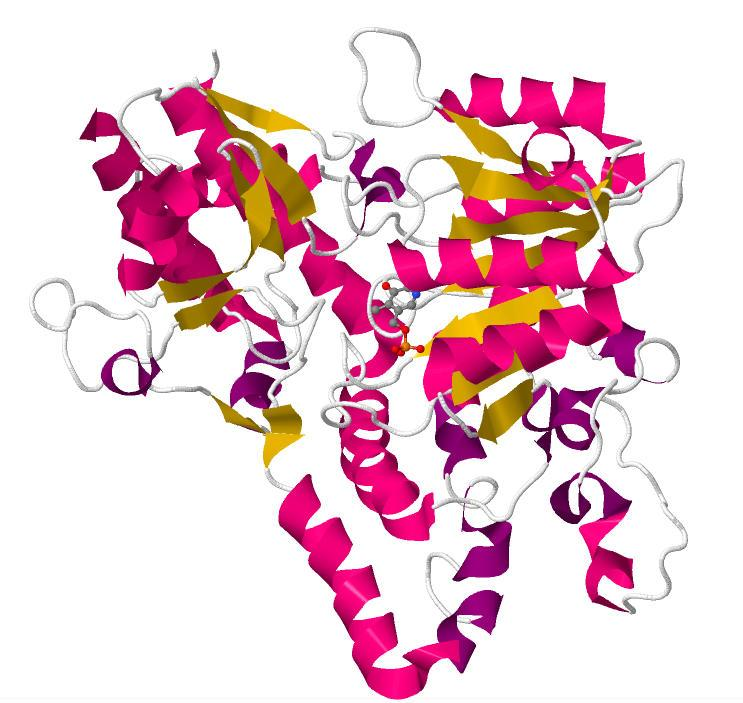
- Crystal structure of Homo sapiens kynureninase.

Identifiers
- EC no.: 3.7.1.3
- CAS no.: 9024-78-6

Databases
- BRENDA: enzyme data
- ExPASy: NiceZyme view
- KEGG: enzyme entry
- MetaCyc: metabolic pathway
- Rhea: reactions
- PDB structures: RCSB PDB PDBe PDBsum
- Gene Ontology: AmiGO / QuickGO
Search
- PMC: articles
- PubMed: articles
- NCBI: proteins

KYNU
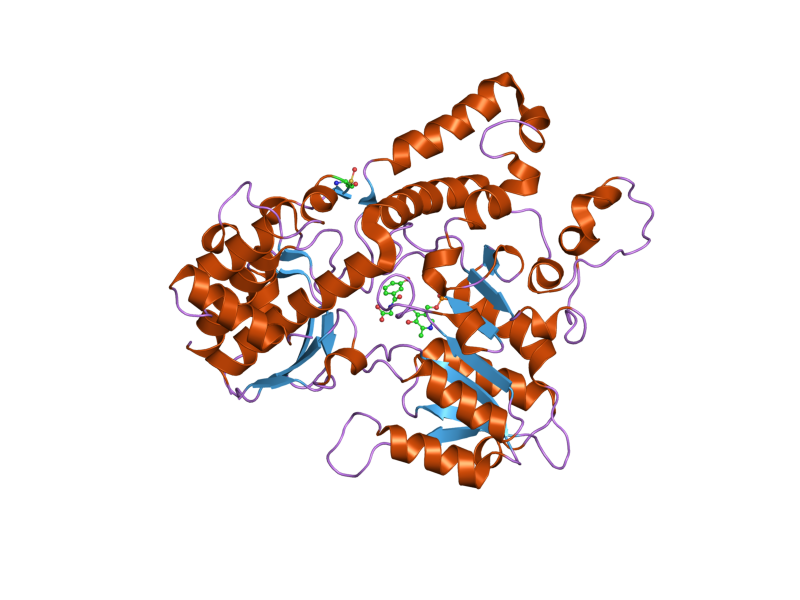

Identifiers
- Aliases: KYNU, KYNUU, kynureninase, VCRL2
- External IDs: OMIM: 605197; MGI: 1918039; GeneCards: KYNU
Available structures
PDB	Ortholog search: PDBe RCSB
PDB	List of PDB id codes 2HZP, 3E9K
Enzyme activity
EC #	BRENDA	ExPASy	KEGG	MetaCyc
3.7.1.3	↗	↗	↗	↗

Gene location (Human)
Chr.	Chromosome 2 (human)
Band	2q22.2	Start	142,877,657 bp
Band	2q22.2	End	143,055,833 bp

Gene location (Mouse)
Chr.	Chromosome 2 (mouse)
Band	2|2 B	Start	43,445,341 bp
Band	2|2 B	End	43,572,727 bp
RNA expression pattern
Bgee	Human / Mouse (ortholog); Top expressed in: palpebral conjunctiva; sperm; epithelium of nasopharynx; monocyte; liver; nasal epithelium; right lobe of liver; kidney tubule; mucosa of urinary bladder; granulocyte / Top expressed in: left lobe of liver; yolk sac; embryo; epithelium of lens; spleen; embryo; zygote; right kidney; blood; mesenteric lymph nodes; More reference expression data
BioGPS	n/a
Gene ontology
Molecular function	protein homodimerization activity; kynureninase activity; catalytic activity; pyridoxal phosphate binding; hydrolase activity; 3-hydroxykynureninase activity
Cellular component	cytosol; mitochondrion; cytoplasm; nucleoplasm
Biological process	pyridine nucleotide biosynthetic process; response to vitamin B6; response to interferon-gamma; tryptophan catabolic process to acetyl-CoA; L-kynurenine catabolic process; tryptophan catabolic process; tryptophan catabolic process to kynurenine; quinolinate biosynthetic process; anthranilate metabolic process; NAD biosynthetic process; 'de novo' NAD biosynthetic process from tryptophan; ageing
Sources:Amigo / QuickGO
Orthologs
Databases	NCBI: entry; OMA: entry
Species	Human	Mouse
Entrez	8942	70789
Ensembl	ENSG00000115919	ENSMUSG00000026866
UniProt	Q16719	Q9CXF0
RefSeq (mRNA)	NM_001032998; NM_001199241; NM_003937	NM_027552; NM_001289593; NM_001289594; NM_001398676
RefSeq (protein)	NP_001028170; NP_001186170; NP_003928	NP_001276522; NP_001276523; NP_081828; NP_001385605
Location (UCSC)	Chr 2: 142.88 – 143.06 Mb	Chr 2: 43.45 – 43.57 Mb
PubMed search
- Wikidata
View/Edit Human	View/Edit Mouse

Kynureninase or L-Kynurenine hydrolase (KYNU) (EC 3.7.1.3) is a pyridoxal-phosphate dependent enzyme that catalyses the cleavage of kynurenine into anthranilic acid. It can also act on 3-hydroxykynurenine (to produce 3-hydroxyanthranilate) and some other (3-arylcarbonyl)-alanines. Humans express one kynureninase enzyme that is encoded by the KYNU gene located on chromosome 2.

KYNU is part of the pathway for the catabolism of tryptophan and the biosynthesis of nicotinamide adenine dinucleotide (NAD) cofactors from tryptophan (Trp).

This reaction produces anthranilic acid and L-alanine:

kynurenine
H_{2}O
anthranilic acid
+
alanine

== Structure ==
Kynureninase belongs to the class V group of aspartate aminotransferase superfamily of structurally homologous pyridoxal 5'-phosphate (PLP) dependent enzymes. To date, two structures of human kynureninase have determined by X-ray diffraction with resolutions of 2.0 and 1.7 Å. Forty percent of the amino acids are arranged in an alpha helical and twelve percent are arranged in beta sheets. Docking of the kynurenine substrate into the active site suggests that Asn-333 and His-102 are involved in substrate binding.

== Function ==
In KYNU reaction, PLP facilitates C_{β}-C_{γ} bond cleavage. The reaction follows the same steps as the transamination reaction but does not hydrolyze the tautomerized Schiff base. The proposed reaction mechanism involves an attack of an enzyme nucleophile on the carbonyl carbon (C_{γ}) of the tautomerized 3hKyn-PLP Schiff base. This is followed by C_{β}-C_{γ} bond cleavage to generate an acyl-enzyme intermediate together with a tautomerized Ala-PLP adduct. Hydrolysis of the acyl-enzyme then yields 3hAnt.

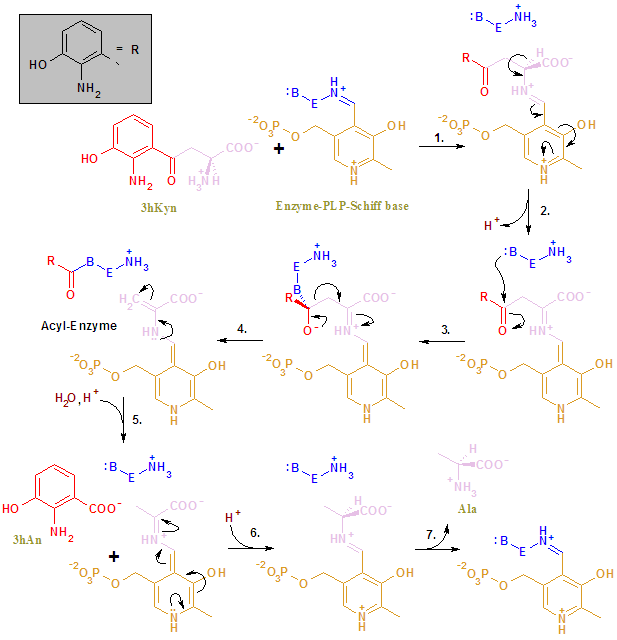
The KYNU's reaction mechanism. KYNU PLP substrate names inorganic molecules 3hAn's moiety Ala's moiety
