= Kynurenic acid =

- Chemical structure of kynurenic acid

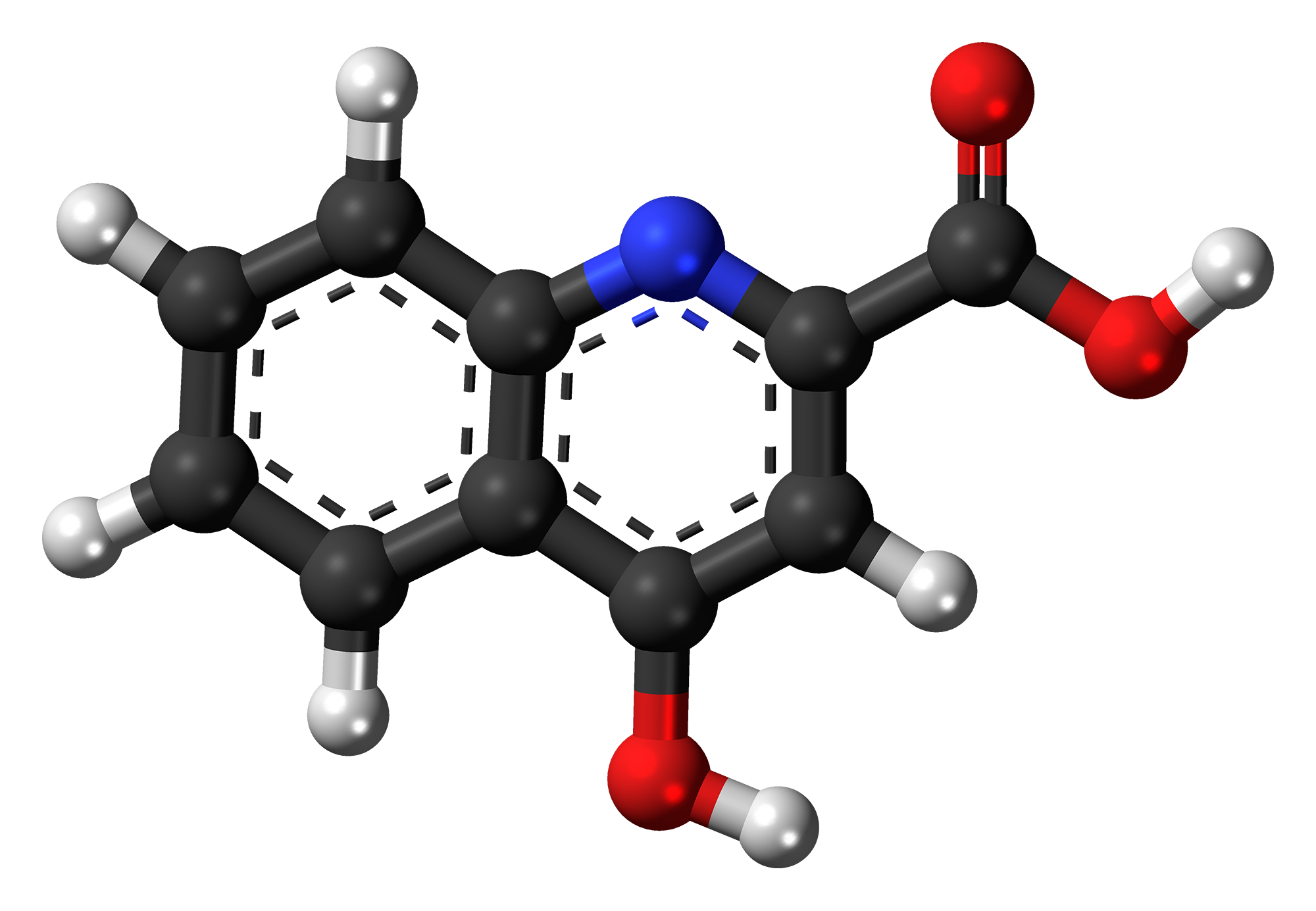

Names
- Preferred IUPAC name 4-Hydroxyquinoline-2-carboxylic acid
- Other names Kinurenic acid, kynuronic acid, quinurenic acid, transtorine

Identifiers
CAS Number	492-27-3
3D model (JSmol)	Interactive image
ChEBI	CHEBI:18344
ChEMBL	ChEMBL299155
ChemSpider	3712
DrugBank	DB11937
ECHA InfoCard	100.007.047
EC Number	207-751-5
IUPHAR/BPS	2918
KEGG	C01717
PubChem CID	3845
UNII	H030S2S85J
CompTox Dashboard (EPA)	DTXSID8075417
- InChI: InChI=1S/C10H7NO3/c12-9-5-8(10(13)14)11-7-4-2-1-3-6(7)9/h1-5H,(H,11,12)(H,13,14) Key: HCZHHEIFKROPDY-UHFFFAOYSA-N; InChI=1/C10H7NO3/c12-9-5-8(10(13)14)11-7-4-2-1-3-6(7)9/h1-5H,(H,11,12)(H,13,14) Key: HCZHHEIFKROPDY-UHFFFAOYAN
- SMILES: O=C\2c1c(cccc1)NC(=C/2)/C(=O)O

Properties
Chemical formula	C_{10}H_{7}NO_{3}
Molar mass	189.168 g/mol
Melting point	282.5 °C (540.5 °F; 555.6 K)
- Except where otherwise noted, data are given for materials in their standard state (at 25 °C [77 °F], 100 kPa). Infobox references

Kynurenic acid (KYNA or KYN) is a product of the normal metabolism of amino acid L-tryptophan. It has been shown that kynurenic acid possesses neuroactive activity. It acts as an antiexcitotoxic and anticonvulsant, most likely through acting as an antagonist at excitatory amino acid receptors. Because of this activity, it may influence important neurophysiological and neuropathological processes. As a result, kynurenic acid has been considered for use in therapy in certain neurobiological disorders. Conversely, increased levels of kynurenic acid have also been linked to certain pathological conditions.

Kynurenic acid was discovered in 1853 by the German chemist Justus von Liebig in dog urine, which it was apparently named after.

== Biosynthesis ==
Kynurenic acid is formed from kynurenine by transamination with α-ketoglutaric acid in a reaction catalyzed by the enzyme kynurenine—oxoglutarate transaminase.

kynurenine
+
α-ketoglutaric acid
H_{2}O
kynurenic acid
+
L-glutamic acid

The precursor, kynurenine, is produced from the amino acid tryptophan in a sequence of reactions that form the kynurenine pathway.

== Mechanism of action ==
KYNA has been proposed to act on five targets:

- As an antagonist at ionotropic AMPA, NMDA and Kainate glutamate receptors in the concentration range of 0.1-2.5 mM.
- As a noncompetitive antagonist at the glycine site of the NMDA receptor.
- As an antagonist of the α7 nicotinic acetylcholine receptor. However, recently (2011) direct recording of α7 nicotinic acetylcholine receptor currents in adult (noncultured) hippocampal interneurons by the Cooper laboratory validated a 2009 study that failed to find any blocking effect of kynurenic acid across a wide range of concentrations, thus suggesting that in noncultured, intact preparations from adult animals there is no effect of kynurenic acid on α7 nicotinic acetylcholine receptor currents.
- As a ligand for the orphan G protein-coupled receptor GPR35.
- As an agonist for the G protein-coupled receptor HCAR3.

== Role in disease ==
High levels of kynurenic acid have been identified in patients with tick-borne encephalitis, schizophrenia and HIV-related illnesses. In all these situations, increased levels were associated with confusion and psychotic symptoms. Kynurenic acid acts in the brain as a glycine-site NMDAr antagonist, key in glutamatergic neurotransmission system, which is thought to be involved in the pathophysiology and pathogenesis of schizophrenia.

The kynurenic acid hypothesis of schizophrenia was proposed in 2007, based on its action on midbrain dopamine activity and NMDArs, thus linking dopamine hypothesis of schizophrenia with the glutamate hypothesis of the disease.

Kynurenic acid is reduced in individuals with mood disorders, such as major depressive disorder and bipolar disorder, especially during depressive episodes.

High levels of kynurenic acid have been identified in human urine in certain metabolic disorders, such as marked pyridoxine deficiency and deficiency/absence of kynureninase.

When researchers decreased the levels of kynurenic acid in the brains of mice, their cognition was shown to improve markedly. However, kynurenic acid also shows neuroprotective properties. Some researchers have posited that the increased levels found in cases of neurological degradation is due to a failed attempt to protect the cells.

Elevated levels of kynurenic acid compared to kynurenine appear to be associated with poorer T cell response and higher mortality in male subjects with COVID-19, suggesting an explanation for the poorer clinical outcomes observed in males than in females.

== Link to ketogenic diet ==
One controlled study kept mice on a ketogenic diet and measured kynurenic acid concentrations in different parts of the brain. It found that the mice on the ketogenic diet had greater kynurenic acid concentrations in the striatum and hippocampus compared to mice on a normal diet, with no significant difference in the cortex.

In response to the studies showing detrimental behaviour following increases in kynurenic acid the authors also note that the diet was generally well tolerated by the animals, with no "gross behavioural abnormalities". They posit that the increases in concentrations found were insufficient to produce behavioural changes seen in those studies.

== See also ==
- Xanthurenic acid
