= C8H11N =

The molecular formula C_{8}H_{11}N (molar mass: 121.18 g/mol) may refer to:

- Bicyclo(2.2.1)heptane-2-carbonitrile
- Collidines (trimethylpyridines)
  - 2,3,4-Trimethylpyridine
  - 2,3,5-Trimethylpyridine
  - 2,3,6-Trimethylpyridine
  - 2,4,5-Trimethylpyridine
  - 2,4,6-Trimethylpyridine
  - 3,4,5-Trimethylpyridine
- Dimethylaniline
- Phenethylamine
- 1-Phenylethylamine
- Xylidines
  - 2,3-Xylidine
  - 2,4-Xylidine
  - 2,5-Xylidine
  - 2,6-Xylidine
  - 3,4-Xylidine
  - 3,5-Xylidine
