= C7H8N2O =

The molecular formula C_{7}H_{8}N_{2}O (molar mass: 136.154 g/mol, exact mass: 136.0637 u) may refer to:

- Aminobenzamides
  - Anthranilamide (2-aminobenzamide)
  - 3-Aminobenzamide
  - 4-Aminobenzamide
- Benzoylhydrazine
- Nicotinyl methylamide
