= Azinphos-methyl =

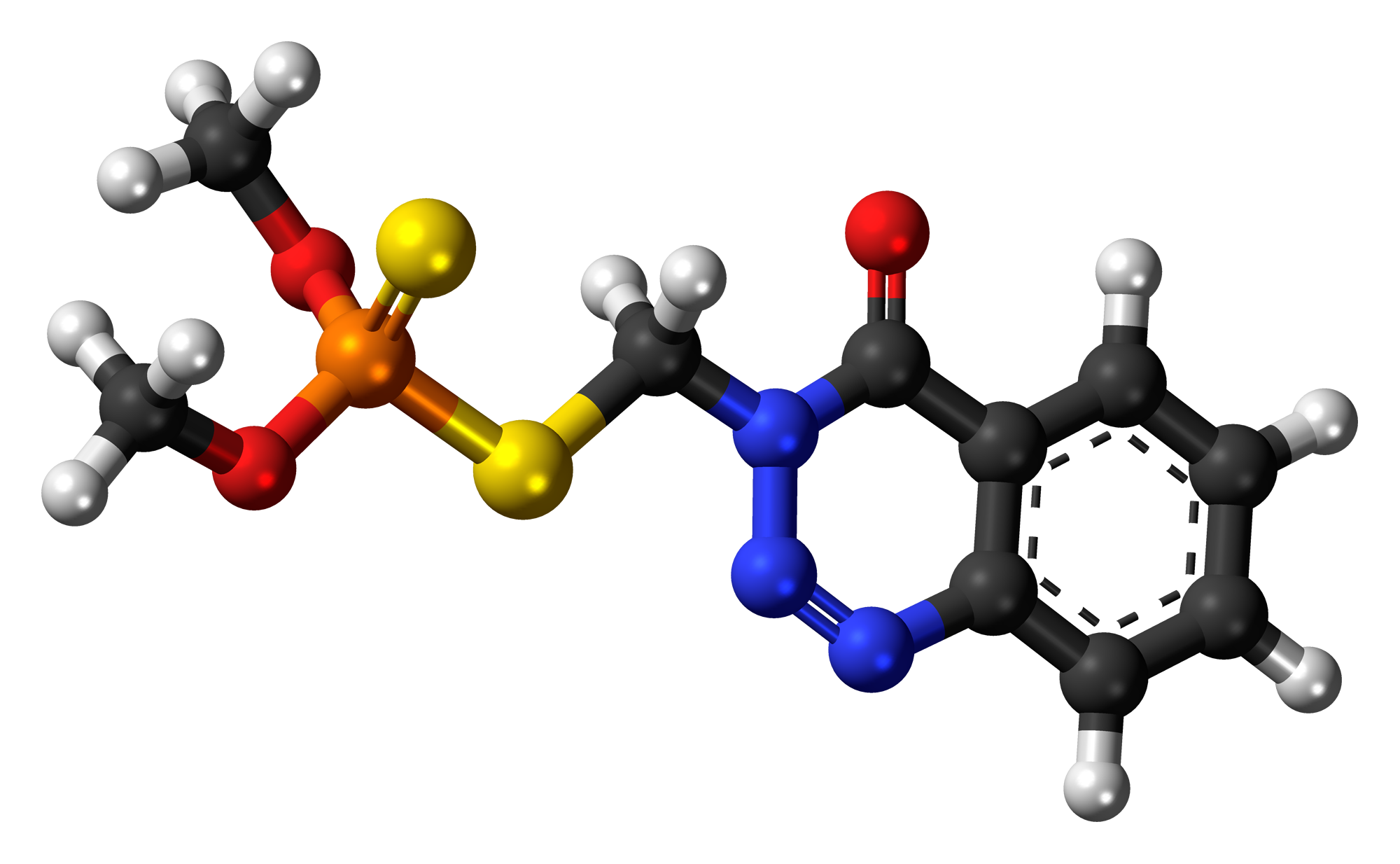

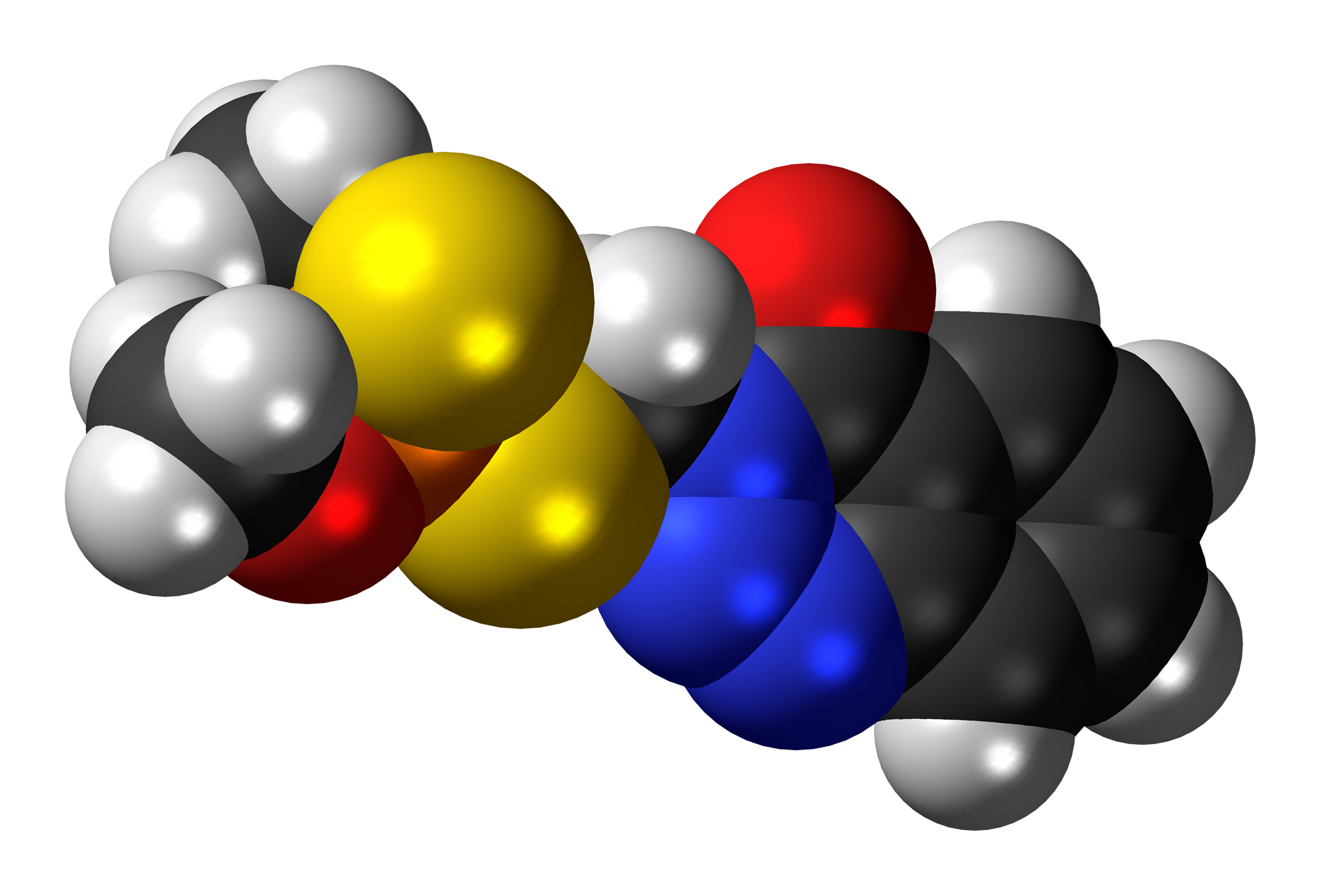

Names
- Preferred IUPAC name O,O-Dimethyl S-[(4-oxo-1,2,3-benzotriazin-3(4H)-yl)methyl] phosphorodithioate
- Other names Guthion, azinphosmethyl, azinphos

Identifiers
CAS Number	86-50-0
3D model (JSmol)	Interactive image; Interactive image; Interactive image
Abbreviations	AZM
Beilstein Reference	280476
ChEBI	CHEBI:2953
ChEMBL	ChEMBL530115
ChemSpider	2181
ECHA InfoCard	100.001.524
EC Number	201-676-1
KEGG	C11018
MeSH	Azinphosmethyl
PubChem CID	2268
RTECS number	TE1925000
UNII	265842EWUV
UN number	2811
CompTox Dashboard (EPA)	DTXSID3020122
- InChI: InChI=1S/C10H12N3O3PS2/c1-15-17(18,16-2)19-7-13-10(14)8-5-3-4-6-9(8)11-12-13/h3-6H,7H2,1-2H3 Key: CJJOSEISRRTUQB-UHFFFAOYSA-N
- SMILES: COP(=S)(OC)SCn1nnc2ccccc2c1=O; COP(=S)(OC)SCN1N=NC2=CC=CC=C2C1=O; O=C2N(CSP(OC)(OC)=S)N=NC1=CC=CC=C12

Properties
Chemical formula	C_{10}H_{12}N_{3}O_{3}PS_{2}
Molar mass	317.32 g·mol^{−1}
Appearance	Pale, dark orange, translucent crystals
Density	1.44 g cm^{−3}
Melting point	73 °C; 163 °F; 346 K
Boiling point	> 200 °C (392 °F; 473 K) (decomposes)
Solubility in water	28 mg dm^{−3}
log P	2.466
Vapor pressure	8 × 10^{−9} mmHg

Hazards
- GHS labelling
Pictograms	(GHS06: Toxic) (GHS09: Environmental hazard)
Signal word	Danger
Hazard statements	H300, H311, H317, H330, H410
Precautionary statements	P260, P264, P273, P280, P284, P301+P310
NFPA 704 (fire diamond)	3 2 1
Flash point	69 °C (156 °F; 342 K)
- Lethal dose or concentration (LD, LC)
LD_{50} (median dose)	16 mg/kg (rat, oral); 80 mg/kg (guinea pig, oral); 11 mg/kg (rat, oral); 13 mg/kg (rat, oral); 8.6 mg/kg (mouse, oral); 7 mg/kg (rat, oral); 8 mg/kg (mouse, oral); 10 mg/kg (dog, oral)
LC_{50} (median concentration)	69 mg/m^{3} (rat, 1 hr); 79 mg/m^{3} (rat, 1 hr)
- NIOSH (US health exposure limits)
PEL (Permissible)	TWA 0.2 mg/m^{3} [skin]
REL (Recommended)	TWA 0.2 mg/m^{3} [skin]
IDLH (Immediate danger)	10 mg/m^{3}
Safety data sheet (SDS)	External MSDS

Related compounds
Related organophosphates	Chlorpyrifos Malathion
- Except where otherwise noted, data are given for materials in their standard state (at 25 °C [77 °F], 100 kPa). verify (what is ?) Infobox references

Azinphos-methyl (Guthion) (also spelled azinophos-methyl) is a broad spectrum organophosphate insecticide manufactured by Bayer CropScience, Gowan Co., and Makhteshim Agan. Like other pesticides in this class, it owes its insecticidal properties (and human toxicity) to the fact that it is an acetylcholinesterase inhibitor (the same mechanism is responsible for the toxic effects of the V-series nerve agent chemical weapons). It is classified as an extremely hazardous substance in the United States as defined in Section 302 of the U.S. Emergency Planning and Community Right-to-Know Act (42 U.S.C. 11002), and is subject to strict reporting requirements by facilities which produce, store, or use it in significant quantities.

== History and uses ==
Azinphos-methyl is a neurotoxin derived from nerve agents developed during World War II. It was first registered in the US in 1959 as an insecticide and is also used as active ingredient in organophosphate (OP) pesticides. It is not registered for consumer or residential use. It has been linked to health problems of farmers who apply it, and the U.S. Environmental Protection Agency (EPA) considered a denial of reregistration, citing, “concern to farm workers, pesticide applicators, and aquatic ecosystems. The use of AZM has been fully banned in the USA since 30 September 2013, ending a phase-out period of twelve years. Azinphos-methyl has been banned in the European Union since 2006 and in Turkey since 2013. The New Zealand Environmental Risk Management Authority made a decision to phase out azinphos-methyl over a five-year period starting from 2009. In 2014, it was still used in Australia and partly in New Zealand.

== Available forms ==
AzM is often used as active ingredient in organophosphate pesticides like Guthion, Gusathion (GUS), Gusathion-M, Crysthyron, Cotnion, Cotnion-methyl, Metriltrizotion, Carfene, Bay 9027, Bay 17147, and R-1852. This is why Guthion is often used as a nickname for AzM. Studies have shown that pure AzM is less toxic than GUS. This increased toxicity can be explained by the interactions between the different compounds in the mixture.

== Synthesis ==
The synthesis (in this case, of carbon-14-labelled material) can be seen in figure 1. In the first step, o-nitroaniline (compound 1) is purified through dissolution in hot water-ethanol mixture in relation 2:1. [Activated carbon] is added and the result is filtrated for clarifying. The filtrate is chilled while kept in movement to generate crystals, usually at 4 °C, but if needed it can also be cooled to −10 °C. The crystals are then collected, washed and dried. If it is pure enough it is used for the following steps, which take place at 0 till 5 °C. To produce o-Nitrobenzonitrile-14C (compound 2), the first component o-nitroaniline and (concentrated reagent grade) hydrochloric acid are put together with ice and water. Sodium nitrite, dissolved in water, is added to this thin slurry. After the formation of a pale-yellow solution, which indicates the completion of the diazotization reaction, the pH should be adjusted to 6. After this, the solution is introduced to a mixture of cuprous cyanide and toluene. At room temperature the toluene layer is removed. The aqueous layer is washed and dried and the purified product is isolated by crystallization. The third product is Anthranilamide-14C (compound 3). It is formed out of o-Nitrobenzonitrile-14C, which is first solved in ethanol and hydrazine hydrate. The solvent is heated subsequently, treated in a well-ventilated hood with small periodic charges, smaller than 10 mg, of Raney nickel. Under nitrogen atmosphere the ethanolic solution is clarified and dried. The next step is to form 1,2,3-Benzotriazin-4(3H)-one-14C (compound 4). In water dissolved sodium nitrite is added to anthranilamide and hydrochloric acid in ice water. Because this is a diazotization reaction, the product is pale-yellow again. After this the pH is adjusted to 8,5. This causes the ring closure to form 1,2,3-Benzotriazin-4(3H)-one-14C. This results in a sodium salt slurry that can be treated with hydrochloric acid, what lowers the pH down to 2 till 4. The 1,2,3-Benzotriazin-4(3H)-one-14C is collected, washed and dried. In the following step 1,2,3-Benzotriazin-4-(3-chloromethyl)-one-14C has to be formed. Therefore, 1,2,3-Benzotriazin-4(3H)-one-14C and paraformaldehyde are added to ethylene dichloride and heated to 40 °C. Then thionyl chloride is added and the whole solvent is further heated to 65 °C. After four hours of heating the solution is cooled down to room temperature. Water is added and the solution is neutralized. The ethylene dichloride layer is removed and put together with the result of the washed aqueous layer. The solvent was filtered and dried. The last step is the actual synthesis of Azinphos methyl. Ethylene dichloride is added to the compound resulting from the fifth step, 1,2,3-Benzotriazin-4-(3-chloromethyl)-one-14C. This mixture is heated to 50 °C and sodium bicarbonate and O,O-dimethyl phosphorodithioate sodium salt in water are added. The ethylene dichloride layer is removed, reextracted with ethylene dichloride and purified by filtration. The pure filtrate is dried. This product is once again purified by recrystallization from methanol. What is left is pure azinphos-methyl in form of white crystals.

== Absorption ==
Azinphos-methyl can enter the body via inhalation, ingestion and dermal contact. Ingestion of azinphos-methyl is responsible for the low-dose exposure to a large part of the population, due to their presence as residues in food and drinking water. After ingestion it can be absorbed from the digestive tract. By skin contact, AzM can also enter the body through dermal cells. Absorption through the skin is responsible for the occupational exposure to relatively high doses, mainly in agriculture workers.

== Mechanism of toxicity ==
Once azinphos-methyl is absorbed it can cause neurotoxic effects, like other organophosphate insecticides. At high concentrations AzM itself can be toxic because it can function as an acetylcholinesterase (AChE) inhibitor. But its toxicity is mainly due to the bioactivation by a cytochrome P450 (CYP450)-mediated desulfuration to its phosphate triester or oxon(gutoxon) (see figure 2). Gutoxon can react with a serine hydroxyl group at the active site of the AChE. The active site is then blocked and AChE is inactivated. Under normal circumstances acetylcholinesterase rapidly and efficiently degrades the neurotransmitter acetylcholine (ACh) and thereby terminates the biological activity of acetylcholine. Inhibition of AChE results in an immediate accumulation of free unbound ACh at the ending of all cholinergic nerves, which leads to overstimulation of the nervous system.

== Efficacy and side effects ==
Cholinergic nerves play an important role in the normal function of the central nervous, endocrine, neuromuscular, immunological, and respiratory system. As all cholinergic fibers contain high concentrations of ACh and AChE at their terminals, inhibition of AChE can impair their function. So exposure to azinphosmethyl, whereas it inhibits AChEs, may disturb a lot of important systems and may have various effects. In the autonomic nervous system, accumulation of acetylcholine leads to the overstimulation of muscarinic receptors of the parasympathetic nervous system. This can affect exocrine glands (increased salivation, perspiration, lacrimation), the respiratory system (excessive bronchial secretions, tightness of the chest, and wheezing), the gastrointestinal tract (nausea, vomiting, diarrhea), the eyes (miosis, blurred vision) and the cardiovascular system (decrease in blood pressure, and bradycardia). Overstimulation of the nicotinic receptors in the para- or sympathetic nervous system may also cause adverse effects on the cardiovascular system, such as pallor, tachycardia and increased blood pressure. In the somatic nervous system, accumulation of acetylcholine may cause muscle fasciculation, paralysis, cramps, and flaccid or rigid tone. Overstimulation of the nerves in the central nervous system, specifically in the brain, may result in drowsiness, mental confusion and lethargy. More severe effects on the central nervous system include a state of coma without reflexes, cyanosis and depression of the respiratory centers. Thus the inhibition of the enzyme AChE may have a lot of different effects.

== Detoxification ==
To prevent the toxic effects, AzM can be biotransformed. Although AzM (in figure 2 named guthion) can be bioactivated by a cytochrome P450 (CYP450)-mediated desulfuration to its phosphate triester or oxon (gutoxon), it may also be detoxified by CYP itself (reaction 2 in figure 2). CYP450 is namely able to catalyze the oxidative cleavage of the P-S-C bond in AzM to yield DMTP and MMBA. The other pathways of detoxification involves glutathione (GSH)-mediated dealkylation via cleavage of the P-O-CH3 bond, which than forms mono-demethylated AzM and GS-CH3 (reaction 3 in figure 2). This mono-demethylated AzM may be further demethylated to di-demethylated AzM and again GS-CH3 (reaction 4 in figure 2). AzM also may undergo glutathione-catalyzed dearylation which forms DMPDT and glutathione-conjugated mercaptomethyl benzazimide (reaction 5 in figure 2) Gutoxon, the compound that mainly causes AzM to be toxic, can also be detoxified. Gutoxon can again be detoxified with the help of CYP450. CYP450 catalyzes the oxidative cleavage of gutoxon, which than yields DMP and MMBA (reaction 6 in figure 2). Other detoxification pathways of gutoxon are via glutathione-mediated dealkylation, which goes via cleavage of the P-O-CH3 bond to form demethylated AzM and GS-CH3 (reaction 7 in figure 2), and via glutathione-catalyzed dearylation to yield DMTP and glutathione-conjugated mercaptomethyl benzazimide (reaction 8 in figure 2).

== Treatment ==
There are two different main mechanism of treatment for toxification with AzM. One possibility is to treat the patient before exposure to AzM and the other one is to treat the patient after poisoning. Competitive antagonists of AChE can be used for pre-treatment. They can reduce mortality, which is caused by exposure to AzM. Organophosphorus AChE inhibitors can bind temporally to the catalytic site of the enzyme. Because of this binding, AzM cannot phosphorylate the enzyme anymore and the enzyme is shorter inhibited. The mechanism for treatment after exposure is to block the muscarinic receptor activation. Anticonvulsants are used to control the seizures and oximes are used to reactivate the inhibited AChE. Oximes remove the phosphoryl group bound to the active site of the AChE by binding to it. There are a few oximes that are the most efficacious by AzM poisoning, namely oxime K-27 and physostigmine. These two treatments are also used together, some patients are namely treated with atropine (a competitive antagonist of AChE) and reactivating oximes. When patients are resistant to atropine, the patients can be treated with low doses of anisodamine, a cholinergic and alpha-1 adrenergic antagonist, to achieve a shorter recovery time. Treatment with a combination of different alkaloids or synergistically with atropine is safer than using high antroponine concentrations, which can be toxic. Another possibility is to use membrane bioreactor technology. When this technology is used, no other chemical compounds need to be added. In general, pretreatment is much more efficient than post-treatment.

== Indications (biomarkers) ==
The most common biomarker for exposure to AzM is the inhibition of AChE. Also other esterase enzymes as CaE and BChE are inhibited by AzM. In general AzM exposure can be better detected by AChE inhibition than CaE inhibition. In amphibians and also zebrafish, AChE is a more sensitive biomarker for low AzM exposure-levels. As already mentioned in paragraph 7 “detoxification”, AzM can be metabolized into nontoxic dimethylated alkylphosphates (AP), with the help of CYP450 and glutathione. These APs are: dimethylphosphate (DM), dimethylthiophosphate (DMTP) and dimethyldithiophosphate (DMDTP). These three metabolites may be excreted into the urine and can be used as reliable biomarkers of exposure to AzM. However these metabolites are not specific to AzM, because other organophosphate pesticides might also be metabolized into the three alkylphosphates. The amount of erythrocyte acetylcholinesterase (RBE-AChE) in the blood can also be used as a biomarker of effect for AzM. According to Zavon (1965) RBC-AChE is the best indicator of AChE activity at the nerve synapse, because this closely parallels the level of AChE in the CNS and PNS. A depression of RBC-AChE will correlate with effects due to a rapid depression of AChE enzymes found in other tissues, this is due to the fact that both enzymes can be inhibited by AzM.

== Environmental degradation ==
AzM is very stable when dissolved in acidic, neutral or slightly alkaline water but above pH11 it is rapidly hydrolyzed to anthranilic acid, benzamide, and other chemicals. In natural water-rich environments microorganisms and sunlight cause AzM to break down faster, the half-life is highly variable depending on the condition, from several days to several months. Under the normal conditions, biodegradation and evaporation are the main routes of disappearance, after evaporation AzM has more exposure to UV-light, which causes photodecomposition. With little bioactivity and no exposure to UV light, it can reach half-lives of roughly a year.

== Effect on animals ==
Possible effects on animals are endocrine disruption, reproductive and immune dysfunction and cancer. A remarkable phenomenon that has been demonstrated in numerous animal studies is that repeated exposure to organophosphates causes the mammals to be less susceptible to the toxic effects of the AChE inhibitors, even though cholinesterase activities are not normal. This phenomenon is caused by the excess of agonists (ACh) within the synapse, ultimately leading to a down-regulation of cholinergic receptors. Consequently, a given concentration of ACh within the synapse causes fewer receptors to be available, which then causes a lower response. Studies have shown that the AChEs in fish brains are more prone to organophosphates than amphibian brains. This can be explained by the affinity for AzM and rate of phosphorylation of the enzymes. Frog brain AChE has for example a lower affinity for AzM and a slower rate of phosphorylation than fish brain AChE. The effects on amphibians are “reduced size, notochord bending, abnormal pigmentation, defective gut and gills, swimming in circles, body shortening, and impaired growth”. In sea urchins, specifically the Paracentrotus lividus, AzM modifies the cytoskeleton assembly at high concentrations and can alter the deposition of the skeleton of the larva at low concentrations. In mice, AzM causes weight loss, inhibits brain cholinesterase (ChE) and lowers the food consumption of the mice. A decrease of 45-50% of brain ChE is lethal in mice. Also in earthworms and rats, AzM decreases AChE activity.

In order to prevent stretching it too long, you may take a look at the following animal studies and their references:

- Zebrafish
- Amphipod Hyalella curvispina, the earthworm Eisenia Andrei
- Tilapia Oreochromis mossambicus
- Frog Pseudacris regilla and salamander Ambystoma gracile
- Toad Rhinella arenarum
- Rainbow trout oncorhynchus mykiss
- Comparison between the toad Rhinella arenarum and the rainbow trout oncorhynchus mykiss
- Comparison between fish Mysidopsis bahia and Cyprinodon variegatus

== See also ==
- Azinphos-ethyl
- Colony collapse disorder
