= C13H11NO2 =

The molecular formula C_{13}H_{11}NO_{2} (molar mass: 213.232 g/mol, exact mass: 213.0790 u) may refer to:

- Fenamic acid, or fenamate
- Salicylanilide
