= Anthranilate N-malonyltransferase =

Identifiers
- EC no.: 2.3.1.113
- CAS no.: 94489-98-2

Databases
- IntEnz: IntEnz view
- BRENDA: BRENDA entry
- ExPASy: NiceZyme view
- KEGG: KEGG entry
- MetaCyc: metabolic pathway
- PRIAM: profile
- PDB structures: RCSB PDB PDBe PDBsum
- Gene Ontology: AmiGO / QuickGO
Search
- PMC: articles
- PubMed: articles
- NCBI: proteins

Anthranilate N-malonyltransferase (EC 2.3.1.113) is an enzyme that catalyzes the chemical reaction

anthranilic acid
+
malonyl-CoA
N-malonylanthranilic acid
+ coenzyme A

The two substrates of this enzyme characterised from peanut are anthranilic acid and malonyl-CoA. Its products are N-malonylanthranilic acid and coenzyme A.

This enzyme belongs to the family of transferases, specifically those acyltransferases transferring groups other than aminoacyl groups. The systematic name of this enzyme class is malonyl-CoA:anthranilate N-malonyltransferase.
