= C17H19N3O =

The molecular formula C_{17}H_{19}N_{3}O (molar mass: 281.35 g/mol) may refer to:

- Ofornine
- Phentolamine, a reversible nonselective Alpha-adrenergic antagonist
- Piberaline, a psychoactive drug
- Lysergic acid methylamide
