= 2-chlorobenzoate 1,2-dioxygenase =

Class of enzymes

Identifiers
- EC no.: 1.14.12.13
- CAS no.: 125268-83-9

Databases
- IntEnz: IntEnz view
- BRENDA: BRENDA entry
- ExPASy: NiceZyme view
- KEGG: KEGG entry
- MetaCyc: metabolic pathway
- PRIAM: profile
- PDB structures: RCSB PDB PDBe PDBsum
- Gene Ontology: AmiGO / QuickGO
Search
- PMC: articles
- PubMed: articles
- NCBI: proteins

2-chlorobenzoate 1,2-dioxygenase (EC 1.14.12.13) is an enzyme from the bacterium Burkholderia cepacia that catalyzes the chemical reaction

2-Chlorobenzoic acid
+ NADH
O_{2}
CO_{2}
Catechol
+ NAD^{+} + Cl^{−}

The four substrates of this enzyme are 2-chlorobenzoic acid, reduced nicotinamide adenine dinucleotide (NADH), oxygen and a proton. Its products are catechol, carbon dioxide, oxidised NAD^{+}, and a chloride ion.

This enzyme is an oxidoreductase that uses molecular oxygen as oxidant and incorporates both its atoms into the starting material. The systematic name of its class is 2-chlorobenzoate,NADH:oxygen oxidoreductase (1,2-hydroxylating, dechlorinating, decarboxylating). This enzyme is also called 2-halobenzoate 1,2-dioxygenase. It can oxidise other 2-halo substituted benzoic acids.
