= Aminobenzamide =

Aminobenzamide may refer to:

- Anthranilamide (2-aminobenzamide)
- 3-Aminobenzamide
- 4-Aminobenzamide
