= Ofornine =

Antihypertensive drug

Clinical data
- Other names: Win 48049

Identifiers
- IUPAC name: 1-Piperidinyl(2-(4-pyridinylamino)phenyl)methanone
- CAS Number: 87784-12-1
- PubChem CID: 55754
- ChemSpider: 50349
- UNII: WK1LBP1F3L
- KEGG: D05234
- ChEMBL: ChEMBL2105194
- CompTox Dashboard (EPA): DTXSID60236626
- ECHA InfoCard: 100.081.195

Chemical and physical data
- Formula: C_{17}H_{19}N_{3}O
- Molar mass: 281.359 g·mol^{−1}
- 3D model (JSmol): Interactive image
- SMILES: C1CCN(CC1)C(=O)C2=CC=CC=C2NC3=CC=NC=C3
- InChI: InChI=1S/C17H19N3O/c21-17(20-12-4-1-5-13-20)15-6-2-3-7-16(15)19-14-8-10-18-11-9-14/h2-3,6-11H,1,4-5,12-13H2,(H,18,19); Key:YMODINPJYNHPTM-UHFFFAOYSA-N

Ofornine is a synthetic compound investigated primarily for its antihypertensive properties. It functions as a vasodilator and exhibits presynaptic adrenolytic activity, with evidence suggesting involvement of dopaminergic mechanisms in its pharmacological effects.

A number of structural analogs have been prepared with similar activity.

== Chemistry ==
Ofornine contains a pyridine moiety, or more specifically a fampridine or anthranilamide (c.f. fenamate).

=== Synthesis ===
Synthesis: Patent:

Reaction between 4-chloropyridine [626-61-9] HCl: [7379-35-3] (1) and anthranilic acid [118-92-3] (2) gives 2-(4-pyridylamino)benzoic acid [34861-30-8] (3). Halogenation with thionyl chloride gave 2-(4-pyridinylamino)-benzoyl chloride [89989-83-3] (4). Amide formation with piperidine [110-89-4] (5) completed the synthesis of Ofornine (6).
