= 2,3-dihydroxyindole 2,3-dioxygenase =

Class of enzymes

Identifiers
- EC no.: 1.13.11.23
- CAS no.: 37256-62-5

Databases
- IntEnz: IntEnz view
- BRENDA: BRENDA entry
- ExPASy: NiceZyme view
- KEGG: KEGG entry
- MetaCyc: metabolic pathway
- PRIAM: profile
- PDB structures: RCSB PDB PDBe PDBsum
- Gene Ontology: AmiGO / QuickGO
Search
- PMC: articles
- PubMed: articles
- NCBI: proteins

2,3-dihydroxyindole 2,3-dioxygenase (EC 1.13.11.23) is an enzyme that catalyzes the chemical reaction

2,3-dihydroxyindole
O_{2}
CO_{2}
anthranilic acid

The two substrates of this enzyme are 2,3-dihydroxyindole and oxygen. Its two products are anthranilic acid and carbon dioxide.

This enzyme belongs to the family of oxidoreductases, specifically those acting on single donors with O_{2} as oxidant and incorporation of two atoms of oxygen into the substrate (oxygenases). The oxygen incorporated need not be derived from O_{2}. The systematic name of this enzyme class is 2,3-dihydroxyindole:oxygen 2,3-oxidoreductase (decyclizing). This enzyme participates in tryptophan metabolism.
