= 2-Diphenylphosphinobenzoic acid =

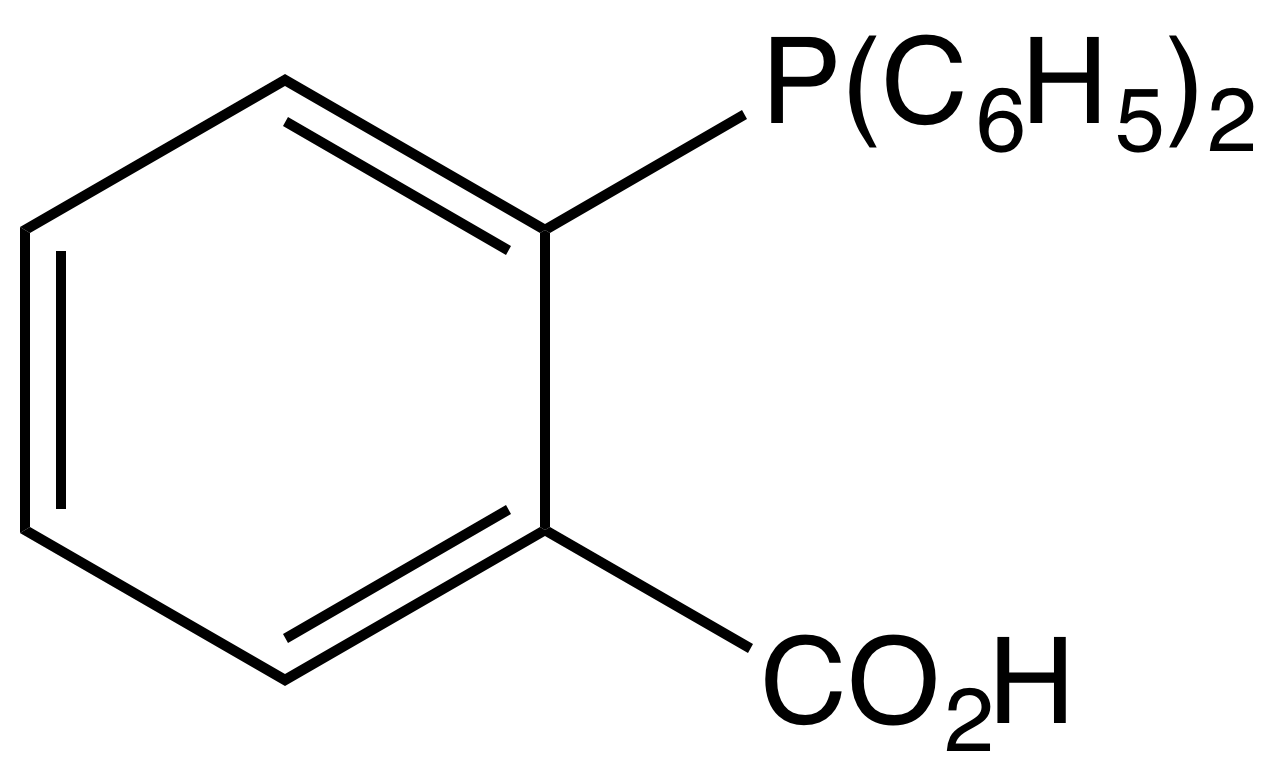

Names
- Preferred IUPAC name 2-(Diphenylphosphanyl)benzoic acid

Identifiers
CAS Number	17261-28-8
3D model (JSmol)	Interactive image
ChEMBL	ChEMBL361405
ChemSpider	78496
ECHA InfoCard	100.037.524
EC Number	241-293-7
PubChem CID	87021
UNII	5TH63M8SLV
CompTox Dashboard (EPA)	DTXSID4066179
- InChI: InChI=1S/C19H15O2P/c20-19(21)17-13-7-8-14-18(17)22(15-9-3-1-4-10-15)16-11-5-2-6-12-16/h1-14H,(H,20,21) Key: UYRPRYSDOVYCOU-UHFFFAOYSA-N
- SMILES: C1=CC=C(C=C1)P(C2=CC=CC=C2)C3=CC=CC=C3C(=O)O

Properties
Chemical formula	C_{19}H_{15}O_{2}P
Molar mass	306.301 g·mol^{−1}
Appearance	white solid
Density	1.278 g/cm^{3}
Melting point	174–181 °C (345–358 °F; 447–454 K)
Solubility in water	alcohols, acetone, CH_{2}Cl_{2}

Hazards
- GHS labelling
Pictograms	(GHS07: Exclamation mark)
Signal word	Warning
Hazard statements	H315, H319, H332, H335
Precautionary statements	P261, P264, P271, P280, P302+P352, P304+P312, P304+P340, P305+P351+P338, P312, P321, P332+P313, P337+P313, P362, P403+P233, P405, P501
- Except where otherwise noted, data are given for materials in their standard state (at 25 °C [77 °F], 100 kPa). Infobox references

2-Diphenylphosphinobenzoic acid is an organophosphorus compound with the formula (C_{6}H_{5})_{2}PC_{6}H_{4}CO_{2}H. It is a white solid that dissolves in polar organic solvents. The ligand is a component of catalysts used for the Shell higher olefin process. It is prepared by the reaction of sodium diphenylphosphide with the sodium salt of 2-chlorobenzoic acid.

== Related compounds ==
- Diphenylphosphinobenzaldehyde
