= 3,5-Xylidine =

Names
- Preferred IUPAC name 3,5-Dimethylaniline

Identifiers
| CAS Number | 108-69-0 |
| 3D model (JSmol) | Interactive image |
| ChEMBL | ChEMBL1603782 |
| ChemSpider | 21106578 |
| ECHA InfoCard | 100.003.280 |
| EC Number | 215-091-4 |
| MeSH | C514328 |
| PubChem CID | 7949 |
| RTECS number | ZE9625000 |
| UNII | 1418BR6T2H |
| UN number | 0077 1711 |
| CompTox Dashboard (EPA) | DTXSID8026309 |
- InChI: InChI=1S/C8H11N/c1-6-3-7(2)5-8(9)4-6/h3-5H,9H2,1-2H3 Key: MKARNSWMMBGSHX-UHFFFAOYSA-N
- SMILES: Cc1cc(cc(c1)N)C

Properties
| Chemical formula | C_{8}H_{11}N |
| Molar mass | 121.183 g·mol^{−1} |
| Appearance | colorless oil |
| Density | 0.9704 g/cm^{3} |
| Melting point | 9.8–10.0 °C (49.6–50.0 °F; 282.9–283.1 K) |
| Boiling point | 218 °C (424 °F; 491 K) |

Hazards
- GHS labelling
| Pictograms | (GHS06: Toxic) (GHS08: Health hazard) (GHS09: Environmental hazard) |
| Signal word | Danger |
| Hazard statements | H301, H311, H331, H373, H411 |
| Precautionary statements | P260, P264, P270, P271, P273, P280, P301+P310, P302+P352, P304+P340, P311, P312, P314, P321, P322, P330, P361, P363, P391, P403+P233, P405, P501 |
| Flash point | 103 °C (217 °F; 376 K) |
- Except where otherwise noted, data are given for materials in their standard state (at 25 °C [77 °F], 100 kPa). Infobox references

3,5-Xylidine is the organic compound with the formula C_{6}H_{3}(CH_{3})_{2}NH_{2}. It is one of several isomeric xylidines. It is a colorless viscous liquid. It is used in the production of the dye Pigment Red 149.

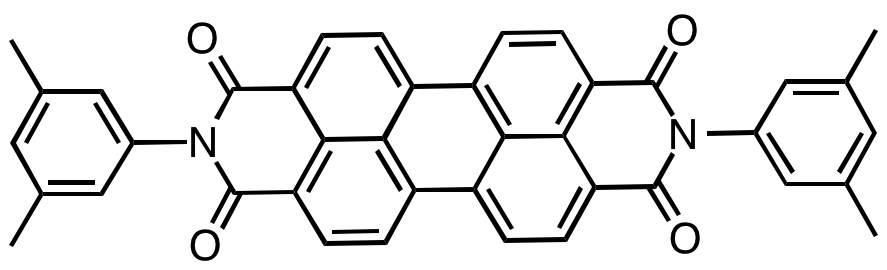
Chemical structure of Pigment Red 149

== Production ==
3,5-Xylidine is produced industrially by amination of the xylenol using ammonia and alumina catalyst.
