= Azinphos-ethyl =

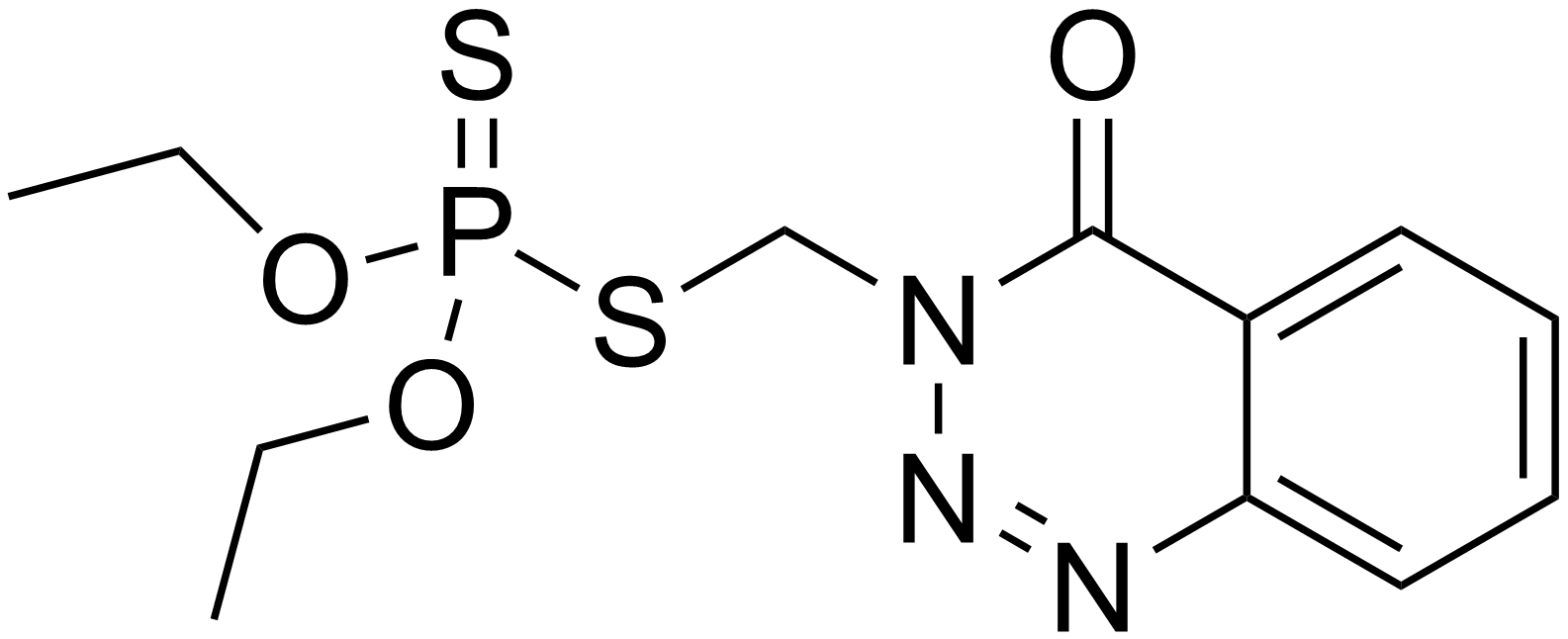

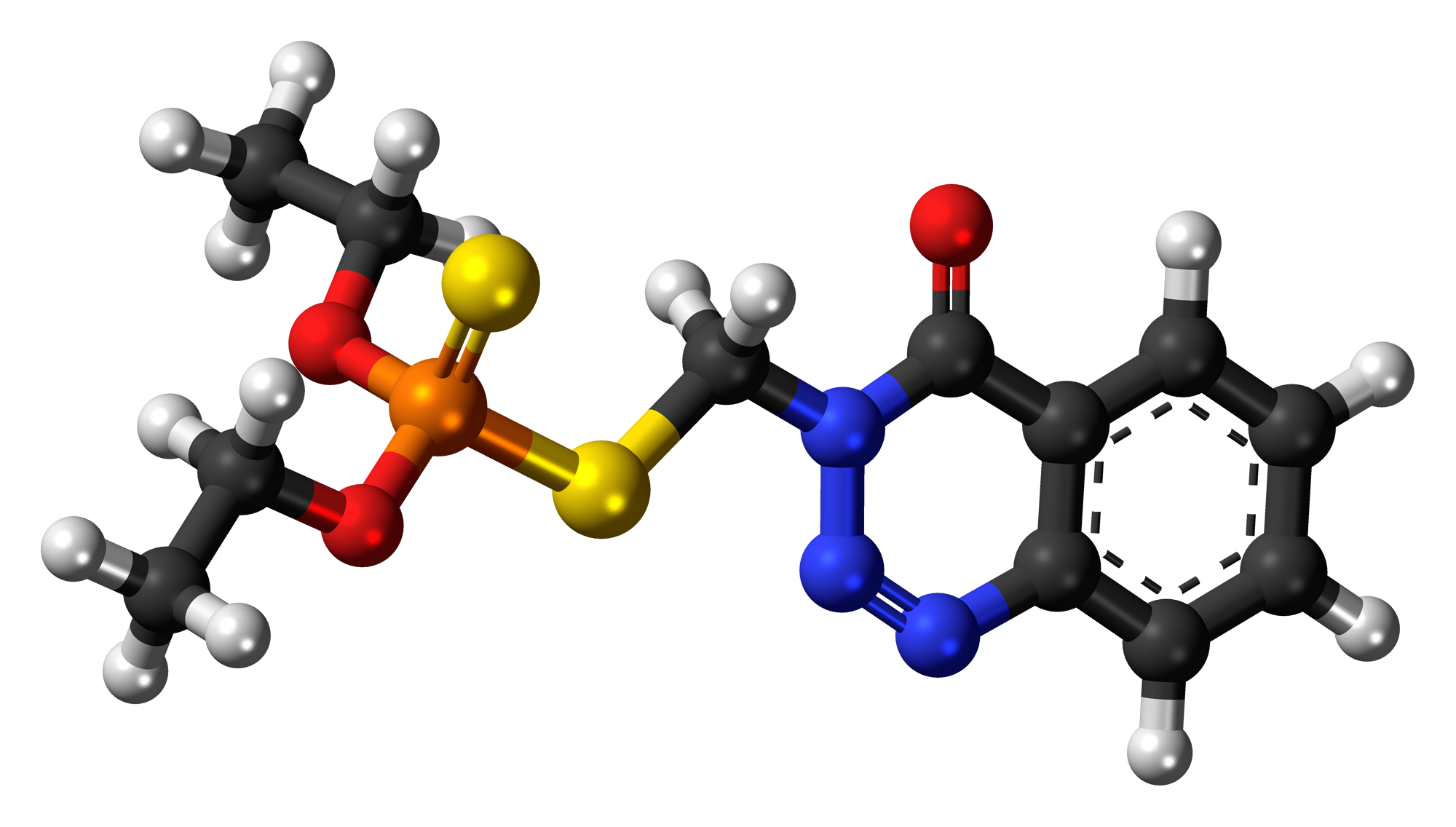

Names
- Preferred IUPAC name O,O-Diethyl S-[(4-oxo-1,2,3-benzotriazin-3(4H)-yl)methyl] phosphorodithioate
- Other names O,O-Diethyl S-[(4-oxobenzo[d][1,2,3]triazin-3(4H)-yl)methyl] phosphorodithioate Gusathion; Ethyl azinphos

Identifiers
CAS Number	2642-71-9
3D model (JSmol)	Interactive image; Interactive image
ChEBI	CHEBI:38587
ChemSpider	16576
ECHA InfoCard	100.018.316
KEGG	C18644
PubChem CID	17531
RTECS number	TD8400000
UNII	EA96NYT5J5
CompTox Dashboard (EPA)	DTXSID5037498
- InChI: InChI=1S/C12H16N3O3PS2/c1-3-17-19(20,18-4-2)21-9-15-12(16)10-7-5-6-8-11(10)13-14-15/h5-8H,3-4,9H2,1-2H3 Key: RQVGAIADHNPSME-UHFFFAOYSA-N; InChI=1/C12H16N3O3PS2/c1-3-17-19(20,18-4-2)21-9-15-12(16)10-7-5-6-8-11(10)13-14-15/h5-8H,3-4,9H2,1-2H3 Key: RQVGAIADHNPSME-UHFFFAOYAF
- SMILES: CCOP(=S)(OCC)SCN1C(=O)C2=CC=CC=C2N=N1; S=P(OCC)(OCC)SCN1\N=N/c2ccccc2C1=O

Properties
Chemical formula	C_{12}H_{16}N_{3}O_{3}PS_{2}
Molar mass	345.37 g·mol^{−1}
Appearance	Colorless crystals
Melting point	53 °C (127 °F; 326 K)

Hazards
- Lethal dose or concentration (LD, LC)
LD_{50} (median dose)	17.5 mg/kg (oral, rat)
- Except where otherwise noted, data are given for materials in their standard state (at 25 °C [77 °F], 100 kPa). verify (what is ?) Infobox references

Azinphos-ethyl (also spelled azinophos-ethyl) was a broad-spectrum organophosphate insecticide.

== Regulation ==
It is very toxic to mammals with a World Health Organization hazard classification as class IB, highly hazardous. It is classified as an extremely hazardous substance in the United States as defined in Section 302 of the U.S. Emergency Planning and Community Right-to-Know Act (42 U.S.C. 11002), and is subject to strict reporting requirements by facilities which produce, store, or use it in significant quantities.

== See also ==
- Azinphos-methyl
