= 3,4-Xylidine =

Names
- Preferred IUPAC name 3,4-Dimethylaniline
- Other names 3,4-Dimethylphenylamine; 3,4-Dimethylbenzenamine

Identifiers
CAS Number	95-64-7
3D model (JSmol)	Interactive image
ChEBI	CHEBI:39901
ChemSpider	6978
ECHA InfoCard	100.002.217
PubChem CID	7248
UNII	R27I33AIDT
CompTox Dashboard (EPA)	DTXSID3026308
- InChI: InChI=1S/C8H11N/c1-6-3-4-8(9)5-7(6)2/h3-5H,9H2,1-2H3 Key: DOLQYFPDPKPQSS-UHFFFAOYSA-N
- SMILES: Cc1ccc(N)cc1C

Properties
Chemical formula	C_{8}H_{11}N
Molar mass	121.183 g·mol^{−1}
Melting point	51.0 °C (123.8 °F; 324.1 K)
Boiling point	226.0 °C (438.8 °F; 499.1 K)
- Except where otherwise noted, data are given for materials in their standard state (at 25 °C [77 °F], 100 kPa). verify (what is ?) Infobox references

3,4-Xylidine is an organic compound with the formula C_{6}H_{3}(CH_{3})_{2}NH_{2}. It is one of several isomeric xylidines. It is a colorless solid. It is a precursor for the production of riboflavin (vitamin B_{2}).

The compound is prepared by two routes: hydrogenation of (2-chloromethyl)-4-nitrotoluene and reaction of the bromoxylene with ammonia.

== Safety ==
Like other xylidines, 3,4-xylidine has modest toxicity with an LD_{50} of 812 mg/kg when administered orally to rats.

In 2003, more than twenty US Army troops were allegedly exposed to 3,4-xylidine during the occupation of Iraq, leading to a number of health complaints.
