= Chlorobenzoic acid =

Chlorobenzoic acid may refer to:

- 2-Chlorobenzoic acid
- 3-Chlorobenzoic acid
- 4-Chlorobenzoic acid
