= Pigment Red 149 =

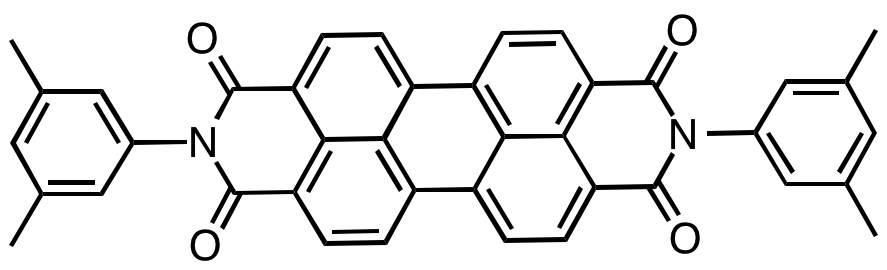

Names
- Preferred IUPAC name 2,9-Bis(2,5-dimethylphenyl)anthra[2,1,9-def:6,5,10-d′e′f′]diisoquinoline-1,3,8,10(2H,9H)-tetrone

Identifiers
CAS Number	4948-15-6
3D model (JSmol)	Interactive image
ChemSpider	56322
ECHA InfoCard	100.023.264
EC Number	225-590-9
PubChem CID	62555
UNII	ZZA8XO3AWA
CompTox Dashboard (EPA)	DTXSID4052130
- InChI: InChI=1S/C40H26N2O4/c1-19-13-20(2)16-23(15-19)41-37(43)29-9-5-25-27-7-11-31-36-32(40(46)42(39(31)45)24-17-21(3)14-22(4)18-24)12-8-28(34(27)36)26-6-10-30(38(41)44)35(29)33(25)26/h5-18H,1-4H3 Key: FDXVHZCFTCIKDD-UHFFFAOYSA-N; InChI=1/C40H26N2O4/c1-19-13-20(2)16-23(15-19)41-37(43)29-9-5-25-27-7-11-31-36-32(40(46)42(39(31)45)24-17-21(3)14-22(4)18-24)12-8-28(34(27)36)26-6-10-30(38(41)44)35(29)33(25)26/h5-18H,1-4H3 Key: FDXVHZCFTCIKDD-UHFFFAOYAH
- SMILES: Cc1cc(cc(c1)N2C(=O)c3ccc4c5ccc6c7c5c(ccc7C(=O)N(C6=O)c8cc(cc(c8)C)C)c9c4c3c(cc9)C2=O)C

Properties
Chemical formula	C_{40}H_{26}N_{2}O_{4}
Molar mass	598.65
- Except where otherwise noted, data are given for materials in their standard state (at 25 °C [77 °F], 100 kPa). Infobox references

Pigment Red 149 is an organic compound that is used as a pigment. Structurally, it is a derivative of perylene, although it is produced from perylenetetracarboxylic dianhydride by derivatization with 3,5-dimethylaniline.
