= Tibric acid =

Names
- Preferred IUPAC name 2-Chloro-5-[(3R,5S)-3,5-dimethylpiperidine-1-sulfonyl]benzoic acid

Identifiers
CAS Number	37087-94-8
3D model (JSmol)	Interactive image
ChEMBL	ChEMBL2104748
ChemSpider	29975
ECHA InfoCard	100.048.479
EC Number	253-344-0
KEGG	D06133
PubChem CID	32335
UNII	LK312SQ24Z
CompTox Dashboard (EPA)	DTXSID1020277
- InChI: InChI=1S/C14H18ClNO4S/c1-9-5-10(2)8-16(7-9)21(19,20)11-3-4-13(15)12(6-11)14(17)18/h3-4,6,9-10H,5,7-8H2,1-2H3,(H,17,18)/t9-,10+ Key: IFXSWTIWFGIXQO-AOOOYVTPSA-N
- SMILES: C[C@@H]1C[C@@H](CN(C1)S(=O)(=O)C2=CC(=C(C=C2)Cl)C(=O)O)C

Properties
Chemical formula	C_{14}H_{18}ClNO_{4}S
Molar mass	331.81 g·mol^{−1}
- Except where otherwise noted, data are given for materials in their standard state (at 25 °C [77 °F], 100 kPa). Infobox references

Tibric acid is a sulfamylbenzoic acid that acts as a hypolipidemic agent. Although it was found to be more powerful than clofibrate in lowering lipid levels, it was found to cause liver cancer in mice and rats, and so was not introduced as a human drug. In rats it causes an increase in peroxisomes, and liver enlargement, and then liver cancer. However the peroxisome changes do not occur in humans, and it is not likely to cause liver cancer in humans.

== Synthesis ==
Tibric acid can be made in a multi-step process. Firstly 2-chlorobenzoic acid is reacted with chlorosulfonic acid to add a chlorosulfonate group in the 5- position. This reacts with 3,5-dimethylpiperidine to yield tibric acid.
