= 2,3-Xylidine =

Names
- Preferred IUPAC name 2,3-Dimethylaniline

Identifiers
CAS Number	87-59-2
3D model (JSmol)	Interactive image
ChEMBL	ChEMBL1578983
ChemSpider	13840647
ECHA InfoCard	100.001.596
EC Number	201-755-0
PubChem CID	6893
RTECS number	ZE8750000
UNII	ZD450ABI9X
UN number	1711
CompTox Dashboard (EPA)	DTXSID3026304
- InChI: InChI=1S/C8H11N/c1-6-4-3-5-8(9)7(6)2/h3-5H,9H2,1-2H3 Key: VVAKEQGKZNKUSU-UHFFFAOYSA-N
- SMILES: Cc1cccc(c1C)N

Properties
Chemical formula	C_{8}H_{11}N
Molar mass	121.183 g·mol^{−1}
Appearance	colorless liquid
Melting point	3.5 °C (38.3 °F; 276.6 K)
Boiling point	222 °C (432 °F; 495 K)

Hazards
- GHS labelling
Pictograms	(GHS06: Toxic) (GHS08: Health hazard) (GHS09: Environmental hazard)
Signal word	Warning
Hazard statements	H301, H311, H331, H373, H411
Precautionary statements	P260, P264, P270, P271, P273, P280, P301+P310, P302+P352, P304+P340, P311, P312, P314, P321, P322, P330, P361, P363, P391, P403+P233, P405, P501
Flash point	97 °C (207 °F; 370 K)
- Except where otherwise noted, data are given for materials in their standard state (at 25 °C [77 °F], 100 kPa). Infobox references

2,3-Xylidine is the organic compound with the formula C_{6}H_{3}(CH_{3})_{2}NH_{2}. it is one of several isomeric xylidines. It is a colorless viscous liquid. The compound is used in the production of the drug mefenamic acid and the herbicide xylachlor.
