= 2-Chlorobenzoic acid =

Names
- Preferred IUPAC name 2-Chlorobenzoic acid
- Other names o-Chlorobenzoic acid

Identifiers
CAS Number	118-91-2
3D model (JSmol)	Interactive image
ChEBI	CHEBI:30793
ChEMBL	ChEMBL115243
ChemSpider	8071
ECHA InfoCard	100.003.897
KEGG	C02357
PubChem CID	8374
UNII	8P0867193V
CompTox Dashboard (EPA)	DTXSID4024771
- InChI: InChI=1S/C7H5ClO2/c8-6-4-2-1-3-5(6)7(9)10/h1-4H,(H,9,10) Key: IKCLCGXPQILATA-UHFFFAOYSA-N; InChI=1/C7H5ClO2/c8-6-4-2-1-3-5(6)7(9)10/h1-4H,(H,9,10) Key: IKCLCGXPQILATA-UHFFFAOYAI
- SMILES: O=C(O)c1ccccc1Cl

Properties
Chemical formula	C_{7}H_{5}ClO_{2}
Molar mass	156.57 g·mol^{−1}
Appearance	white solid
Melting point	142 °C (288 °F; 415 K)
Boiling point	285 °C (545 °F; 558 K)
log P	2.039
Acidity (pK_{a})	2.89
Magnetic susceptibility (χ)	−83.56·10^{−6} cm^{3}/mol

Hazards
Safety data sheet (SDS)	Oxford MSDS
- Except where otherwise noted, data are given for materials in their standard state (at 25 °C [77 °F], 100 kPa). verify (what is ?) Infobox references

2-Chlorobenzoic acid is an organic compound with the formula ClC_{6}H_{4}CO_{2}H. It is one of three isomeric chlorobenzoic acids, the one that is the strongest acid. This white solid is used as a precursor to a variety of drugs, food additives, and dyes.

== Synthesis and reactions ==
It is prepared by the oxidation of 2-chlorotoluene. The laboratory scale reaction employs potassium permanganate. Alternatively it arises by the hydrolysis of α,α,α-trichloro-2-toluene.

The chloride is readily replaced by ammonia to 2-aminobenzoic acid. Similarly, the chloride is displaced by diphenylphosphide, leading to 2-diphenylphosphinobenzoic acid.

At elevated temperature it decarboxylates.

== Applications ==
Known uses include in the synthesis of: Mefenamic acid, Amsacrine, Eproxindine, Diclofenac, Thiethylperazine, Meclofenamic acid, Araprofen, Lucanthone (& thus also ROC 325), Tibric acid, Enfenamic acid, Chlorprothixene (actually 2-iodobenzoic acid according to cited patent). Flufenamic acid
