= Isatoic anhydride =

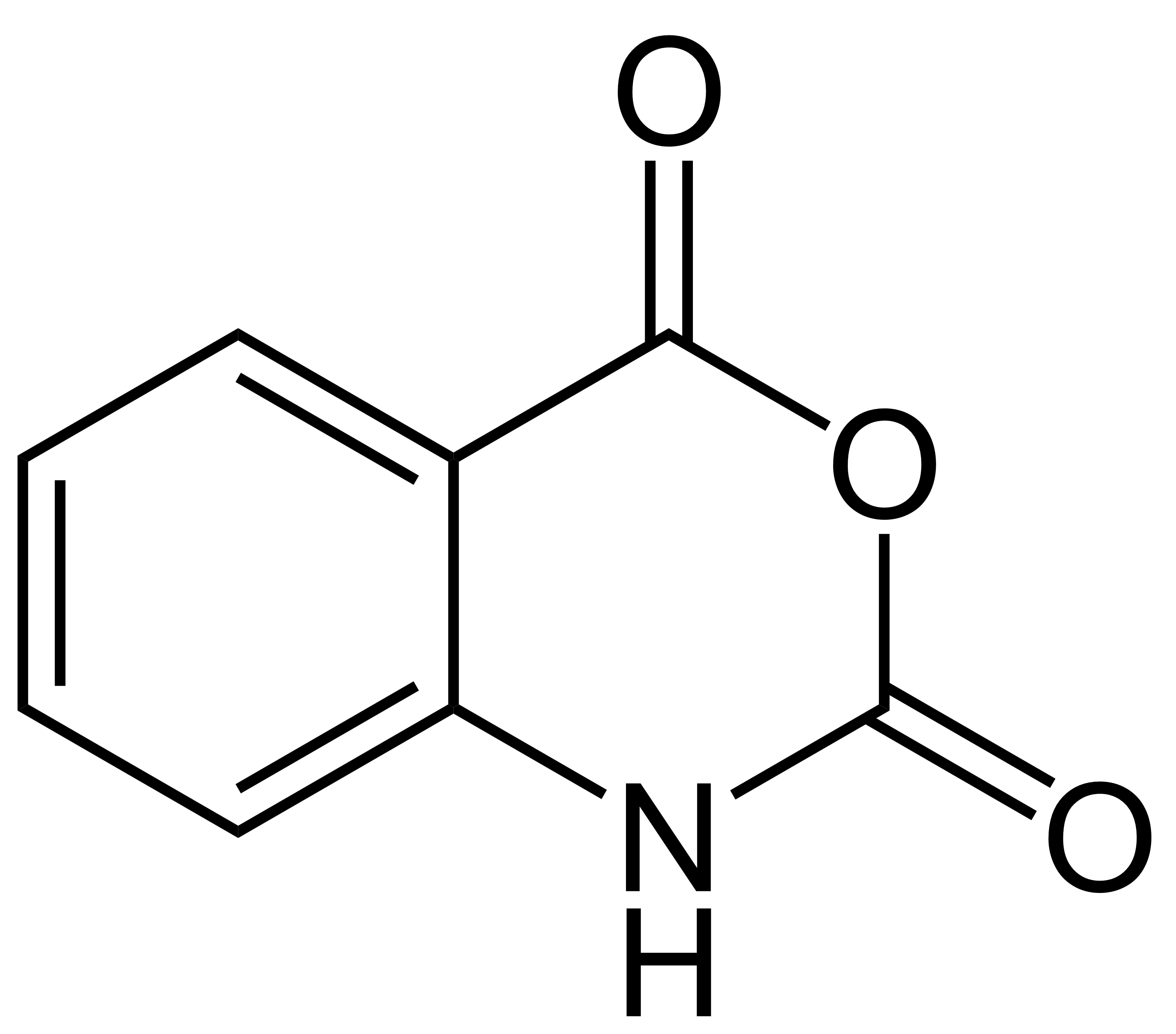

Names
- Preferred IUPAC name 2H-3,1-Benzoxazine-2,4(1H)-dione

Identifiers
CAS Number	118-48-9
3D model (JSmol)	Interactive image
ChEMBL	ChEMBL346059
ChemSpider	8056
DrugBank	DB11593
ECHA InfoCard	100.003.869
EC Number	204-255-0
PubChem CID	8359
UNII	R8TFA74Y4U
CompTox Dashboard (EPA)	DTXSID6026955
- InChI: InChI=1S/C8H5NO3/c10-7-5-3-1-2-4-6(5)9-8(11)12-7/h1-4H,(H,9,11) Key: TXJUTRJFNRYTHH-UHFFFAOYSA-N
- SMILES: C1=CC=C2C(=C1)C(=O)OC(=O)N2

Properties
Chemical formula	C_{8}H_{5}NO_{3}
Molar mass	163.132 g·mol^{−1}
Appearance	white solid
Melting point	243 °C (469 °F; 516 K)

Hazards
- GHS labelling
Pictograms	(GHS07: Exclamation mark)
Signal word	Warning
Hazard statements	H317, H319
Precautionary statements	P261, P264+P265, P272, P280, P302+P352, P305+P351+P338, P321, P333+P317, P337+P317, P362+P364, P501
- Except where otherwise noted, data are given for materials in their standard state (at 25 °C [77 °F], 100 kPa). Infobox references

Isatoic anhydride is an organic compound derived from anthranilic acid. A white solid, it is prepared by reaction of anthranilic acid with phosgene.

== Reactions ==
Hydrolysis gives carbon dioxide and anthranilic acid. Alcoholysis proceeds similarly, affording the ester:

C_{6}H_{4}C_{2}O_{3}NH + ROH → C_{6}H_{4}(CO_{2}R)(NH_{2}) + CO_{2}

Amines also effect ring-opening. Active methylene compounds and carbanions replace oxygen giving hydroxyquinolinone derivatives. Deprotonation followed by alkylation gives the N-substituted derivatives. Sodium azide gives the benzimidazolone via the isocyanate. Isatoic anhydride is used as a blowing agent in the polymer industry, an application that exploits its tendency to release CO_{2}.

== Uses ==
Isatoic anhydride has been used as a precursor for the synthesis of methaqualone and related 4-quinazolinone-based pharmaceutical drugs, including:

1. Antrafenine
2. Atolide
3. Cloperidone
4. Diproqualone
5. Pelanserin
6. Nicafenine
7. Molinazone
8. SJ-733
9. Tioperidone
10. Tranilast (actually made from acetanthranil)
11. SGB 1534
12. U-29409 [31785-60-1]
