= Thiethylperazine =

Chemical compound

Clinical data
- Trade names: Torecan, Norzine
- AHFS/Drugs.com: Micromedex Detailed Consumer Information
- ATC code: R06AD03 (WHO)

Pharmacokinetic data
- Protein binding: 60%

Identifiers
- IUPAC name: 2-(Ethylthio)-10-[3-(4-methylpiperazin-1-yl)propyl]-10H-phenothiazine
- CAS Number: 1420-55-9
- PubChem CID: 5440
- IUPHAR/BPS: 7306
- DrugBank: DB00372
- ChemSpider: 5245
- UNII: 8ETK1WAF6R
- KEGG: D02354
- ChEBI: CHEBI:9544
- ChEMBL: ChEMBL1378
- CompTox Dashboard (EPA): DTXSID1023651
- ECHA InfoCard: 100.014.381

Chemical and physical data
- Formula: C_{22}H_{29}N_{3}S_{2}
- Molar mass: 399.62 g·mol^{−1}
- 3D model (JSmol): Interactive image
- SMILES: S(c2cc1N(c3c(Sc1cc2)cccc3)CCCN4CCN(C)CC4)CC
- InChI: InChI=1S/C22H29N3S2/c1-3-26-18-9-10-22-20(17-18)25(19-7-4-5-8-21(19)27-22)12-6-11-24-15-13-23(2)14-16-24/h4-5,7-10,17H,3,6,11-16H2,1-2H3; Key:XCTYLCDETUVOIP-UHFFFAOYSA-N

Thiethylperazine (Torecan, Norzine) is an antiemetic of the phenothiazine class. It is an antagonist of dopamine receptors (DRD1, DRD2, DRD4) as well as of 5-HT_{2A}, 5-HT_{2C} receptors, mAChRs (1 through 5), α_{1} adrenergic receptor and H_{1} receptor.

Thiethylperazine activates the transport protein ABCC1 that clears beta-amyloid from brains of mice.

== Pharmacokinetics ==
=== Distribution ===
Thiethylperazine is highly lipofilic and it binds with membranes and serum proteins (over 85%). It accumulates in organs with high blood flow and penetrates the placenta. It cannot be removed with dialysis.

=== Metabolism ===
It is mainly metabolized in the liver and only 3% is eliminated unchanged. Thiethylperazine's half-life is 12 h.

== Teratogenicity ==
In toxic doses above the terapeutic window, it increases the rate of cleft palate occurrence.

== Antipsychotic activity ==
Theithylperazine may possess antipsychotic activity due to the antagonism of 5-HT_{2} and D_{2} receptors. It can cause extrapyramidal symptoms. Nevertheless, it was never marketed as an antipsychotic.

One cause of acute dystonia occurred in a 19-year-old male patient after discontinuation of this drug.

== Overdose ==
Signs of acute thiethylperazine overdose include extrapyramidal symptoms, confusion, convulsions, respiratory depression, and hypotension.

== Synthesis ==
One synthesis of thiethylperazine begins with a Goldberg reaction between 3-(ethylsulfanyl)aniline (1) and 2-chlorobenzoic acid (2) to give the diarylamine 3. The carboxyl in the anthranilic acid residue, having performed its activating function, is then thermolytically removed to form (4). Upon treatment with sulfur and iodine, we get predominantly the phenothiazine (5). The reaction may well be aided by the presence of the electron donating thioether at the para-position. Alkylation with 1-(γ-chloropropyl)-4-methylpiperazine (6) in the presence of sodamide affords thiethylperazine (7).

Synthesis of thiethylperazine
