= Fenamic acid =

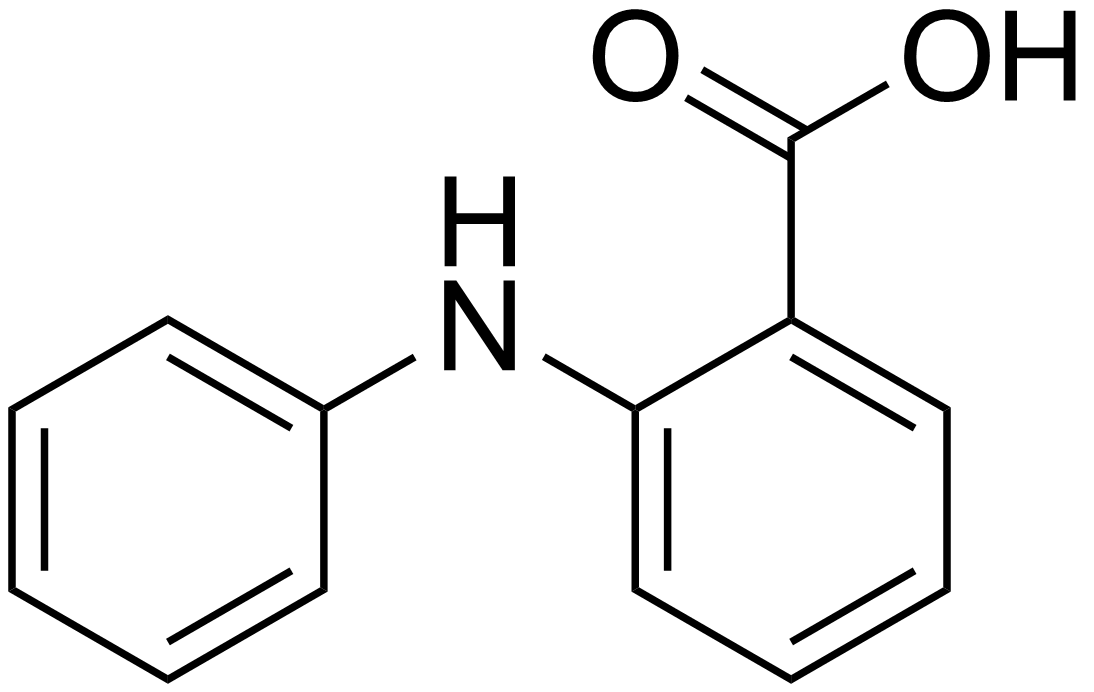

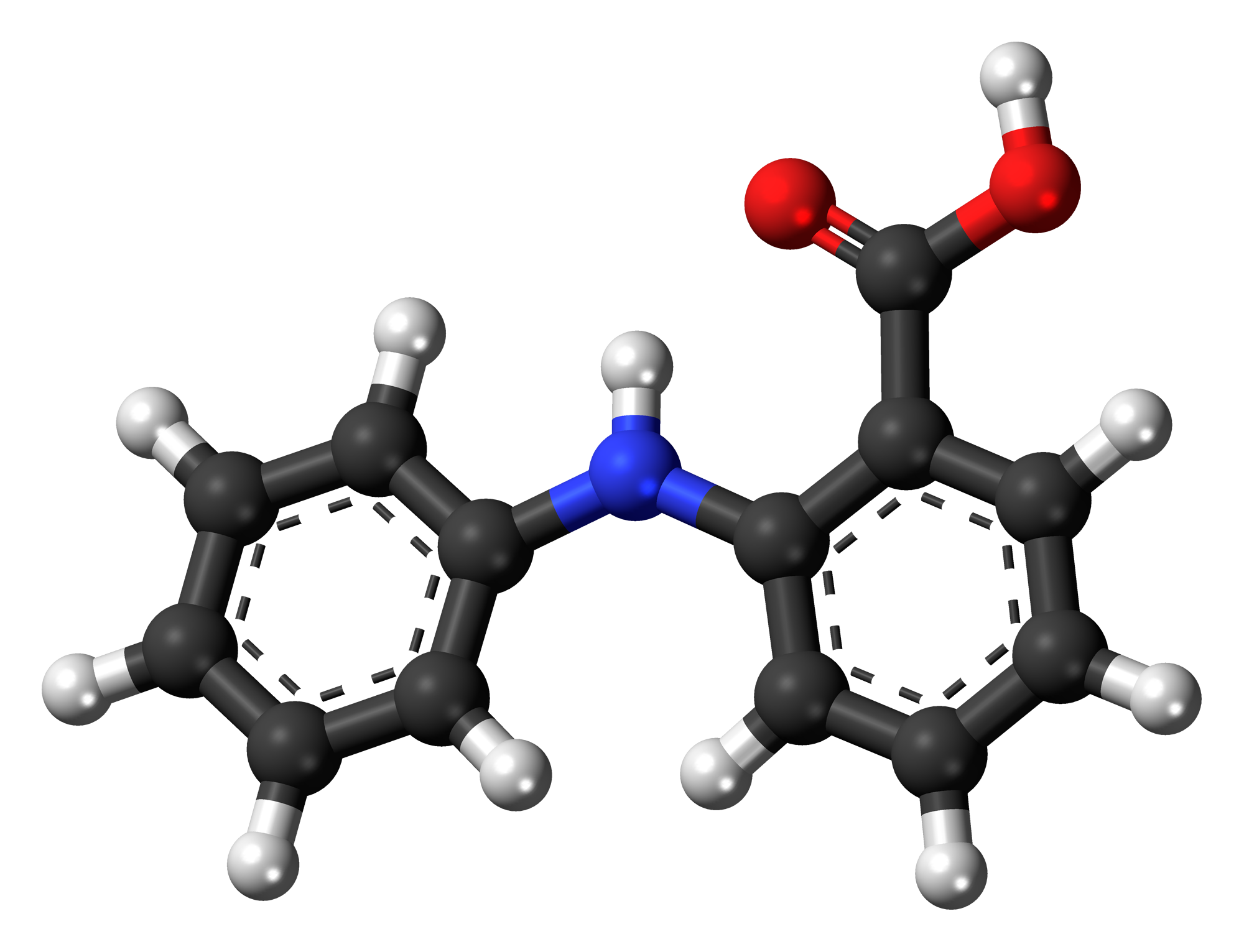

Names
- Preferred IUPAC name 2-Anilinobenzoic acid
- Other names N-phenylanthranilic acid

Identifiers
CAS Number	91-40-7
3D model (JSmol)	Interactive image
ChEBI	CHEBI:34756
ChEMBL	ChEMBL23832
ChemSpider	4233
ECHA InfoCard	100.001.879
IUPHAR/BPS	4182
PubChem CID	4386
UNII	952VN06WBB
CompTox Dashboard (EPA)	DTXSID6059025
- InChI: InChI=1S/C13H11NO2/c15-13(16)11-8-4-5-9-12(11)14-10-6-2-1-3-7-10/h1-9,14H,(H,15,16) Key: ZWJINEZUASEZBH-UHFFFAOYSA-N; InChI=1/C13H11NO2/c15-13(16)11-8-4-5-9-12(11)14-10-6-2-1-3-7-10/h1-9,14H,(H,15,16) Key: ZWJINEZUASEZBH-UHFFFAOYAQ
- SMILES: C1=CC=C(C=C1)NC2=CC=CC=C2C(=O)O

Properties
Chemical formula	C_{13}H_{11}NO_{2}
Molar mass	213.23 g/mol
- Except where otherwise noted, data are given for materials in their standard state (at 25 °C [77 °F], 100 kPa). verify (what is ?) Infobox references

Fenamic acid is an organic compound, which, especially in its ester form, is called fenamate. serves as a parent structure for several nonsteroidal anti-inflammatory drugs (NSAIDs), including mefenamic acid, tolfenamic acid, flufenamic acid, and meclofenamic acid. These drugs are commonly referred to as "anthranilic acid derivatives" or "fenamates" because fenamic acid is a derivative of anthranilic acid.

Fenamic acid can be synthesized from 2-chlorobenzoic acid and can be converted into acridone.
