= 2-Diphenylphosphinobenzaldehyde =

Names
- Preferred IUPAC name 2-(Diphenylphosphanyl)benzaldehyde

Identifiers
CAS Number	50777-76-9
3D model (JSmol)	Interactive image
ChemSpider	2035266
ECHA InfoCard	100.156.047
PubChem CID	2754316
UNII	5M9BQ2FEC8
CompTox Dashboard (EPA)	DTXSID50373019
- InChI: InChI=1S/C19H15OP/c20-15-16-9-7-8-14-19(16)21(17-10-3-1-4-11-17)18-12-5-2-6-13-18/h1-15H Key: DRCPJRZHAJMWOU-UHFFFAOYSA-N; InChI=1/C19H15OP/c20-15-16-9-7-8-14-19(16)21(17-10-3-1-4-11-17)18-12-5-2-6-13-18/h1-15H Key: DRCPJRZHAJMWOU-UHFFFAOYAH
- SMILES: C1=CC=C(C=C1)P(C2=CC=CC=C2)C3=CC=CC=C3C=O

Properties
Chemical formula	C_{19}H_{15}OP
Appearance	yellow solid
Melting point	118 to 119 °C (244 to 246 °F; 391 to 392 K)

Hazards
- GHS labelling
Pictograms	(GHS07: Exclamation mark)
Signal word	Warning
Hazard statements	H315, H319, H335
Precautionary statements	P261, P264, P264+P265, P271, P280, P302+P352, P304+P340, P305+P351+P338, P319, P321, P332+P317, P337+P317, P362+P364, P403+P233, P405, P501
- Except where otherwise noted, data are given for materials in their standard state (at 25 °C [77 °F], 100 kPa). Infobox references

2-Diphenylphosphinobenzaldehyde is a phosphine ligand with the formula (C_{6}H_{5})_{2}PC_{6}H_{4}CHO. It is a yellow solid that dissolves in common organic solvents.

== Synthesis and reactions ==
2-Diphenylphosphinobenzaldehyde was first prepared by the reaction of chlorodiphenylphosphine with the Grignard reagent derived from the protected 2-bromobenzaldehyde, followed by deprotection. It can also be derived from (2-lithiophenyl)diphenylphosphine.

The compound condenses with a variety of amines to give phosphine-imine and phosphine-amine ligands.
