= 2,5-Xylidine =

Names
- Preferred IUPAC name 2,5-Dimethylaniline
- Other names 2,5-Dimethylphenylamine, 2,5-Dimethylbenzenamine

Identifiers
CAS Number	95-78-3
3D model (JSmol)	Interactive image
ChEBI	CHEBI:518305
ChEMBL	ChEMBL249120
ChemSpider	6989
DrugBank	DB02163
ECHA InfoCard	100.002.229
PubChem CID	7259
UNII	XWK0W8DA04
CompTox Dashboard (EPA)	DTXSID3026306
- InChI: InChI=1S/C8H11N/c1-6-3-4-7(2)8(9)5-6/h3-5H,9H2,1-2H3 Key: VOWZNBNDMFLQGM-UHFFFAOYSA-N
- SMILES: Cc1ccc(C)c(N)c1

Properties
Chemical formula	C_{8}H_{11}N
Melting point	6 °C (43 °F; 279 K)
Boiling point	218 °C (424 °F; 491 K)

Hazards
Flash point	97
- Except where otherwise noted, data are given for materials in their standard state (at 25 °C [77 °F], 100 kPa). verify (what is ?) Infobox references

2,5-Xylidine is an organic compound with the formula C_{6}H_{3}(CH_{3})_{2}NH_{2}. It is one of several isomeric xylidines. It is a colorless viscous liquid. Commercially significant derivatives include Solvent Yellow 30, Solvent Red 22, Acid Red 65, and Solvent Red 26.

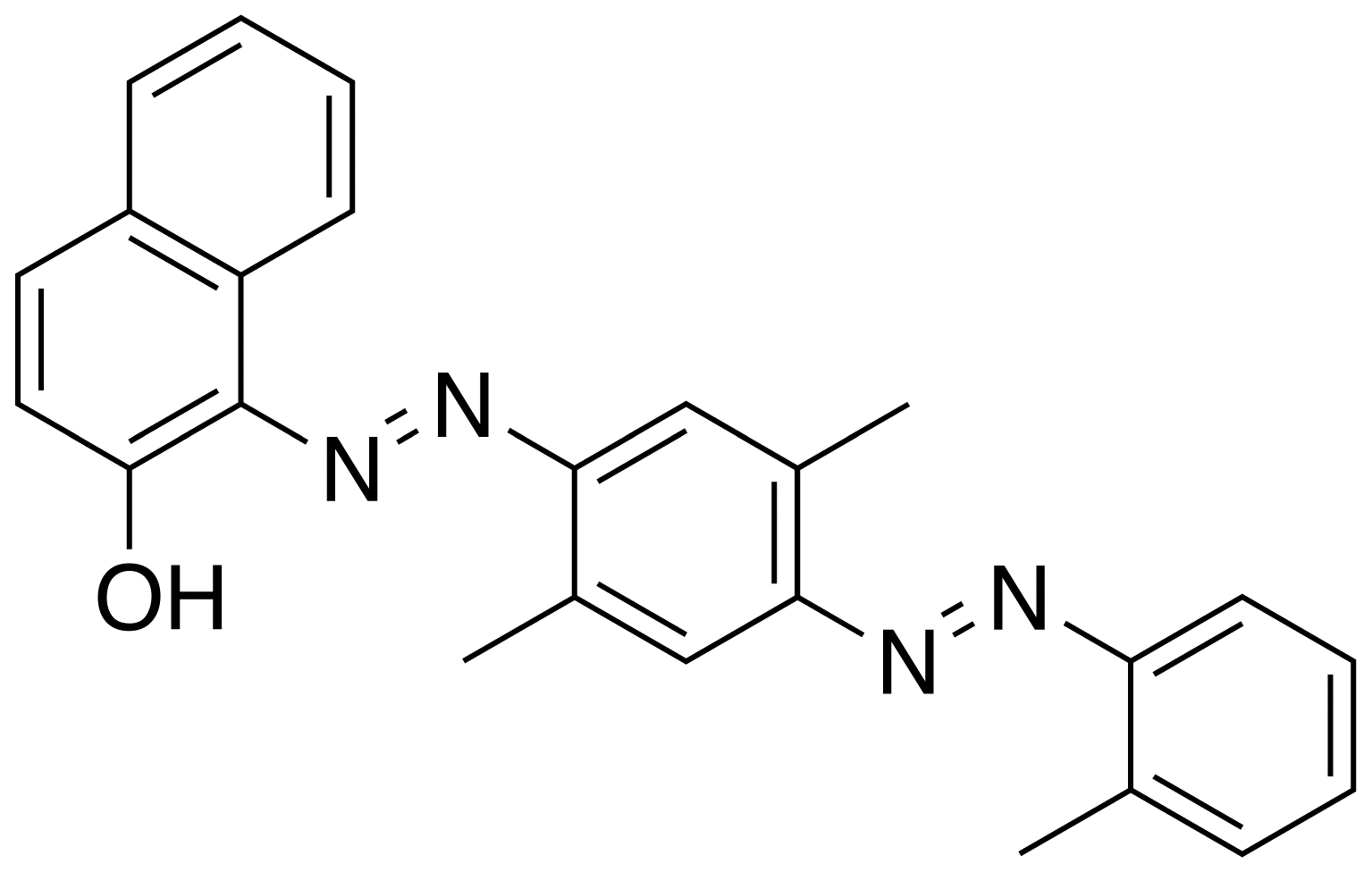
Solvent Red 26 is a commercial dye prepared from 2,5-xylidine

== Production ==
Like many xylidines, it is prepared by nitration of the corresponding xylene followed by reduction of the nitroxylene. Reduction can be effected with HCl/Fe, but usually is achieved by catalytic hydrogenation:

Me_{2}C_{6}H_{4} + HNO_{3} → Me_{2}C_{6}H_{3}NO_{2} + H_{2}O
Me_{2}C_{6}H_{3}NO_{2} + 3 H_{2} → Me_{2}C_{6}H_{3}NH_{2} + 3H_{2}O

== Safety ==
It is mutagenic and tumor-inducing. Acute toxicity of xylidines is modest as indicated by LD50 (rats, oral) are in the range 0.1-1 g/kg.
