= Antrafenine =

Chemical compound

Clinical data
- Routes of administration: Oral
- ATC code: none

Legal status
- Legal status: In general: ℞ (Prescription only)

Pharmacokinetic data
- Metabolism: Hepatic
- Excretion: Renal

Identifiers
- IUPAC name: 2-{4-[3-(trifluoromethyl)phenyl]piperazin-1-yl}ethyl 2-{[7-(trifluoromethyl)quinolin-4-yl]amino}benzoate
- CAS Number: 55300-29-3
- PubChem CID: 68723
- DrugBank: DB01419
- ChemSpider: 61973
- UNII: 21FS93Y6OE
- ChEMBL: ChEMBL345524
- CompTox Dashboard (EPA): DTXSID60203833

Chemical and physical data
- Formula: C_{30}H_{26}F_{6}N_{4}O_{2}
- Molar mass: 588.554 g·mol^{−1}
- 3D model (JSmol): Interactive image
- SMILES: FC(F)(F)c5ccc1c(nccc1Nc2ccccc2C(=O)OCCN4CCN(c3cc(ccc3)C(F)(F)F)CC4)c5
- InChI: InChI=1S/C30H26F6N4O2/c31-29(32,33)20-4-3-5-22(18-20)40-14-12-39(13-15-40)16-17-42-28(41)24-6-1-2-7-25(24)38-26-10-11-37-27-19-21(30(34,35)36)8-9-23(26)27/h1-11,18-19H,12-17H2,(H,37,38); Key:NWGGKKGAFZIVBJ-UHFFFAOYSA-N

Antrafenine (Stakane) is a phenylpiperazine derivative drug invented in 1979. It acts as an analgesic and anti-inflammatory drug with similar efficacy to naproxen, but is not widely used as it has largely been replaced by newer drugs.

== Synthesis ==
Thieme Synthesis: Patents:

Method E: The reaction between 2-[4-[3-(trifluoromethyl)phenyl]-1-piperazinyl]ethanol [40004-29-3] (1) and Isatoic anhydride [118-48-9] (2) goes on to give 4-(3-(Trifluoromethyl)phenyl)piperazine-1-ethyl 2-aminobenzoate [51941-08-3] (3).

Method G: Alkylation with 4-chloro-7-(trifluoromethyl)quinoline [346-55-4] (4) completed the synthesis of antrafenine (5).

== See also ==
- Phenylpiperazine
- Trifluoromethylphenylpiperazine
