= Pelanserin =

Clinical data
- Other names: TR2515; TR-2515
- Routes of administration: Oral
- Drug class: Serotonin 5-HT_{2A} receptor antagonist; α_{1}-Adrenergic receptor antagonist
- ATC code: None

Pharmacokinetic data
- Onset of action: <1 hour (T_{max})
- Elimination half-life: 3.8 hours

Identifiers
- IUPAC name: 3-[3-(4-phenylpiperazin-1-yl)propyl]quinazoline-2,4(1H,3H)-dione
- CAS Number: 2208-51-7
- PubChem CID: 65435
- ChemSpider: 58898
- UNII: 6SNR96E409
- CompTox Dashboard (EPA): DTXSID60176578

Chemical and physical data
- Formula: C_{21}H_{24}N_{4}O_{2}
- Molar mass: 364.449 g·mol^{−1}
- 3D model (JSmol): Interactive image
- SMILES: C1CN(CCN1CCCN2C(=O)C3=CC=CC=C3NC2=O)C4=CC=CC=C4
- InChI: InChI=1S/C21H24N4O2/c26-20-18-9-4-5-10-19(18)22-21(27)25(20)12-6-11-23-13-15-24(16-14-23)17-7-2-1-3-8-17/h1-5,7-10H,6,11-16H2,(H,22,27); Key:WPKPLSFHHBBLRY-UHFFFAOYSA-N

Pelanserin (developmental code name TR-2515) is a serotonin 5-HT_{2} and α_{1}-adrenergic receptor antagonist which was under development for the treatment of hypertension but was never marketed. Its development was discontinued in 2001.

== Pharmacology ==
=== Pharmacokinetics ===
The pharmacokinetics of pelanserin have been studied. It has a relatively short elimination half-life. The drug's time to peak levels was less than 1 hour and its half-life was 3.8 hours in a single subject in an analytical study.

== Chemistry ==
=== Synthesis ===
Synthesis of pelanserin

Pelanserin (3) can be synthesized by a reaction between isatoic anhydride (1) and 1-(3-aminopropyl)-4-phenylpiperazine (2) in the presence of phosgene.

== See also ==
- Serotonin 5-HT_{2A} receptor antagonist
- Ketanserin
