= Streptomyces aurantiogriseus =

Scientific classification
- Domain: Bacteria
- Kingdom: Bacillati
- Phylum: Actinomycetota
- Class: Actinomycetia
- Order: Streptomycetales
- Family: Streptomycetaceae
- Genus: Streptomyces
- Species: S. aurantiogriseus

Binomial name
- Streptomyces aurantiogriseus Preobrazhenskaya 1957) Pridham et al. 1958 (Approved Lists 1980)

Type strain
- AS 4.1450, ATCC 19887, ATCC 23883, BCRC 13758, CBS 663.68, CCRC 13758, CGMCC 4.1450, DSM 40138, ETH 24202, ETH 27525, IFO 12842, INA 10369/58, ISP 5138, JCM 4346, KCC S-0346, KCCS-0346, LMG 19298, NBRC 12842, NCIB 9849, NCIMB 9849, NRRL B-5416, NRRL-ISP 5138, R-8658, RIA 1130, VKM Ac-1093

Synonyms
- Actinomyces aurantiogriseus

Species of bacterium

Streptomyces aurantiogriseus is a bacterium species from the genus Streptomyces which has been isolated from soil in Russia. Streptomyces aurantiogriseus produces differolide and acetamidobenzoic acid.

== See also ==
- List of Streptomyces species
