= Flufenoxine =

SNRI/SNDRI used to treat depression and other CNS pathologies (Alzheimer's)

Clinical data
- Other names: F-98214-TA

Identifiers
- IUPAC name: 4-[(3-fluorophenoxy)-phenylmethyl]piperidine
- CAS Number: 957202-15-2
- PubChem CID: 9817317
- ChemSpider: 7993067
- ChEMBL: ChEMBL152935

Chemical and physical data
- Formula: C_{18}H_{20}FNO
- Molar mass: 285.362 g·mol^{−1}
- 3D model (JSmol): Interactive image
- SMILES: C1CNCCC1C(C2=CC=CC=C2)OC3=CC(=CC=C3)F
- InChI: InChI=1S/C18H20FNO/c19-16-7-4-8-17(13-16)21-18(14-5-2-1-3-6-14)15-9-11-20-12-10-15/h1-8,13,15,18,20H,9-12H2; Key:FDHPZDXAAGIHFC-UHFFFAOYSA-N

Flufenoxine (F-98214-TA) is a Serotonin–norepinephrine reuptake inhibitor. It can be used to treat disorders of the central nervous system, particularly depression and anxiety. It was developed by a Spanish company at the beginning of the 21st century.

Flufenoxine derivatives have been patented for the treatment of Alzheimer's disease.

Analogues of Flufenoxine were reported containing a duloxetine-type thiophene surrogate ring moiety. Such agents possess the desired triple-mode of activity (serotonin-noradrenaline and dopamine) (cf. SNDRI).

For another related SNDRI agent see PC71812205. The racemic agent had IC50's of 11, 14, 190nM S~N>D.
