= Bicyclo(2.2.1)heptane-2-carbonitrile =

Bicyclo[2.2.1]heptane-2-carbonitrile

Names
- IUPAC name Bicyclo[2.2.1]heptane-2-carbonitrile
- Other names 2-Norbornanecarbonitrile

Identifiers
CAS Number	2234-26-6; 3211-87-8 (endo); 3211-90-3 (exo)
3D model (JSmol)	Interactive image
ChemSpider	92361
ECHA InfoCard	100.017.076
PubChem CID	102231
UNII	57U33ASF4X
CompTox Dashboard (EPA)	DTXSID90870431 DTXSID20870949, DTXSID90870431
- InChI: InChI=1S/C8H11N/c9-5-8-4-6-1-2-7(8)3-6/h6-8H,1-4H2 Key: GAHKEUUHTHVKEA-UHFFFAOYSA-N; InChI=1/C8H11N/c9-5-8-4-6-1-2-7(8)3-6/h6-8H,1-4H2 Key: GAHKEUUHTHVKEA-UHFFFAOYAS
- SMILES: N#CC2CC1CCC2C1

Properties
Chemical formula	C_{8}H_{11}N
Molar mass	121.183 g·mol^{−1}
Melting point	43 to 45 °C (109 to 113 °F; 316 to 318 K) 10 mmHg
Boiling point	73 to 75 °C (163 to 167 °F; 346 to 348 K)10 mmHg
- Except where otherwise noted, data are given for materials in their standard state (at 25 °C [77 °F], 100 kPa). Infobox references

Bicyclo[2.2.1]heptane-2-carbonitrile is an organic compound with the formula C_{7}H_{11}CN. Two diastereomers exist, each of which is chiral. All are colorless solids. The mixture can be prepared by hydrocyanation of norbornene.
