= Cloperidone =

Hypotensive sedative

Identifiers
- IUPAC name: 3-[3-[4-(3-chlorophenyl)piperazin-1-yl]propyl]-1H-quinazoline-2,4-dione
- CAS Number: 4052-13-5
- PubChem CID: 10675
- ChemSpider: 10225
- UNII: 8FP5Y6U39R
- ChEMBL: ChEMBL2110792
- CompTox Dashboard (EPA): DTXSID30193530

Chemical and physical data
- Formula: C_{21}H_{23}ClN_{4}O_{2}
- Molar mass: 398.89 g·mol^{−1}
- 3D model (JSmol): Interactive image
- SMILES: C1CN(CCN1CCCN2C(=O)C3=CC=CC=C3NC2=O)C4=CC(=CC=C4)Cl
- InChI: InChI=1S/C21H23ClN4O2/c22-16-5-3-6-17(15-16)25-13-11-24(12-14-25)9-4-10-26-20(27)18-7-1-2-8-19(18)23-21(26)28/h1-3,5-8,15H,4,9-14H2,(H,23,28); Key:FXZJKVODWNYPKK-UHFFFAOYSA-N

Cloperidone is a quinazolinedione derivative first reported in 1965 by Miles Laboratories, notable for its sedative and antihypertensive properties. Its pharmacological activity has been demonstrated in various animal models, including behavioral studies in dogs and cats, as well as motor coordination and locomotor activity assays in mice. Cloperidone is not an approved drug and appears to remain an experimental compound with no current clinical use.
