= Tolfenamic acid =

Non-steroidal anti-inflammatory drug

Clinical data
- Trade names: Clotam, Clotan, Tufnil, Migea
- AHFS/Drugs.com: International Drug Names
- Routes of administration: By mouth
- ATC code: M01AG02 (WHO)

Legal status
- Legal status: AU: S4 (Prescription only); EU: Rx-only

Identifiers
- IUPAC name: 2-[(3-chloro-2-methylphenyl)amino]benzoic acid)
- CAS Number: 13710-19-5
- PubChem CID: 610479
- DrugBank: DB09216
- ChemSpider: 530683
- UNII: 3G943U18KM
- KEGG: D01183
- ChEBI: CHEBI:32243
- ChEMBL: ChEMBL121626
- CompTox Dashboard (EPA): DTXSID1045409
- ECHA InfoCard: 100.033.862

Chemical and physical data
- Formula: C_{14}H_{12}ClNO_{2}
- Molar mass: 261.71 g·mol^{−1}
- 3D model (JSmol): Interactive image
- SMILES: Clc2cccc(Nc1ccccc1C(=O)O)c2C
- InChI: InChI=1S/C14H12ClNO2/c1-9-11(15)6-4-8-12(9)16-13-7-3-2-5-10(13)14(17)18/h2-8,16H,1H3,(H,17,18); Key:YEZNLOUZAIOMLT-UHFFFAOYSA-N

Tolfenamic acid is a member of the anthranilic acid derivatives (or fenamate) class of NSAID drugs. Like other members of the class, it is a COX inhibitor and prevents formation of prostaglandins.

It is used in the UK as a treatment for migraine. It is generally not available in the US. It is available in some Asian, Latin American and European countries as a generic drug for humans and for animals.

== Medical uses ==
Tolfenamic acid is used in the prevention and treatment of conditions associated with pain and inflammation. However, despite its efficacy when administered intramuscularly, subcutaneously, or orally, TFA-based drugs have not yet gained approval in the United States and some other countries due to the significant number of reported side effects.

== Chemistry ==
Tolfenamic acid, belonging to the pharmacological group of fenamates, possesses a chemical structure typical of anthranilic acid derivatives. In this structure, one of the hydrogen atoms of the nitro group is substituted by a benzene ring substituted with a methyl group in the ortho position and a chlorine atom in the meta position."

Nine forms of tolfenamic acid have been identified, some of which are determined by conformational states. These polymorphic forms exhibit variations in the spatial arrangement within the unit cell and in the values of the C-N(H)-C-C angle. This diversity in solid forms makes TFA an attractive candidate for modification and utilization in medical applications.

== History ==
It was discovered by scientists at Gea Pharmaceutical Company in Denmark.

== Research ==
Tolfenamic acid has demonstrated antiproliferative effects against pancreatic, sigmoid-colon, and rectal cancer cell lines in preclinical studies.
