= (2-Bromophenyl)diphenylphosphine =

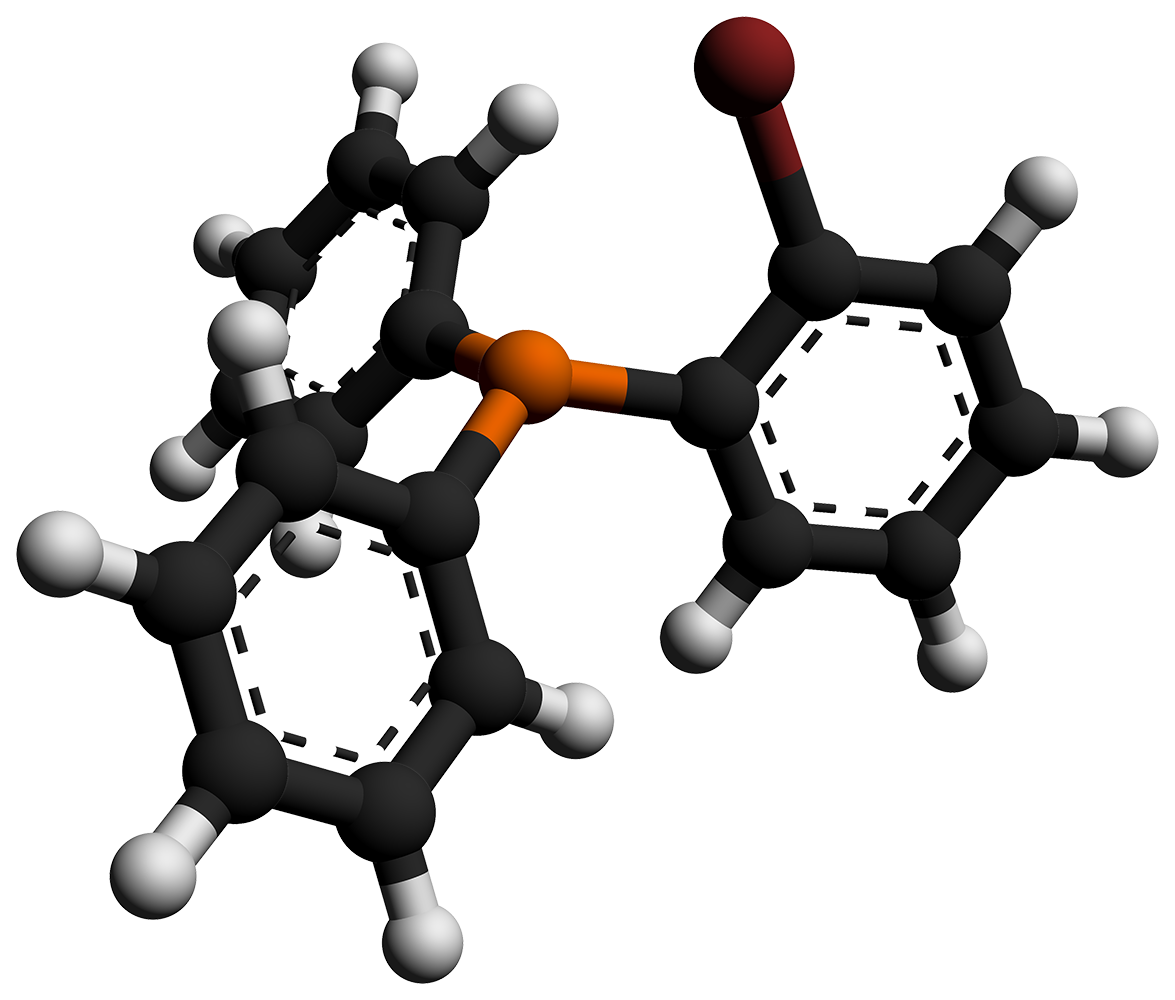
- Ball-and-stick model of the (2-bromophenyl)diphenylphosphine molecule

Names
- Preferred IUPAC name (2-Bromophenyl)di(phenyl)phosphane
- Other names (o-Bromophenyl)diphenylphosphine

Identifiers
CAS Number	62336-24-7
3D model (JSmol)	Interactive image
ChemSpider	101130
EC Number	263-515-1
PubChem CID	112836
UNII	S8AQ9M4YUR
CompTox Dashboard (EPA)	DTXSID60211392
- InChI: InChI=1S/C18H14BrP/c19-17-13-7-8-14-18(17)20(15-9-3-1-4-10-15)16-11-5-2-6-12-16/h1-14H Key: XIONUQPOXCUMMB-UHFFFAOYSA-N; InChI=1/C18H14BrP/c19-17-13-7-8-14-18(17)20(15-9-3-1-4-10-15)16-11-5-2-6-12-16/h1-14H Key: XIONUQPOXCUMMB-UHFFFAOYAI
- SMILES: c1ccc(cc1)P(c2ccccc2)c3ccccc3Br

Properties
Chemical formula	C_{18}H_{14}BrP
Molar mass	341.188 g·mol^{−1}
Appearance	White solid
Melting point	115 °C (239 °F; 388 K)
- Except where otherwise noted, data are given for materials in their standard state (at 25 °C [77 °F], 100 kPa). Infobox references

(2-Bromophenyl)diphenylphosphine is an organophosphorus compound with the formula (C_{6}H_{4}Br)P(C_{6}H_{5})_{2}. It is a white crystalline solid that is soluble in nonpolar organic solvents. The compound is used as a precursor to the 2-lithiated derivative of triphenylphosphine, which in turn is a precursor to other phosphine ligands.

== Preparation ==
The compound has been prepared by several methods. An efficient route is the coupling reaction of diphenylphosphine and 2-bromoiodobenzene, which is catalyzed by palladium complexes (Ph = C_{6}H_{5}):

C_{6}H_{4}Br(I) + HPPh_{2} + Et_{3}N → Ph_{2}P(C_{6}H_{4}Br) + [Et_{3}NH]I

The compound is isomorphous with (2-tolyl)diphenylphosphine.

Lithiation with butyl lithium gives o-lithiated triphenylphosphine. The bromide also forms a Grignard reagent. These metallated phosphines are versatile reagents.

BrC_{6}H_{4}PPh_{2} + Mg → BrMgC_{6}H_{4}PPh_{2}
2 BrMgC_{6}H_{4}PPh_{2} + PhPCl_{2} → PhP[C_{6}H_{4}PPh_{2}]_{2} + 2 MgClBr
