= Anthranilic acid =

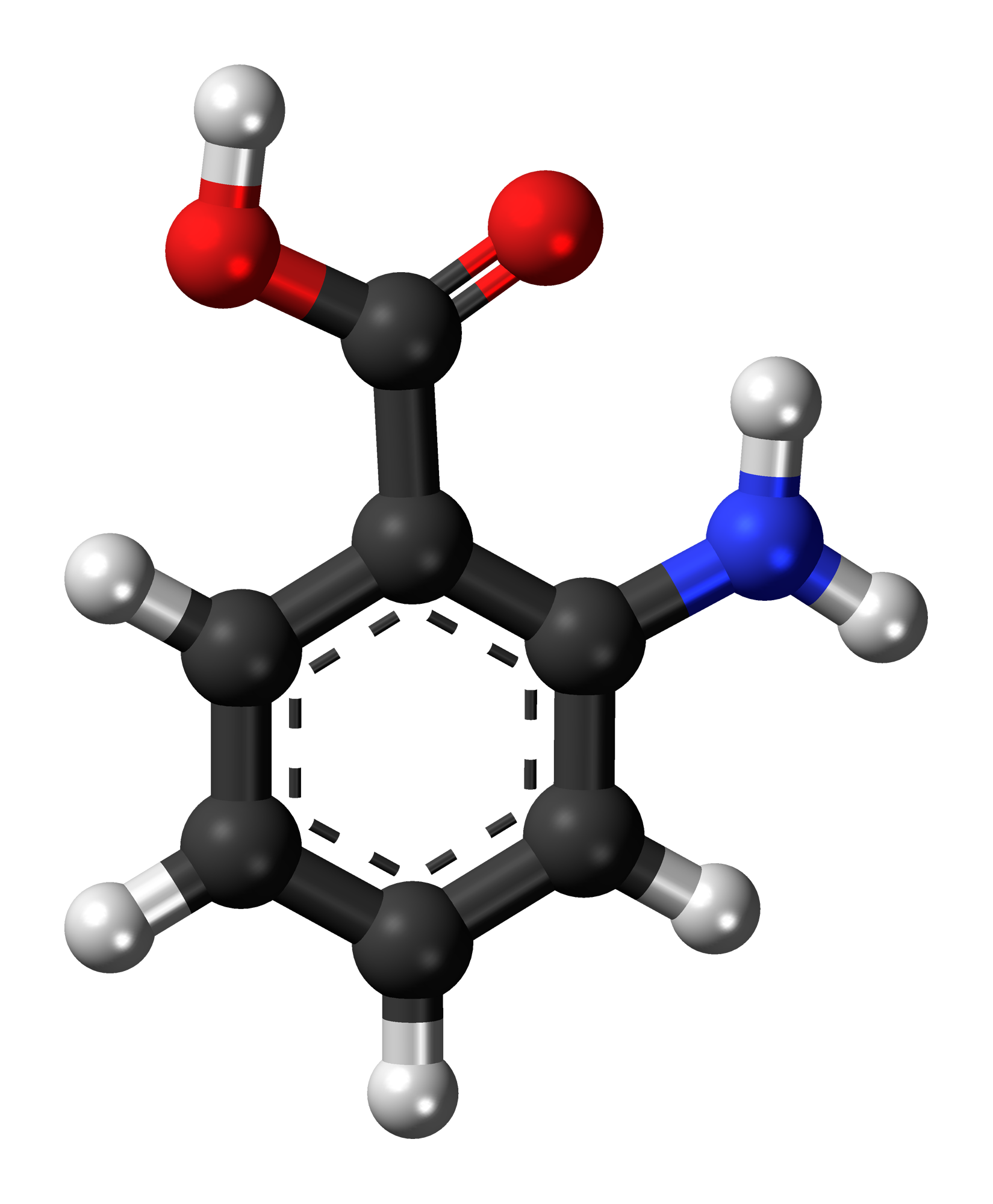
C=black, H=white, O=red, N=blue

Names
- Preferred IUPAC name 2-Aminobenzoic acid
- Systematic IUPAC name 2-Aminobenzenecarboxylic acid
- Other names: Anthranilic acid; o-Aminobenzoic acid; 2-Aminobenzoic acid; Vitamin L_{1}; Anthranilate (conjugate base); 2-AA, 2AA, AA

Identifiers
CAS Number	118-92-3
3D model (JSmol)	Interactive image
Beilstein Reference	471803
ChEBI	CHEBI:30754
ChEMBL	ChEMBL14173
ChemSpider	222
DrugBank	DB04166
ECHA InfoCard	100.003.898
EC Number	204-287-5
Gmelin Reference	3397
KEGG	C00108
PubChem CID	227
RTECS number	CB2450000
UNII	0YS975XI6W
CompTox Dashboard (EPA)	DTXSID8020094
- InChI: InChI=1S/C7H7NO2/c8-6-4-2-1-3-5(6)7(9)10/h1-4H,8H2,(H,9,10) Key: RWZYAGGXGHYGMB-UHFFFAOYSA-N; InChI=1/C7H7NO2/c8-6-4-2-1-3-5(6)7(9)10/h1-4H,8H2,(H,9,10) Key: RWZYAGGXGHYGMB-UHFFFAOYAS
- SMILES: O=C(O)c1ccccc1N

Properties
Chemical formula	C_{7}H_{7}NO_{2}
Molar mass	137.138 g·mol^{−1}
Appearance	white or yellow solid
Odor	odorless
Density	1.412 g/cm^{3}
Melting point	146 to 148 °C (295 to 298 °F; 419 to 421 K)
Boiling point	200 °C (392 °F; 473 K) (sublimes)
Solubility in water	0.572 g/100 mL (25 °C)
Solubility	very soluble in chloroform, pyridine soluble in ethanol, ether, ethyl ether slightly soluble in trifluoroacetic acid, benzene
log P	1.21
Vapor pressure	0.1 Pa (52.6 °C)
Acidity (pK_{a})	2.17 (amino; H_{2}O); 4.85 (carboxyl; H_{2}O)
Magnetic susceptibility (χ)	−77.18·10^{−6} cm^{3}/mol
Refractive index (n_{D})	1.578 (144 °C)

Thermochemistry
Std enthalpy of formation (Δ_{f}H^{⦵}_{298})	−380.4 KJ/mol

Hazards
- GHS labelling
Pictograms	(GHS05: Corrosive) (GHS07: Exclamation mark)
Signal word	Danger
Hazard statements	H318, H319
Precautionary statements	P264, P280, P305+P351+P338, P310, P337+P313
NFPA 704 (fire diamond)	2 1 0
Flash point	> 150 °C (302 °F; 423 K)
Autoignition temperature	> 530 °C (986 °F; 803 K)
- Lethal dose or concentration (LD, LC)
LD_{50} (median dose)	1400 mg/kg (oral, rat)
Safety data sheet (SDS)	External MSDS
Legal status	BR: Class D1 (Drug precursors)
- Except where otherwise noted, data are given for materials in their standard state (at 25 °C [77 °F], 100 kPa). verify (what is ?) Infobox references

Anthranilic acid is an aromatic acid with the formula C_{6}H_{4}(NH_{2})(CO_{2}H) and has a sweetish taste. The molecule consists of a benzene ring, ortho-substituted with a carboxylic acid and an amine. As a result of containing both acidic and basic functional groups, the compound is amphoteric. Anthranilic acid is a white solid when pure, although commercial samples may appear yellow. The anion [C_{6}H_{4}(NH_{2})(CO_{2})]^{−}, obtained by the deprotonation of anthranilic acid, is called anthranilate. Anthranilic acid was once thought to be a vitamin and was referred to as vitamin L_{1} in that context, but it is now known to be non-essential in human nutrition.

== Structure ==
Solid anthranilic acid crystallizes as a 1:1 mixture of the amino-carboxylic acid and the zwitterionic ammonium carboxylate forms. It is triboluminescent. Above 81 °C (178 °F; 354 K), it converts from monoclinic P2_{1} polymorph to an orthorhombic form with space group Pbca, which is not triboluminescent. A non-triboluminescent monoclinic phase with similar structure is also known.

== History and etymology ==
In 1840-1841, Carl Julius Fritzsche was able to extract and crystallize two acids from the products of reaction of indigo dye with caustic potash, which he called chrysanilic and anthranilic acids after their colors before purification (golden yellow and black respectively) and the plant anil (Indigofera suffruticosa). The former was identified as ortho-carboxy anil of indoxyl-2-aldehyde only in 1910 while the latter was identified as salicylamide already in 1843 by Cahours.

== Production ==
Many routes to anthranilic acid have been described. Industrially it is produced from phthalic anhydride, beginning with amination:

C_{6}H_{4}(CO)_{2}O + NH_{3} + NaOH → C_{6}H_{4}(C(O)NH_{2})CO_{2}Na + H_{2}O

The resulting sodium salt of phthalamic acid is decarbonylated via a Hofmann rearrangement of the amide group, induced by hypochlorite:

C_{6}H_{4}(C(O)NH_{2})CO_{2}Na + HOCl → C_{6}H_{4}NH_{2}CO_{2}H + NaCl + CO_{2}

A related method involves treating phthalimide with sodium hypobromite in aqueous sodium hydroxide, followed by neutralization. In the era when indigo dye was obtained from plants, it was degraded to give anthranilic acid.

Anthranilic acid was first obtained by base-induced degradation of indigo.

=== Biosynthesis ===
Anthranilic acid is biosynthesized from chorismic acid by the action of anthranilate synthase. In organisms capable of tryptophan synthesis, anthranilate is a precursor to the amino acid tryptophan via the attachment of phosphoribosyl pyrophosphate to the amine group. After then, cyclization occurs to produce indole.

Anthranilate is the biosynthetic precursor to the amino acid tryptophan.

== Uses ==
Industrially, anthranilic acid is an intermediate in the production of azo dyes (c.f. methyl red) and saccharin. It and its esters are used in preparing perfumes to mimic jasmine and orange, pharmaceuticals (loop diuretics, such as furosemide) and UV-absorber as well as corrosion inhibitors for metals and mold inhibitors in soy sauce.

Anthranilate-based insect repellents have been proposed as replacements for DEET.

Fenamic acid is a derivative of anthranilic acid, which in turn is a nitrogen isostere of salicylic acid, which is the active metabolite of aspirin. Several non-steroidal anti-inflammatory drugs, including mefenamic acid, tolfenamic acid, flufenamic acid, and meclofenamic acid are derived from fenamic acid or anthranilic acid and are called "anthranilic acid derivatives" or "fenamates".

Anthranilic acid [118-92-3] was demonstrated to have utility in the synthesis of the following list of substances: clozapine, quetiapine, thiosalicylic acid, ofornine, strinoline, ciliobrevin A, bentazon, quinezamide, nifurquinazol, nitromethaqualone, & YT-1 (1-azaflavone) [14802-18-7], atolide (actually isatoic anhydride), melicopicine. & tranilast. U-17660 [13450-72-1] & THA-Q [4425-23-4].

== Reactions ==
Anthranilic acid can be diazotized to give the diazonium cation [C_{6}H_{4}(CO_{2}H)(N_{2})]^{+}. This cation can be used to generate benzyne, dimerized to give diphenic acid, or undergo diazonium coupling reactions such as in the synthesis of methyl red.

It reacts with phosgene to give isatoic anhydride, a versatile reagent.

Chlorination of anthranilic acid gives the 2,4-dichloro derivative, which can undergo reductive coupling to form a biaryl compound.

== Safety and regulation ==
It is also a DEA List I Chemical because of its use in making the now-widely outlawed euphoric sedative drug methaqualone (Quaalude, Mandrax).

== See also ==
- Kynureninase
- 3-Aminobenzoic acid
- 4-Aminobenzoic acid
- Methyl anthranilate
