= 3-Aminobenzamide =

Names
- Preferred IUPAC name 3-Aminobenzamide
- Other names: meta-Aminobenzamide; 3-AB; 3-ABA

Identifiers
CAS Number	3544-24-9
3D model (JSmol)	Interactive image
ChEBI	CHEBI:64042
ChemSpider	1583
ECHA InfoCard	100.020.534
EC Number	222-586-9
PubChem CID	1645
UNII	8J365YF1YH
CompTox Dashboard (EPA)	DTXSID90188922
- InChI: InChI=1S/C7H8N2O/c8-6-3-1-2-5(4-6)7(9)10/h1-4H,8H2,(H2,9,10)
- SMILES: C1=CC(=CC(=C1)N)C(=O)N

Properties
Chemical formula	C_{7}H_{8}N_{2}O
Molar mass	136.154 g·mol^{−1}
Appearance	Off-white powder
Density	1.233g/cm^{3}
Melting point	115 to 116 °C (239 to 241 °F; 388 to 389 K)
Boiling point	329 °C (624 °F; 602 K)
log P	0.33

Hazards
- GHS labelling
Pictograms	(GHS07: Exclamation mark)
Signal word	Danger
Hazard statements	H302, H315, H319, H335
Precautionary statements	P338, P351
NFPA 704 (fire diamond)	2 0 0
- Lethal dose or concentration (LD, LC)
LD_{50} (median dose)	1000mg/kg (oral, bird)
Safety data sheet (SDS)	Sigma-Aldrich
- Except where otherwise noted, data are given for materials in their standard state (at 25 °C [77 °F], 100 kPa). Infobox references

3-Aminobenzamide is a benzamide. It is an off-white powder and has the chemical formula C_{7}H_{8}N_{2}O.

== Preparation ==
3-Aminobenzamide can be prepared through the reduction of 3-nitrobenzamide by catalytic hydrogenation.

== Uses ==
3-Aminobenzamide is an inhibitor of poly ADP ribose polymerase (PARP), an enzyme responsible for DNA repair, transcription control, and programmed cell death. When PARP is activated it rapidly uses up stores of nicotinamide adenine dinucleotide (NAD^{+}) in the cell as it performs DNA repair. Low levels of NAD^{+} deplete the amount of ATP found in the cell which can lead to cell death. The structure of 3-aminobenzamide is similar to that of NAD^{+} so it binds to PARP and prevents it from using up NAD^{+}. PARP is often a target of cancer therapy and so 3-aminobenzamide could potentially be used as an anticancer drug.
