= Anthranilamide =

Names
- Preferred IUPAC name 2-Aminobenzamide
- Systematic IUPAC name 2-Aminobenzamide
- Other names: Anthranilamide

Identifiers
CAS Number	88-68-6
3D model (JSmol)	Interactive image
ChEBI	CHEBI:193638
ChEMBL	ChEMBL43175
ChemSpider	10298355
ECHA InfoCard	100.001.683
EC Number	201-851-2
PubChem CID	6942
UNII	Q1M2WEK6VA
CompTox Dashboard (EPA)	DTXSID2021789
- InChI: InChI=1S/C7H8N2O/c8-6-4-2-1-3-5(6)7(9)10/h1-4H,8H2,(H2,9,10) Key: PXBFMLJZNCDSMP-UHFFFAOYSA-N
- SMILES: C1=CC=C(C(=C1)C(=O)N)N

Properties
Chemical formula	C_{7}H_{8}N_{2}O
Molar mass	136.154 g·mol^{−1}
Appearance	white or yellow solid
Odor	odorless
Density	1.17 g/cm^{3}
Melting point	111 to 113 °C (232 to 235 °F; 384 to 386 K)
Boiling point	300 °C (572 °F; 573 K)
Solubility in water	5 g/L (20 °C)
Solubility	very soluble in ethyl acetate soluble in hot water, ethanol slightly soluble in diethyl ether, benzene

Hazards
- GHS labelling
Pictograms	(GHS05: Corrosive)
Signal word	Danger
Hazard statements	H318
Precautionary statements	P280, P305+P351+P338, P310
- Except where otherwise noted, data are given for materials in their standard state (at 25 °C [77 °F], 100 kPa). Infobox references

Anthranilamide is a chemical compound of the group of amides.

== Synthesis and production ==
Anthranilamide can be obtained by reacting ammonia, ammonium carbonate and ammonium chloride with isatoic anhydride.

== Properties ==
Anthranilamide is a flammable, flame-retardant, crystalline, colorless to yellowish, odorless solid that is poorly soluble in water.

== Use ==
Anthranilamide is used as an acetaldehyde scavenger in PET bottles for water. It is not required for sweet beverages, juices and beer, as the concentration of acetaldehyde in the bevereage is higher than what might migrate from the PET. Anthranilamide is also for non-selective, efficient fluorescence labeling of glycans. It is also used as an intermediate for dyes, pharmaceuticals, blowing agents and other chemicals. In lubricating oils for engines, it prevents copper and magnesium corrosion.

U-29409

1-Naphthaldehyde [66-77-3] is reacted with anthranilamide to give a 75% yield of U-29409 [31785-60-1]. This antispermatogenic agent also has antiarthritic properties.

NP-101A [33809-77-7] i.e. 2-(Acetylamino)benzamide is isolated from Streptomyces aurantiogriseus.
