= Xylidine =

Group of isomers

Xylidine can refer to any of the six isomers of xylene amine, or any mixture of them.

The chemical formula of xylidines is C_{8}H_{11}N or, more descriptively, (CH_{3})_{2}C_{6}H_{3}NH_{2}. The CAS number for the isomer mixture is 1300-73-8. They are colorless solids or liquids, although commercial samples can appear yellow or darker. They are miscible with ethanol and diethyl ether and slightly soluble in water. Xylidines are used in production of pigments and dyestuffs, and various antioxidants, agrochemicals, pharmaceuticals, hypergolic propellants, and many other organic chemicals.

In World War II, xylidine was an important antiknock agent in very high performance aviation gasolines. Its purpose was to permit high levels of boost pressure in multiple-stage turbochargers, and thus high power at high altitudes, without causing detonation that would destroy the engine. The high pressures brought high temperatures of inlet air, making engines prone to knock. This use and storage stabilization methods were important military secrets.

== Isomers of xylidine ==
2,3-xylidine

2,4-xylidine

2,5-xylidine

2,6-xylidine

3,4-xylidine

3,5-xylidine

=== 2,3-Xylidine ===
2,3-Xylidine, also called o-xylidine, 2,3-dimethylaniline, 2,3-xylylamine, or 2,3-dimethylphenylamine, is a liquid with melting point 2.5 °C and boiling point 222 °C, and flash point at 96 °C. It is used in production of mefenamic acid, dyes, and pesticides.

=== 2,4-Xylidine ===
2,4-Xylidine, also called 2-methyl-p-toluidine, 2,4-dimethylaniline, 2,4-xylylamine, or 2,4-dimethylphenylamine, is a liquid with melting point 16 °C, boiling point 217 °C, and flash point at 90 °C. It is used for production of pesticides, dyes, and other chemicals.

=== 2,5-Xylidine ===
2,5-Xylidine, also called p-xylidine, 2,5-dimethylaniline, 2,5-xylylamine, or 2,5-dimethylphenylamine, is a liquid with melting point 11.5 °C and boiling point 215 °C. It is used for production of dyes and other chemicals.

=== 2,6-Xylidine ===
2,6-Xylidine, also called 2,6-dimethylaniline, 2,6-xylylamine, or 2,6-dimethylphenylamine, is a liquid with melting point 8.4 °C and boiling point 216 °C. It is used in production of some anesthetics and other chemicals.

=== 3,4-Xylidine ===
3,4-Xylidine, also called 3,4-dimethylaniline, 3,4-xylylamine, or 3,4-dimethylphenylamine, is a crystalline solid with melting point 51 °C and boiling point 226 °C. It is used as a raw material for production of vitamin B_{2}, dyes, pesticides, and other chemicals.

=== 3,5-Xylidine ===
3,5-Xylidine, also called 3,5-dimethylaniline, 3,5-xylylamine, or 3,5-dimethylphenylamine, is a liquid with melting point 9.8 °C and boiling point 220–221 °C. It is used for production of pesticides, dyes, and other chemicals.

== Safety ==
The U.S. Occupational Safety and Health Administration (OSHA) has set the legal limit (Permissible exposure limit) for xylidine exposure in the workplace as 5 ppm (25 mg/m^{3}) skin exposure over an eight-hour workday. The U.S. National Institute for Occupational Safety and Health (NIOSH) has set a Recommended exposure limit (REL) of 2 ppm (10 mg/m^{3}) skin exposure over an eight-hour workday. At levels of 50 ppm, xylidine is immediately dangerous to life and health.

Their hazard and precaution phrases are H302, H312, H315, H332, H335, H351, H411 P201, P202, P261, P264, P270, P271, P273, P280, P281, P301+P312, P302+P352, P304+P312, P304+P340, P308+P313, P312, P321, P322, P330, P332+P313, P362, P363, P391, P403+P233, P405, P501.
