= Benzene (disambiguation) =

Benzene is an aromatic hydrocarbon.

Benzene or related words may also refer to:

- Benzene (data page)
- The homophones benzene and benzine are alternate names for gasoline in many countries
- Benzine can refer to petroleum ether
- "Benzin" is a song by Rammstein
- Benzene Convention, 1971
- Benzyne, the hydrocarbon 1,2-didehydrobenzene
- Benzene were an Israeli band featuring Yehuda Poliker
