= Catechase =

Catechase may refer to:

- catechol dioxygenase
- Catechol 1,2-dioxygenase
- Catechol 2,3-dioxygenase
