= Benzene =

Hydrocarbon compound (C6H6)

- Skeletal formula detail of benzene. Skeletal formula

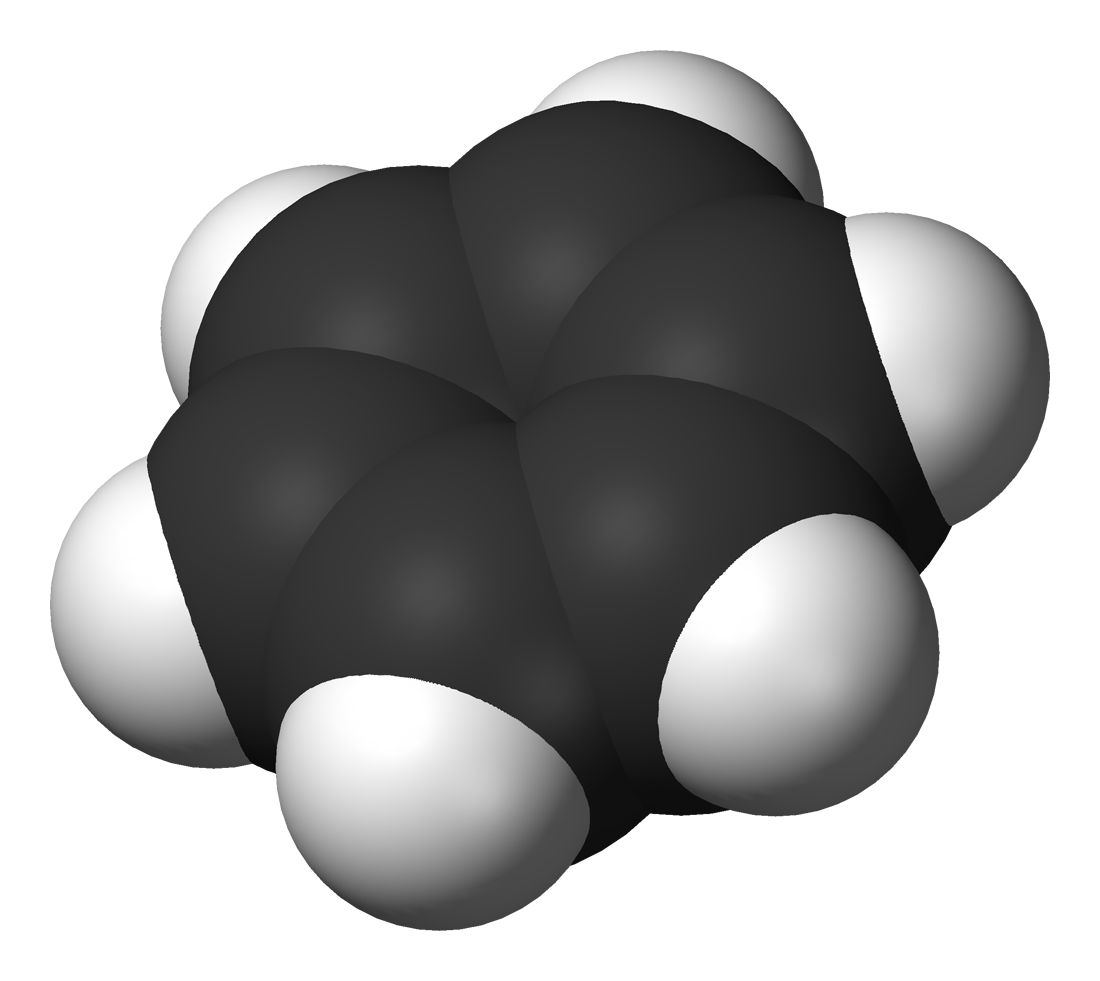
Benzene molecule
Space-filling model
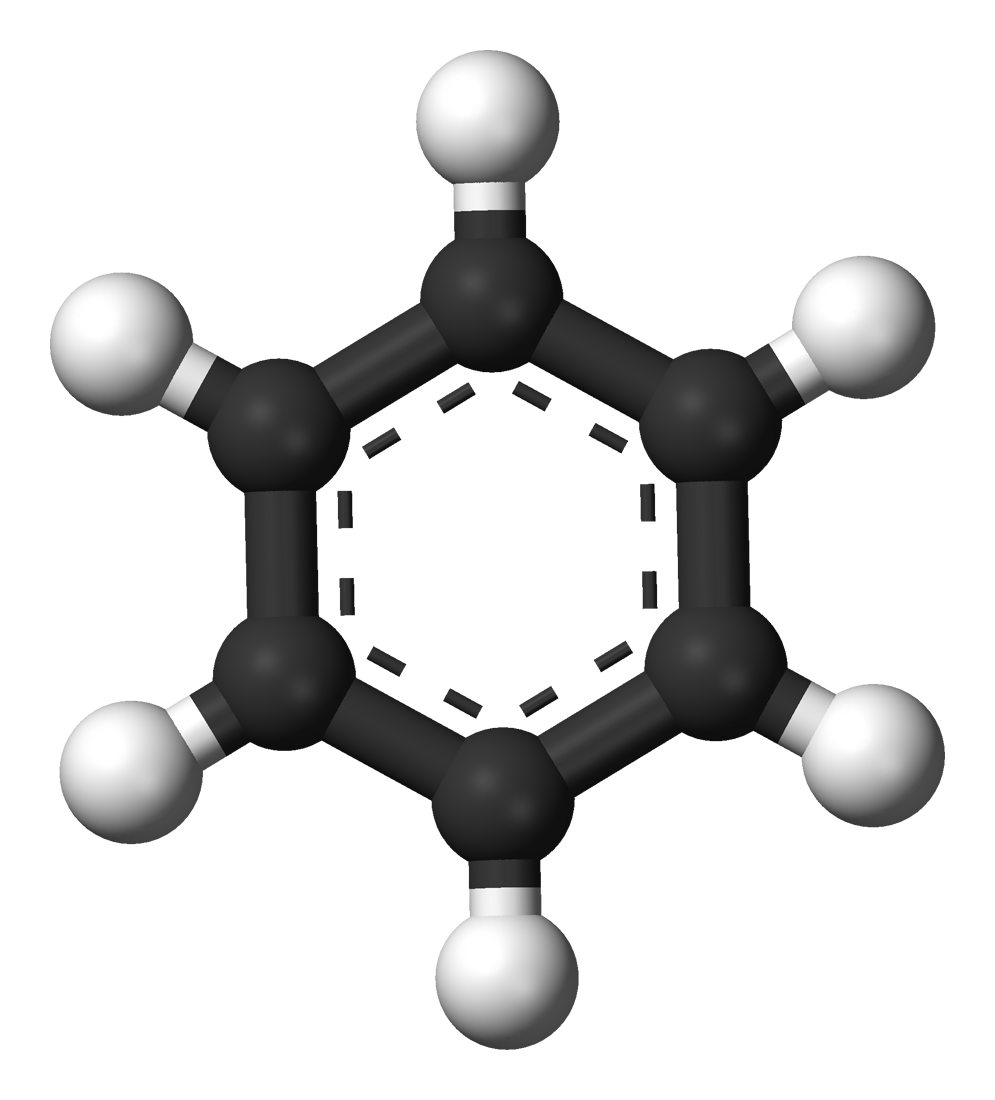
Benzene ball-and-stick model
Ball and stick model
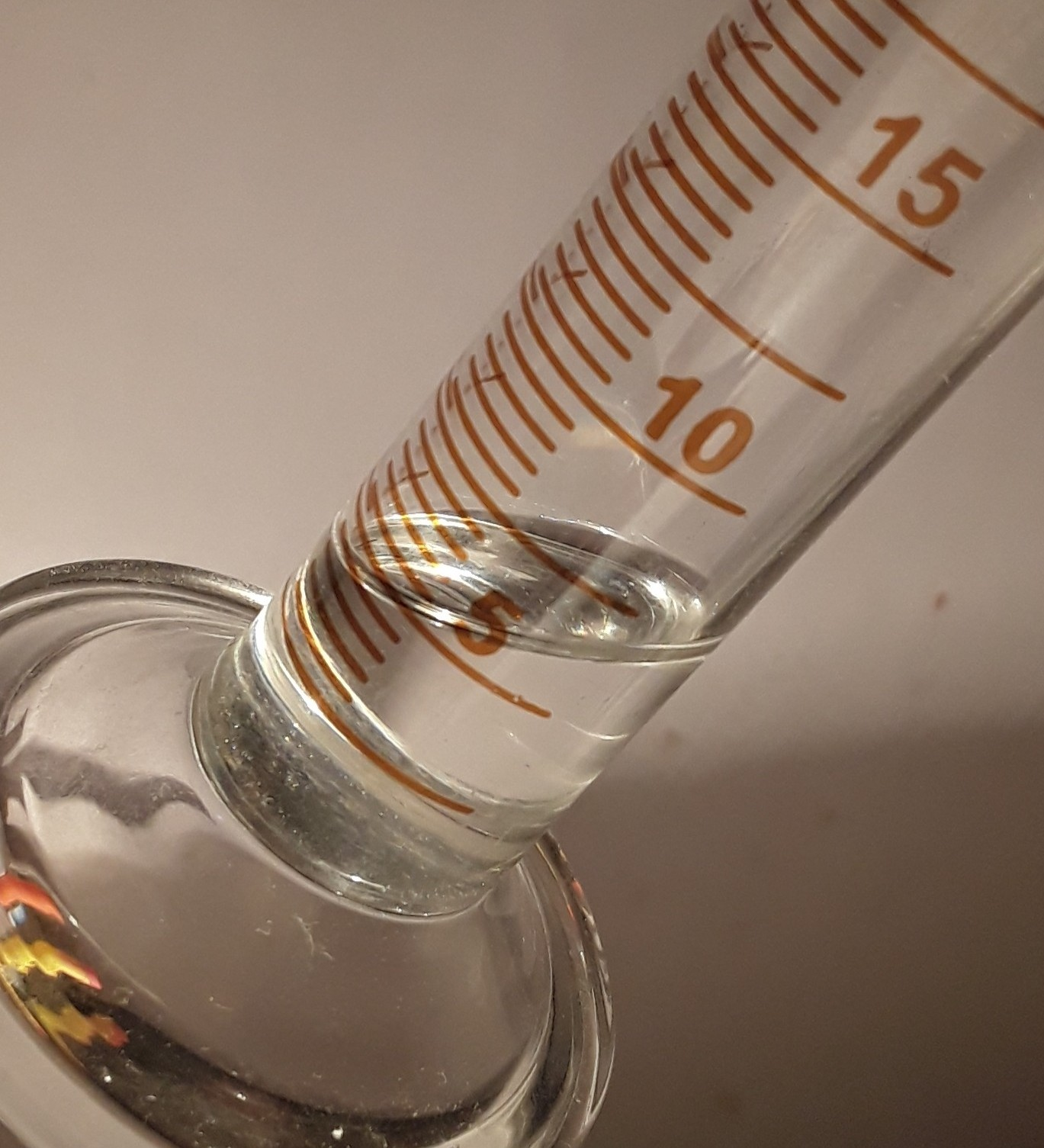
- Sample of benzene Benzene at room temperature

Names
- Preferred IUPAC name Benzene
- Other names Benzol (historic/German); Cyclohexa-1,3,5-triene; 1,3,5-Cyclohexatriene (theoretical resonance isomers) [6]Annulene (not recommended); Phene (historic)

Identifiers
| CAS Number | 71-43-2 |
| 3D model (JSmol) | Interactive image |
| ChEBI | CHEBI:16716 |
| ChEMBL | ChEMBL277500 |
| ChemSpider | 236 |
| ECHA InfoCard | 100.000.685 |
| EC Number | 200-753-7 |
| KEGG | C01407 |
| PubChem CID | 241 |
| RTECS number | CY1400000 |
| UNII | J64922108F |
| CompTox Dashboard (EPA) | DTXSID3039242 |
- InChI: InChI=1S/C6H6/c1-2-4-6-5-3-1/h1-6H Key: UHOVQNZJYSORNB-UHFFFAOYSA-N
- SMILES: c1ccccc1

Properties
| Chemical formula | C_{6}H_{6} |
| Molar mass | 78.114 g·mol^{−1} |
| Appearance | Colorless liquid |
| Odor | sweet aromatic |
| Density | 0.8765(20) g/cm^{3} |
| Melting point | 5.53 °C (41.95 °F; 278.68 K) |
| Boiling point | 80.1 °C (176.2 °F; 353.2 K) |
| Critical point (T, P) | 562 K (289 °C), 4.89 MPa |
| Solubility in water | 1.53 g/L (0 °C); 1.81 g/L (9 °C); 1.79 g/L (15 °C); 1.84 g/L (30 °C); 2.26 g/L (61 °C); 3.94 g/L (100 °C); 21.7 g/kg (200 °C, 6.5 MPa); 17.8 g/kg (200 °C, 40 MPa) |
| Solubility | Soluble in alcohol, CHCl_{3}, CCl_{4}, diethyl ether, acetone, acetic acid |
| Solubility in ethanediol | 5.83 g/100 g (20 °C); 6.61 g/100 g (40 °C); 7.61 g/100 g (60 °C) |
| Solubility in diethylene glycol | 52 g/100 g (20 °C) |
| log P | 2.13 |
| Vapor pressure | 12.7 kPa (25 °C); 24.4 kPa (40 °C); 181 kPa (100 °C) |
| Conjugate acid | Benzenium |
| Conjugate base | Benzenide |
| UV-vis (λ_{max}) | 255 nm |
| Magnetic susceptibility (χ) | −54.8·10^{−6} cm^{3}/mol |
| Refractive index (n_{D}) | 1.5011 (20 °C); 1.4948 (30 °C) |
| Viscosity | 0.7528 cP (10 °C); 0.6076 cP (25 °C); 0.4965 cP (40 °C); 0.3075 cP (80 °C) |

Structure
| Molecular shape | Trigonal planar |
| Dipole moment | 0 D |

Thermochemistry
| Heat capacity (C) | 134.8 J/mol·K |
| Std molar entropy (S^{⦵}_{298}) | 173.26 J/mol·K |
| Std enthalpy of formation (Δ_{f}H^{⦵}_{298}) | 48.7 kJ/mol |
| Std enthalpy of combustion (Δ_{c}H^{⦵}_{298}) | −3267.6 kJ/mol |
| Enthalpy of fusion (Δ_{f}H^{⦵}_{fus}) | 9.9 kJ/mol |
| Enthalpy of vaporization (Δ_{f}H_{vap}) | 33.9 kJ/mol |

Hazards
- Occupational safety and health (OHS/OSH)
| Main hazards | potential occupational carcinogen, flammable |
- GHS labelling
| Pictograms | (GHS02: Flammable) (GHS07: Exclamation mark) (GHS08: Health hazard) (GHS09: Environmental hazard) |
| Signal word | Danger |
| Hazard statements | H225, H302, H304, H305, H315, H319, H340, H350, H372, H410 |
| Precautionary statements | P201, P210, P301+P310, P305+P351+P338, P308+P313, P331 |
| NFPA 704 (fire diamond) | 2 3 0 |
| Flash point | −11.63 °C (11.07 °F; 261.52 K) |
| Autoignition temperature | 497.78 °C (928.00 °F; 770.93 K) |
| Explosive limits | 1.2–7.8% |
- Lethal dose or concentration (LD, LC)
| LD_{50} (median dose) | 930 mg/kg (rat, oral) |
| LC_{Lo} (lowest published) | 44,000 ppm (rabbit, 30 min); 44,923 ppm (dog); 52,308 ppm (cat); 20,000 ppm (human, 5 min) |
- NIOSH (US health exposure limits)
| PEL (Permissible) | TWA 1 ppm, ST 5 ppm |
| REL (Recommended) | Ca TWA 0.1 ppm ST 1 ppm |
| IDLH (Immediate danger) | 500 ppm |
| Safety data sheet (SDS) | HMDB |

Related compounds
| Related compounds | Toluene; Borazine |

Supplementary data page
- Benzene (data page)
- Except where otherwise noted, data are given for materials in their standard state (at 25 °C [77 °F], 100 kPa). verify (what is ?) Infobox references

Benzene is an organic chemical compound with the molecular formula C_{6}H_{6}. The benzene molecule is composed of six carbon atoms joined in a planar hexagonal ring with one hydrogen atom attached to each. As it contains only carbon and hydrogen atoms, benzene is a hydrocarbon.

Benzene is a natural constituent of petroleum and is one of the elementary petrochemicals. Because of the cyclic continuous pi bonds between the carbon atoms and satisfying the rules of aromaticity and Hückel's rule, benzene is classed as an aromatic hydrocarbon. Benzene is a colorless and highly flammable liquid with a sweet smell, and is partially responsible for the aroma of gasoline. It is used primarily as a precursor to the manufacture of chemicals with more complex structures, such as ethylbenzene and cumene, of which billions of kilograms are produced annually. Although benzene is a major industrial chemical, it finds limited use in consumer items because of its toxicity. Benzene is a volatile organic compound.

Benzene is classified as a carcinogen. Its particular effects on human health, such as the long-term results of accidental exposure, have been reported on by news organizations such as The New York Times. For instance, a 2022 article stated that benzene contamination in the Boston metropolitan area created hazards in multiple places and may eventually cause some cases of leukemia.

== History ==
=== Discovery ===
The word "benzene" derives from "gum benzoin" (benzoin resin), an aromatic resin known since ancient times in Southeast Asia, and later to European pharmacists and perfumers in the 16th century via trade routes. (Note: The word benzoin is derived from the Arabic expression luban jawi ("frankincense of Java").) An acidic material was derived from benzoin by sublimation, and named "flowers of benzoin", or benzoic acid. The hydrocarbon derived from benzoic acid thus acquired the names benzin, benzol, and benzene. Michael Faraday first isolated and identified benzene in 1825 from the oily residue derived from the production of illuminating gas, giving it the name bicarburet of hydrogen. In 1833, Eilhard Mitscherlich produced it by distilling benzoic acid (from gum benzoin) and lime. He gave the compound the name benzin. In 1836, the French chemist Auguste Laurent named the substance "phène"; this word has become the root of the English word "phenol", which is hydroxylated benzene, and "phenyl", the radical formed by the abstraction of a hydrogen atom from benzene.

In 1845, Charles Blachford Mansfield, working under August Wilhelm von Hofmann, isolated benzene from coal tar. Four years later, Mansfield began the first industrial-scale production of benzene, based on the coal-tar method. (Note: Charles Mansfield filed for (November 11, 1847) and received (May 1848) a patent (no. 11,960) for the fractional distillation of coal tar.) Gradually, the sense developed among chemists that a number of substances were chemically related to benzene, comprising a diverse chemical family. In 1855, Hofmann was the first to apply the word "aromatic" to designate this family relationship, after a characteristic property of many of its members. In 1997, benzene was detected in deep space.

=== Ring formula ===
Historic proposals of benzene structures
| By Adolf Karl Ludwig Claus (1867) | Listed, but not supported, (Note: Dewar included this isomer in a list of possible C6H6 structures in 1869. However, he did not propose it for benzene, and in fact he supported the correct structure proposed by Kekulé. See Dewar benzene.) by James Dewar (1869) | By Albert Ladenburg (1869) |
By Friedrich August Kekulé (1865/1872)
| By Henry Edward Armstrong (1887) (Note: In his 1890 paper, Armstrong represented benzene nuclei within polycyclic benzenoids by placing inside the benzene nuclei a letter "C", an abbreviation of the word "centric". Centric affinities (meaning "bonds") acted within a designated cycle of carbon atoms. From p. 102: " ... benzene, according to this view, may be represented by a double ring, in fact.") The use of a circle to denote a benzene nucleus first appeared in 1925. | By Adolf von Baeyer (1888) | By Friedrich Karl Johannes Thiele (1899) |

The empirical formula for benzene was long known, but its highly polyunsaturated structure, with just one hydrogen atom for each carbon atom, was challenging to determine. Archibald Scott Couper in 1858 and Johann Josef Loschmidt in 1861 suggested possible structures that contained multiple double bonds or multiple rings, but in these years very little was known about aromatic chemistry, and so chemists were unable to adduce appropriate evidence to favor any particular formula.

But many chemists had begun to work on aromatic substances, especially in Germany, and relevant data was coming fast. In 1865, the German chemist Friedrich August Kekulé published a paper in French (for he was then teaching in Francophone Belgium) suggesting that the structure contained a ring of six carbon atoms with alternating single and double bonds. The next year he published a much longer paper in German on the same subject. Kekulé used evidence that had accumulated in the intervening years—namely, that there always appeared to be only one isomer of any monoderivative of benzene, and that there always appeared to be exactly three isomers of every disubstituted derivative—now understood to correspond to the ortho, meta, and para patterns of arene substitution—to argue in support of his proposed structure. Kekulé's symmetrical ring could explain these curious facts, as well as benzene's 1:1 carbon-hydrogen ratio.

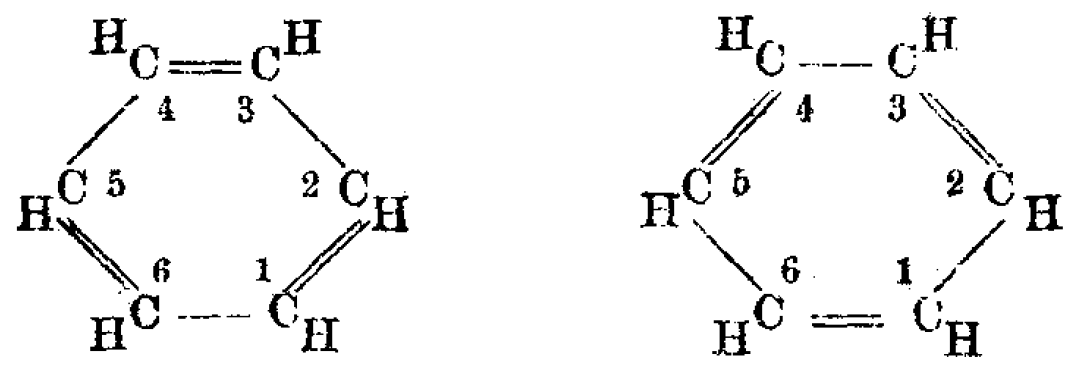
Kekulé's 1872 modification of his 1865 theory, illustrating rapid alternation of double bonds (Note: Critics indicated a problem with Kekulé's original (1865) structure for benzene: Whenever benzene underwent substitution at the ortho position, two distinguishable isomers should have resulted, depending on whether a double bond or a single bond existed between the carbon atoms to which the substituents were attached; however, no such isomers were observed. In 1872, Kekulé suggested that benzene had two complementary structures and that these forms rapidly interconverted, so that if there were a double bond between any pair of carbon atoms at one instant, that double bond would become a single bond at the next instant (and vice versa). To provide a mechanism for the conversion process, Kekulé proposed that the valency of an atom is determined by the frequency with which it collided with its neighbors in a molecule. As the carbon atoms in the benzene ring collided with each other, each carbon atom would collide twice with one neighbor during a given interval and then twice with its other neighbor during the next interval. Thus, a double bond would exist with one neighbor during the first interval and with the other neighbor during the next interval. Therefore, between the carbon atoms of benzene there were no fixed (in other words, constant) and distinct single or double bonds; instead, the bonds between the carbon atoms were identical.)

The new understanding of benzene, and hence of all aromatic compounds, proved to be notable enough for both pure and applied chemistry that, in 1890, the German Chemical Society organized a celebration in Kekulé's honor (named as the "Benzolfest"), celebrating the twenty-fifth anniversary of his first paper on benzene. At Benzolfest, Kekulé discussed the theory's creation, having discovered the ring shape of the benzene molecule after having a reverie (or day-dream) of a snake biting its own tail (a symbol in ancient cultures known as the ouroboros). This vision allegedly appeared to him after years of studying the nature of carbon-carbon bonds, which occurred seven years after he had discovered how carbon atoms could bond to up to four other atoms at the same time. Curiously, a similar, humorous depiction of benzene had appeared in 1886 in a pamphlet entitled Berichte der Durstigen Chemischen Gesellschaft (Journal of the Thirsty Chemical Society), a parody of the Berichte der Deutschen Chemischen Gesellschaft, only the parody had monkeys seizing each other in a circle, rather than snakes as in Kekulé's anecdote. Some historians have suggested that the parody was a lampoon of the snake anecdote, possibly already well known through oral transmission even if it had not yet appeared in print. Kekulé's 1890 speech in which this anecdote appeared has been translated into English. If the anecdote is the memory of a real event, circumstances mentioned in the story suggest that it must have happened early in 1862.

In 1929, the cyclic nature of benzene was finally confirmed by the crystallographer Kathleen Lonsdale using X-ray diffraction methods. Using large crystals of hexamethylbenzene, a benzene derivative with the same core of six carbon atoms, Lonsdale obtained diffraction patterns. Through calculating more than thirty parameters, Lonsdale demonstrated that the benzene ring could not be anything but a flat hexagon, and provided accurate distances for all carbon-carbon bonds in the molecule.

=== Nomenclature ===
The German chemist Wilhelm Körner suggested the prefixes ortho-, meta-, para- to distinguish di-substituted benzene derivatives in 1867; however, he did not use the prefixes to distinguish the relative positions of the substituents on a benzene ring. It was the German chemist Carl Gräbe who, in 1869, first used the prefixes ortho-, meta-, para- to denote specific relative locations of the substituents on a di-substituted aromatic ring (viz, naphthalene). In 1870, the German chemist Viktor Meyer first applied Gräbe's nomenclature to benzene.

=== Early applications ===
In 1903, Ludwig Roselius popularized the use of benzene to decaffeinate coffee. This discovery led to the production of Sanka. However, this process was later discontinued. Benzene was historically used as a significant component in many consumer products such as liquid wrench, several paint strippers, rubber cements, spot removers, and other products. Manufacture of some of these benzene-containing formulations ceased in about 1950, although Liquid Wrench continued to contain significant amounts of benzene until the late 1970s.

=== Occurrence ===
Trace amounts of benzene are found in petroleum and coal. It is a byproduct of the incomplete combustion of many materials. For commercial use, until World War II, much of benzene was obtained as a by-product of coke production (or "coke-oven light oil") for the steel industry. However, in the 1950s, increased demand for benzene, especially from the growing polymers industry, necessitated the production of benzene from petroleum. Today, most benzene comes from the petrochemical industry, with only a small fraction being produced from coal. Benzene has been detected on Mars.

== Structure ==
The various representations of benzene.

X-ray diffraction reveals that benzene is a planar molecule with six-fold rotational symmetry, which is in the symmetry group, $D_{6h}$. The carbon-carbon bond lengths of benzene are 140 picometers (pm) long, which are greater than a C=C double bond (135 pm) but shorter than a C-C single bond (147 pm).

In terms of bonding, the molecular orbital (MO) description involves three bonding pi-MOs. A valence bond description involves a superposition of resonance structures. Its considerable stability and distinctive chemical properties are manifested in the phenomenon of aromaticity. To reflect the delocalized nature of the bonding, benzene is often depicted with a circle inside a hexagonal arrangement of carbon atoms.

The modern Alternating Single and Double bonds/Kekulé structure of Benzene

Derivatives of benzene occur sufficiently often as a component of organic molecules, so much so that the Unicode Consortium has allocated a symbol in the Miscellaneous Technical block, which ranges from U+2300 to U+23FF, with the code U+232C (⌬) to represent it with three alternating double bonds, and U+23E3 (⏣) for a delocalized version.

== Benzene derivatives ==
Many important chemical compounds are derived from benzene by replacing one or more of its hydrogen atoms with another functional group. Examples of simple benzene derivatives are phenol, toluene, and aniline, abbreviated PhOH, PhMe, and PhNH_{2}, respectively. Linking benzene rings gives biphenyl, C_{6}H_{5}–C_{6}H_{5}. Further loss of hydrogen gives "fused" aromatic hydrocarbons, such as naphthalene, anthracene, phenanthrene, and pyrene. The limit of the fusion process is the hydrogen-free allotrope of carbon, graphite.

In heterocycles, carbon atoms in the benzene ring are replaced with other elements. The most important variations contain nitrogen. Replacing one CH with N gives the compound pyridine, C_{5}H_{5}N. Although benzene and pyridine are structurally related, benzene cannot be converted into pyridine. Replacement of a second CH bond with N gives, depending on the location of the second N, pyridazine, pyrimidine, or pyrazine.

== Production ==
Four chemical processes contribute to industrial benzene production: catalytic reforming, toluene hydrodealkylation, toluene disproportionation, and steam cracking etc. According to the ATSDR Toxicological Profile for benzene, between 1978 and 1981, catalytic reformates accounted for approximately 44–50% of the total US benzene production.

=== Catalytic reforming ===
In catalytic reforming, a mixture of hydrocarbons with boiling points between 60 and 200 °C is blended with hydrogen gas and then exposed to a bifunctional platinum chloride or rhenium chloride catalyst at 500–525 °C and pressures ranging from 8–50 atm. Under these conditions, aliphatic hydrocarbons form rings and lose hydrogen to become aromatic hydrocarbons. The aromatic products of the reaction are then separated from the reaction mixture (or reformate) by extraction with any one of a number of solvents, including diethylene glycol or sulfolane, and benzene is then separated from the other aromatics by distillation. The extraction step of aromatics from the reformate is designed to produce aromatics with lowest non-aromatic components. Recovery of the aromatics, commonly referred to as BTX (benzene, toluene and xylene isomers), involves such extraction and distillation steps.

In similar fashion to this catalytic reforming, UOP and BP commercialized a method from LPG (mainly propane and butane) to aromatics.

=== Toluene hydrodealkylation ===
Toluene hydrodealkylation converts toluene to benzene. In this hydrogen-intensive process, toluene is mixed with hydrogen, then passed over a chromium, molybdenum, or platinum oxide catalyst at 500–650 °C and 20–60 atm pressure. Sometimes, higher temperatures are used instead of a catalyst (at the similar reaction condition). Under these conditions, toluene undergoes dealkylation to benzene and methane:

C_{6}H_{5}CH_{3} + H_{2} → C_{6}H_{6} + CH_{4}

This irreversible reaction is accompanied by an equilibrium side reaction that produces biphenyl (diphenyl) at higher temperature:

2 C_{6}H_{6} ⇌ H_{2} + C_{6}H_{5}–C_{6}H_{5}

If the raw material stream contains much non-aromatic components (paraffins or naphthenes), those are likely decomposed to lower hydrocarbons such as methane, which increases the consumption of hydrogen.

A typical reaction yield exceeds 95%. Sometimes, xylenes and heavier aromatics are used in place of toluene, with similar efficiency.

This is often called "on-purpose" methodology to produce benzene, compared to conventional BTX (benzene-toluene-xylene) extraction processes.

=== Toluene disproportionation ===
Toluene disproportionation (TDP) is the conversion of toluene to benzene and xylene.

Given that demand for para-xylene (p-xylene) substantially exceeds demand for other xylene isomers, a refinement of the TDP process called Selective TDP (STDP) may be used. In this process, the xylene stream exiting the TDP unit is approximately 90% p-xylene. In some systems, even the benzene-to-xylenes ratio is modified to favor xylenes.

=== Steam cracking ===
Steam cracking is the process for producing ethylene and other alkenes from aliphatic hydrocarbons. Depending on the feedstock used to produce the olefins, steam cracking can produce a benzene-rich liquid by-product called pyrolysis gasoline. Pyrolysis gasoline can be blended with other hydrocarbons as a gasoline additive, or routed through an extraction process to recover BTX aromatics (benzene, toluene and xylenes).

=== Other methods ===
Although of no commercial significance, many other routes to benzene exist. For example, Phenol and halobenzenes can be reduced with metals. Benzoic acid and its salts undergo decarboxylation to benzene. The reaction of the diazonium compound derived from aniline with hypophosphorus acid gives benzene. Alkyne trimerisation of acetylene gives benzene. Complete decarboxylation of mellitic acid gives benzene.

== Uses ==
Benzene is used mainly as an intermediate to make other chemicals, above all ethylbenzene (and other alkylbenzenes), cumene, cyclohexane, and nitrobenzene. In 1988, it was reported that two-thirds of all chemicals on the American Chemical Society's lists contained at least one benzene ring. More than half of the entire benzene production is processed into ethylbenzene, a precursor to styrene, which is used to make polymers and plastics like polystyrene. Some 20% of the benzene production is used to manufacture cumene, which is needed to produce phenol and acetone for resins and adhesives. Cyclohexane consumes around 10% of the world's benzene production; it is primarily used in the manufacture of nylon fibers, which are processed into textiles and engineering plastics. Smaller amounts of benzene are used to make some types of rubbers, lubricants, dyes, detergents, drugs, explosives, and pesticides. In 2013, the biggest consumer country of benzene was China, followed by the USA. Benzene production is currently expanding in the Middle East and in Africa, whereas production capacities in Western Europe and North America are stagnating.

Toluene is now often used as a substitute for benzene, for instance as a fuel additive. The solvent-properties of the two are similar, but toluene is less toxic and has a wider liquid range. Toluene is also processed into benzene.

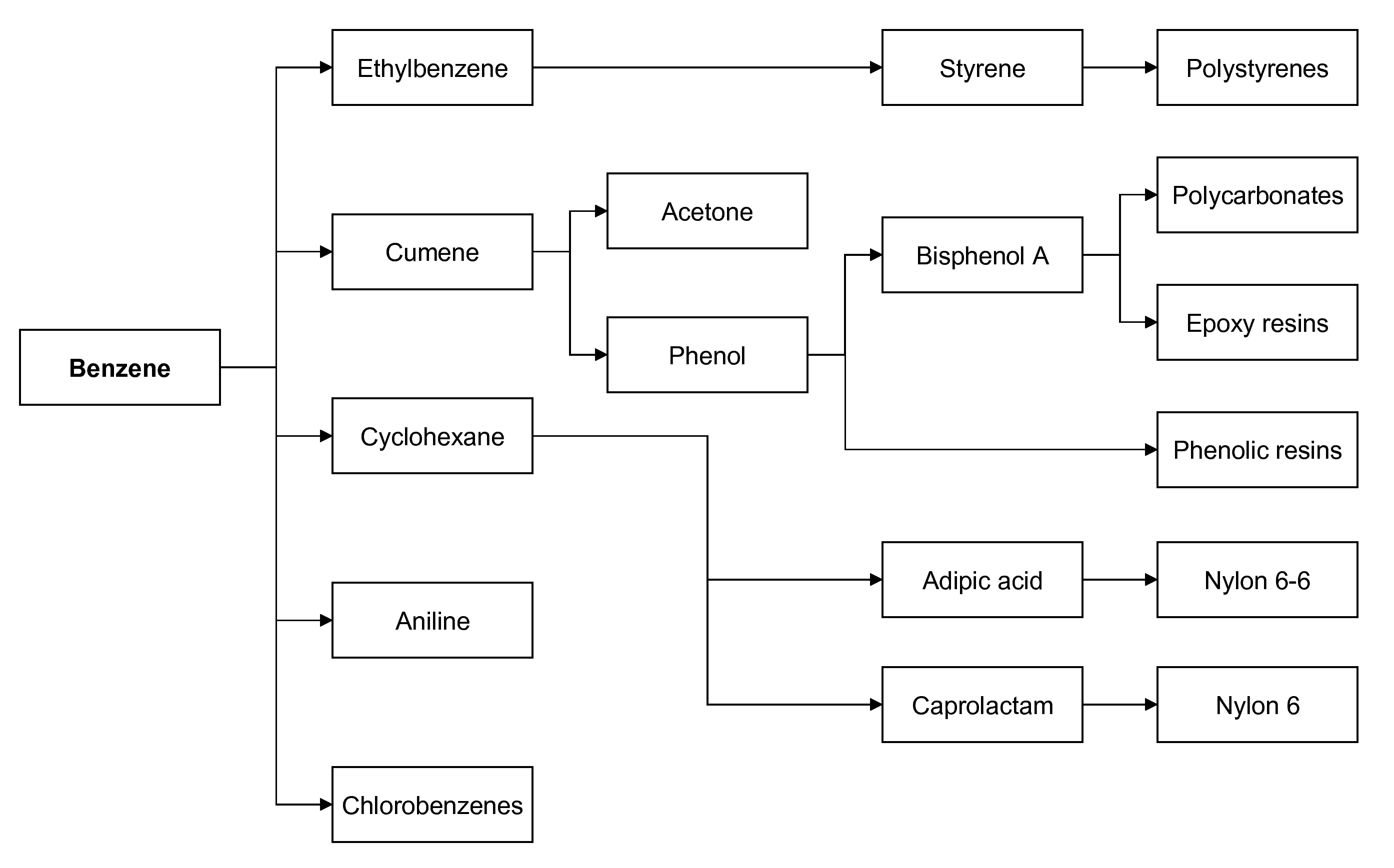
Major commodity chemicals and polymers derived from benzene. Clicking on the image loads the appropriate article

=== Component of gasoline ===
As a gasoline (petrol) additive, benzene increases the octane rating and reduces knocking. As a consequence, gasoline often contained several percent benzene before the 1950s, when tetraethyl lead replaced it as the most widely used antiknock additive. With the global phaseout of leaded gasoline in the 1970s–1990s, benzene reappeared as a gasoline additive, although strictly limited in most nations. For example, in the United States, concern over its negative health effects and the possibility of benzene entering the groundwater has led to stringent regulation of gasoline's benzene content, with limits typically around 1%. European petrol specifications now contain the same 1% limit on benzene content. The United States Environmental Protection Agency introduced new regulations in 2011 that lowered the benzene content in gasoline to 0.62%.

In some European languages, the word for petroleum or gasoline is an exact cognate of "benzene". For instance all Germanic languages and Scandinavian languages refer to gasoline as 'bensin' or 'benzin'. In Turkish and many Turkic languages the word of 'benzin' is used to refer the gasoline. In Catalan and Italian the word 'benzina' can be used for gasoline. In both Polish and Greek the word 'benzyna' is also used to mean gasoline or petrol.

== Reactions ==
Electrophilic aromatic substitution of benzene.

The most common reactions of benzene involve substitution of a proton by other groups. Electrophilic aromatic substitution is a general method of derivatizing benzene. Benzene is sufficiently nucleophilic that it undergoes substitution by acylium ions and alkyl carbocations to give substituted derivatives.

The most widely practiced example of this reaction is the ethylation of benzene.

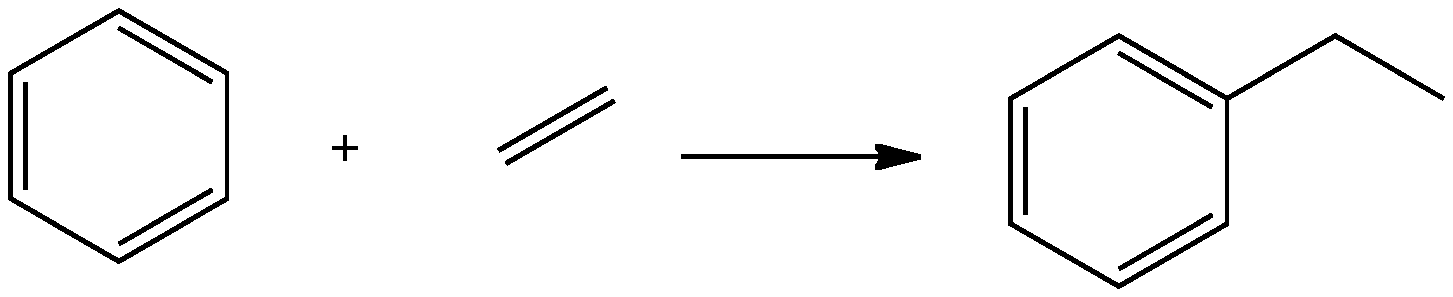

Approximately 24,700,000 tons of ethylbenzene were produced in 1999. Highly instructive but of far less industrial significance is the Friedel-Crafts alkylation of benzene (and many other aromatic rings) using an alkyl halide in the presence of a strong Lewis acid catalyst. Similarly, the Friedel-Crafts acylation is a related example of electrophilic aromatic substitution. The reaction involves the acylation of benzene (or many other aromatic rings) with an acyl chloride using a strong Lewis acid catalyst such as aluminium chloride or Iron(III) chloride.

Examples of electrophilic aromatic substitution.

=== Sulfonation, chlorination, nitration ===
Using electrophilic aromatic substitution, many functional groups are introduced onto the benzene framework. Sulfonation of benzene involves the use of oleum, a mixture of sulfuric acid with sulfur trioxide. Sulfonated benzene derivatives are useful detergents. In nitration, benzene reacts with nitronium ions (NO_{2}^{+}), which is a strong electrophile produced by combining sulfuric and nitric acids. Nitrobenzene is the precursor to aniline. Chlorination is achieved with chlorine to produce chlorobenzene in the presence of a Lewis acid catalyst such as aluminium chloride.

=== Hydrogenation ===
Hydrogenation is achieved by introducing hydrogen to the unsaturated compounds under high pressure in the presence of heterogeneous catalysts, such as finely divided nickel. This reaction converts benzene into cyclohexane. Benzene derivatives are also converted into their respective saturated equivalents. Whereas alkenes can be hydrogenated near room temperatures, benzene and its derivatives are more reluctant substrates, requiring temperatures exceeding 100 °C for hydrogenation to occur. This reaction is practiced on an industrial scale. Typically, benzene is fully saturated into cyclohexane during hydrogenation. However, with the right conditions, benzene can be partially-hydrogenated to give cyclohexene or cyclohexadienes. A similar reaction is the Birch reduction, which is a non-catalytic process that converts benzene into cyclohexadiene.

=== Metal complexes ===
Benzene is an excellent ligand in the organometallic chemistry of low-valent metals. Complexes containing benzene include the sandwich complex Cr(C_{6}H_{6})_{2} as well as the half-sandwich complex [RuCl_{2}(C_{6}H_{6})]_{2}.

== Health effects ==
=== Toxicity ===
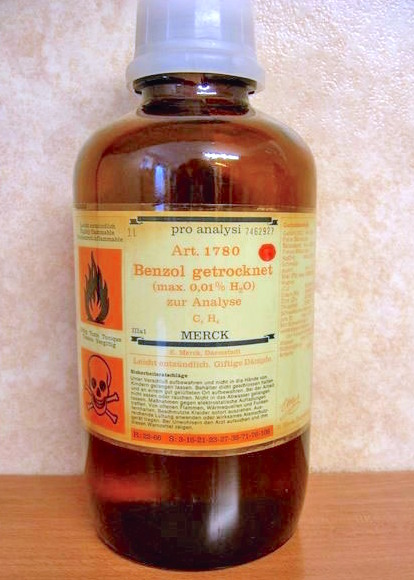
A bottle of benzene. The warnings show that benzene is a toxic and flammable liquid.

Inhalation of benzene at concentrations of 20,000 ppm for 5–10 min can result in death, and levels of 300–3,000 ppm can cause drowsiness, dizziness, headache, tremor, delirium, and unconsciousness.

Benzene is classified as a carcinogen, which means that it promotes development of cancer in humans and in animals. It can also cause other illnesses, such as bone marrow failure. Substantial quantities of epidemiologic, clinical, and laboratory data link benzene to aplastic anemia, acute leukemia, multiple myeloma, bone marrow abnormalities and cardiovascular disease. The specific hematologic malignancies that benzene is associated with include: acute myeloid leukemia (AML), aplastic anemia, myelodysplastic syndrome (MDS), acute lymphoblastic leukemia (ALL), and chronic myeloid leukemia (CML). Benzene targets the liver, kidneys, lungs, heart and brain and can cause DNA strand breaks and chromosomal damage. Benzene has been shown to cause cancer in both sexes of multiple species of laboratory animals exposed via various routes.

There is likely no safe level of exposure to benzene and all exposures constitute risk in a linear and additive fashion.

IARC rated benzene as "known to be carcinogenic to humans" (Group 1). The US Department of Health and Human Services (DHHS) classifies benzene as a human carcinogen.

==== Toxicity history ====
Chronic poisoning by benzene was first reported in 1897 by Swedish pharmacologist C. G. Santesson who reported that female workers of a tire-making factory exhibited serious blood-clotting problems, which was likely aplastic anemia.

The American Petroleum Institute (API) stated in 1948 that "it is generally considered that the only absolutely safe concentration for benzene is zero".

Nazi Germany used benzene administered via injection as one of their many methods for killing.

=== Kinetics and elimination ===
Inhaled benzene is primarily expelled unchanged through exhalation. In a human study, 16.4 to 41.6% of retained benzene was eliminated through the lungs within five to seven hours after a two- to three-hour exposure to 47 to 110 ppm and only 0.07 to 0.2% of the remaining benzene was excreted unchanged in the urine. After exposure to 63 to 405 mg/m^{3} of benzene for 1 to 5 hours, 51 to 87% was excreted in the urine as phenol over a period of 23 to 50 hours. In another human study, 30% of absorbed dermally applied benzene, which is primarily metabolized in the liver, was excreted as phenol in the urine.

=== Routes of exposure ===
As benzene is ubiquitous in gasoline and hydrocarbon fuels that are in use everywhere, human exposure to benzene is a global health problem.

According to the Agency for Toxic Substances and Disease Registry, benzene is both a synthetically made and naturally occurring chemical from processes that include: volcanic eruptions, wild fires, synthesis of chemicals such as phenol, production of synthetic fibers, and fabrication of rubbers, lubricants, pesticides, medications, and dyes. The major sources of benzene exposure are tobacco smoke, automobile service stations, exhaust from motor vehicles, and industrial emissions; however, ingestion and dermal absorption of benzene can also occur through contact with contaminated water. Among those in the United States who are exposed to benzene, over half of the known exposures occur due to tobacco smoking. Measurement of air and water levels of benzene is accomplished through collection via activated charcoal tubes, which are then analyzed with a gas chromatograph. The measurement of benzene in humans can be accomplished via urine, blood, and breath tests; however, all of these have their limitations because benzene is rapidly metabolized in the human body.

==== Inhalation ====
Outdoor air may contain low levels of benzene from automobile service stations, wood smoke, tobacco smoke, the transfer of gasoline, exhaust from motor vehicles, and industrial emissions. About 50% of the entire nationwide (United States) exposure to benzene results from smoking tobacco or from exposure to tobacco smoke. After smoking 32 cigarettes per day, the smoker would take in about 1.8 mg of benzene. This amount is about 10 times the average daily intake of benzene by nonsmokers.

==== Drinking water ====
In 2005, the water supply to the city of Harbin in China with a population of almost nine million people, was cut off because of a major benzene exposure. Benzene leaked into the Songhua River, which supplies drinking water to the city, after an explosion at a China National Petroleum Corporation (CNPC) factory in the city of Jilin on 13 November 2005.

When plastic water pipes are subject to high heat, the water may be contaminated with benzene.

==== Soft drinks ====
Under specific conditions and in the presence of other chemicals benzoic acid (a preservative) and ascorbic acid (Vitamin C) may interact to produce benzene. In March 2006, the official Food Standards Agency in United Kingdom conducted a survey of 150 brands of soft drinks. It found that four contained benzene levels above World Health Organization limits. The affected batches were removed from sale. Similar problems were reported by the US Food & Drug Administration.

=== Regulatory limits ===
==== Workplace air ====
Occupational Safety and Health Administration regulates levels of benzene in the workplace. The maximum allowable amount of benzene in workroom air during an 8-hour workday, 40-hour workweek is 1 ppm. As benzene can cause cancer, National Institute for Occupational Safety and Health recommends that all workers wear special breathing equipment when they are likely to be exposed to benzene at levels exceeding the recommended (8-hour) exposure limit of 0.1 ppm. According to Occupational Safety and Health Administration's Supporting Statement for the Information Collection Request for the Benzene standard, an estimated 12,270 establishments are subject to the requirements of the standard.

The US Occupational Safety and Health Administration (OSHA) has set a permissible exposure limit of 1 part of benzene per million parts of air (1 ppm) in the workplace during an 8-hour workday, 40-hour workweek. The short term exposure limit for airborne benzene is 5 ppm for 15 minutes. These legal limits were based on studies demonstrating compelling evidence of health risk to workers exposed to benzene. The risk from exposure to 1 ppm for a working lifetime has been estimated as 5 excess leukemia deaths per 1,000 employees exposed. (This estimate assumes no threshold for benzene's carcinogenic effects.) OSHA has also established an action level of 0.5 ppm to encourage even lower exposures in the workplace.

The US National Institute for Occupational Safety and Health (NIOSH) revised the Immediately Dangerous to Life and Health (IDLH) concentration for benzene to 500 ppm. The current NIOSH definition for an IDLH condition, as given in the NIOSH Respirator Selection Logic, is one that poses a threat of exposure to airborne contaminants when that exposure is likely to cause death or immediate or delayed permanent adverse health effects or prevent escape from such an environment. The purpose of establishing an IDLH value is (1) to ensure that the worker can escape from a given contaminated environment in the event of failure of the respiratory protection equipment and (2) is considered a maximum level above which only a highly reliable breathing apparatus providing maximum worker protection is permitted. In September 1995, NIOSH issued a new policy for developing recommended exposure limits (RELs) for substances, including carcinogens. As benzene can cause cancer, NIOSH recommends that all workers wear special breathing equipment when they are likely to be exposed to benzene at levels exceeding the REL (10-hour) of 0.1 ppm. The NIOSH short-term exposure limit (STEL – 15 min) is 1 ppm.

American Conference of Governmental Industrial Hygienists (ACGIH) adopted Threshold Limit Values (TLVs) for benzene at 0.02 ppm TWA in 2024.

The European Union exposure limit value for benzene is 0.66 mg/m^{3}. Germany's acceptable concentration (AC) is 0.2 mg/m^{3} and tolerable concentration (TC) is 1.9 mg/m^{3}, where 1 mg/m^{3} is about 1 ppm in air.

==== Drinking water limits ====
The United States Environmental Protection Agency has set a maximum contaminant level for benzene in drinking water at 0.005 mg/L (5 ppb), as promulgated via the US National Primary Drinking Water Regulations. This regulation is based on preventing benzene leukemogenesis. The maximum contaminant level goal (MCLG), a nonenforceable health goal that would allow an adequate margin of safety for the prevention of adverse effects, is zero benzene concentration in drinking water. The EPA requires that spills or accidental releases into the environment of 10 pounds (4.5 kg) or more of benzene be reported.

=== Metabolism and biotransformations ===
Even if it is not a common substrate for metabolism, benzene can be oxidized by both bacteria and eukaryotes. In bacteria, dioxygenase enzyme can add an oxygen to the ring, and the unstable product is immediately reduced (by NADH) to a cyclic diol with two double bonds, breaking the aromaticity. Next, the diol is newly reduced by NADH to catechol. The catechol is then metabolized to acetyl CoA and succinyl CoA, used by organisms mainly in the citric acid cycle for energy production.

==== Metabolism in humans ====
Human metabolism of benzene is complex and begins in the liver. Several enzymes are involved, including cytochrome P450 2E1 (CYP2E1), quinine oxidoreductase (NQ01 or DT-diaphorase or NAD(P)H dehydrogenase (quinone 1)), and myeloperoxidase (MPO). GSH (Glutathione), while not an enzyme (as it is a tripeptide), is also involved in the detoxifying process. The enzyme CYP2E1 is involved at multiple steps by converting benzene to oxepin (benzene oxide), phenol to hydroquinone, and hydroquinone to both benzenetriol and catechol. Hydroquinone, benzenetriol and catechol are then converted to polyphenols. In the bone marrow, MPO converts these polyphenols to benzoquinones. These intermediates and metabolites induce genotoxicity by multiple mechanisms, such as the inhibition of topoisomerase II (which maintains chromosome structure), disruption of microtubules (which maintains cellular structure and organization), generation of oxygen free radicals (unstable species) that may lead to point mutations, increasing oxidative stress, inducing DNA strand breaks, and altering DNA methylation (which can affect gene expression). NQ01 and GSH shift metabolism away from toxicity. NQ01 metabolizes benzoquinone toward polyphenols (counteracting the effect of MPO). GSH is also involved with the formation of phenylmercapturic acid.

Genetic polymorphisms in these enzymes may induce a loss or gain of function, such as mutations in CYP2E1, which may increase activity and result in the increased generation of toxic metabolites. Mutations of NQ01, myeloperoxidase and GSH may result in a loss of function. For example, NQ01 mutations may result in decreased detoxification, while myeloperoxidase mutations may result in the decreased generation of toxic metabolites. GSH mutations or deletions may result in decreased detoxification. These genes may be targets in genetic screening for susceptibility to benzene toxicity.

Benzene metabolism involves enzymes coded for by polymorphic genes. Studies have shown that genotype at these loci may influence susceptibility to the toxic effects of benzene exposure. Individuals carrying variant of NAD(P)H:quinone oxidoreductase 1 (NQO1), microsomal epoxide hydrolase (EPHX) and deletion of the glutathione S-transferase T1 (GSTT1) showed a greater frequency of DNA single-stranded breaks.

==== Biomarkers for monitoring exposure ====
Several tests can determine exposure to benzene. Benzene itself can be measured in breath, blood, or urine, however such testing is usually limited to the first 24 hours post-exposure due to the relatively rapid removal of the chemical by exhalation or biotransformation. The majority of people in developed countries have measurable baseline levels of benzene and other aromatic petroleum hydrocarbons in their blood. In the body, benzene is enzymatically converted to a series of oxidation products including muconic acid, phenylmercapturic acid, phenol, catechol, hydroquinone and 1,2,4-trihydroxybenzene. Most of these metabolites have some value as biomarkers of human exposure, since they accumulate in the urine in proportion to the extent and duration of exposure, and they may still be present for some days after exposure has ceased. The current ACGIH biological exposure limits for occupational exposure are 500 μg/g creatinine for muconic acid and 25 μg/g creatinine for phenylmercapturic acid in an end-of-shift urine specimen.

Glutathione seems to play an important role by protecting against benzene-induced DNA breaks and it is being identified as a new biomarker for exposure and effect. Benzene causes chromosomal aberrations in the peripheral blood leukocytes and bone marrow explaining the higher incidence of leukemia and multiple myeloma caused by chronic exposure. These aberrations can be monitored using fluorescent in situ hybridization (FISH) with DNA probes to assess the effects of benzene along with the hematological tests as markers of hematotoxicity.

== See also ==
- Industrial Union Department v. American Petroleum Institute
- Six-membered aromatic rings with one carbon replaced by another element: borabenzene, silabenzene, germabenzene, stannabenzene, pyridine, phosphorine, arsabenzene, stibabenzene, bismabenzene, pyrylium, thiopyrylium, selenopyrylium, telluropyrylium
