= Catechol 1,2-dioxygenase =

Enzyme

Catechol 1,2-Dioxygenase
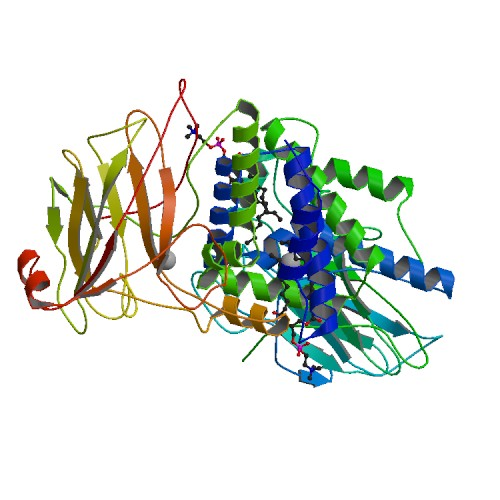

Identifiers
- EC no.: 1.13.11.1
- CAS no.: 9027-16-1

Databases
- BRENDA: enzyme data
- ExPASy: NiceZyme view
- KEGG: enzyme entry
- MetaCyc: metabolic pathway
- Rhea: reactions
- PDB structures: RCSB PDB PDBe PDBsum
- Gene Ontology: AmiGO / QuickGO
Search
- PMC: articles
- PubMed: articles
- NCBI: proteins

Catechol 1,2- dioxygenase (EC 1.13.11.1, 1,2-CTD, catechol-oxygen 1,2-oxidoreductase, 1,2-pyrocatechase, catechase, catechol 1,2-oxygenase, catechol dioxygenase, pyrocatechase, pyrocatechol 1,2-dioxygenase, CD I, CD II) is an enzyme that catalyzes the oxidative ring cleavage of catechol to form cis,cis-muconic acid:

Figure 1. The overall reaction of catechol 1,2-dioxygenase. Using a non-heme iron(III) complex, 1,2-CTD is able to oxidatively cleave catechol into cis,cis-muconic acid.

More specifically, 1,2-CTD is an intradiol dioxygenase, a family of catechol dioxygenases that cleaves the bond between the phenolic hydroxyl groups of catechol using an Fe^{3+} cofactor.

Thus far, 1,2-CTD has been observed to exist in the following species of soil bacteria and fungi: Pseudomonas sp., Pseudomonas fluorescens, Aspergillus niger, Brevibacterium fuscum, Acinetobacter calcoaceticus, Trichosporon cutaneum, Rhodococcus erythropolis, Frateuria sp., Rhizobium trifolii, Pseudomonas putida, Candida tropicalis, Candida maltose, Rhizobium leguminosarum, and Nocardia sp.. These bacteria subsequently employ 1,2-CTD in the last step of the degradation of aromatic compounds to aliphatic products.

The substrate spectrum is (highly specific for catechol, broad substrate specificity, no activity with: 4-nitrocatechol, alpha-chloro-3,4-dihydroxy-acetophenone, 3,4-dihydroxycinnamic acid, protocatechuic acid, protocatechualdehyde, enzyme intermediates), 3-Butylcatechol + O2 (weak activity), 4-Ethylcatechol + O2, Benzoate + O2, 3-(Methylthio)catechol + O2 (weak activity), 3-Ethylcatechol + O2 (at 6% the rate of catechol oxidation), 1,2,3-Trihydroxybenzene + O2, 4-Flurocatechol, Pyrogallol + O2 (weak activity), Hydroxyquinol + O2 (higher activity towards catechol), 4-Chlorocatechol + O2 (low activity), 3-Chlorocatechol + O2, 3-Isopropylcatechol, 3-Methylcatechol + O2 (low activity, extradiol cleavage in addition to intradiol fission at a ratio 1:14 with pyrocatechase I, not with pyrocatechase II, no extradiol cleavage, CD I: ratio of intradiol to extradiol cleavage is 100:120), 4-Methylcatechol + O2, and Catechol + O2.

== History ==
Two families of dioxygenases were discovered by Osamu Hayaishi and Kizo Hashimoto in 1950: catechol 1,2-dioxygenase and catechol 2,3-dioxygenase (2,3-CTD). The two enzymes were identified to be a part of two separate catechol dioxygenase families: 1,2-CTD was classified as an intradiol dioxygenase while 2,3-CTD was classified as an extradiol dioxygenase. The two enzymes can be distinguished based on their reaction products and cofactors. 1,2-CTD uses Fe^{3+} as a cofactor to cleave the carbon-carbon bond between the phenolic hydroxyl groups of catechol, thus yielding muconic acid as its product. In contrast, 2,3-CTD utilizes Fe^{2+} as a cofactor to cleave the carbon-carbon bond adjacent to the phenolic hydroxyl groups of catechol, thus yielding 2-hydroxymuconaldehye as its product.

== Enzyme Structure ==
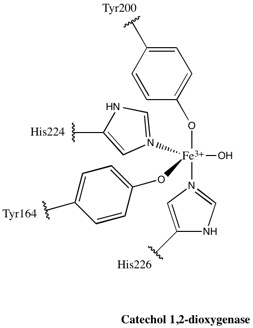
Figure 2. The active site of 1,2-CTD. This non-heme Fe^{3+} complex is axially ligated by Tyr200 and His226 and equatorially ligated by Tyr164, His224, and a solvent water molecule, giving the active site an overall trigonal bipyramidal geometry

Almost all members of the 1,2-CTD family are homodimers; the 1,2-CTD enzyme produced by Pseudomonas arvilla is the exception to this rule, containing two highly homologous subunits that can form either a homo- or hetero- dimer. The enzyme resembles a boomerang in shape, and can therefore be clearly divided into three domains: two catalytic domains residing at each end of the “boomerang” and a linker domain at the center.

Each catalytic domain is composed of two stacked, mixed topology β sheets and several random coils. These sheets and coils subsequently encompass the active site: a non-heme iron(III) complex. Without heme, iron must be ligated to four amino acid residues (Tyr200, His226, Tyr164, His224) to maintain is catalytically active conformation. With Tyr200 and His226 acting as the axial ligands and Tyr164, His224, and a solvent water molecule acting as equatorial ligands, the Fe^{3+} complex displays trigonal bipyramidal geometry. Since the active sites of each catalytic domain are separated by a distance of 40 Å, they are not believed to allosterically effect one another.

In contrast, the linker domain is composed of α helices supplied by the two catalytic domains: each domain contributes five helices from their N termini and one from a helix that spans both the catalytic domain and the linker domain. At the center of the linker domain resides an 8 by 35 Å hydrophobic tunnel with two phospholipids bound at each end. The head of each phospholipid points outward towards solution while the tails are embedded within the enzyme. The function of this hydrophobic tunnel is unknown, though two hypotheses have been postulated concerning its utility. The first is that the binding of the terminal phospholipids alters the conformation of the active sites, implying that the tunnel acts as an effector, only allowing the enzyme to be active in certain areas of the cell. The second hypothesis postulates that the tunnel regulates lipid membrane rigidity through its degradation of phenolic hydrocarbons and ability to bind to other lipids. Studies have shown that phenolic hydrocarbons affect the functional and structural properties of cell membranes. 1,2-CTD degrades phenolic hydrocarbons key to the synthesis lipid membranes. Therefore, 1,2-CTD may bind to the cell lipid membrane via its terminal phospholipids and thus have greater access to the phenolic hydrocarbons vital in lipid membrane structure.

== Enzyme Mechanism ==
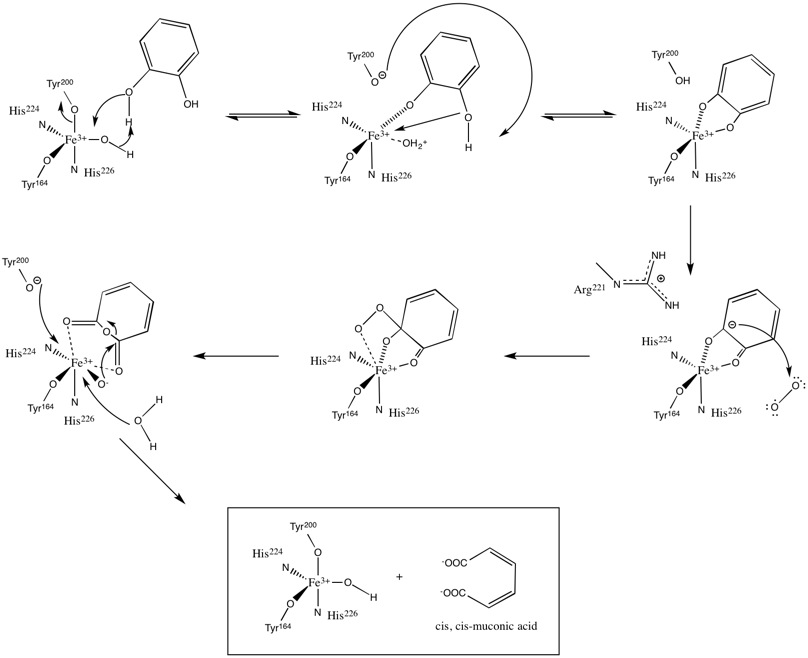
Figure 3. The mechanism by which 1,2-CTD utilizes a non-heme Fe^{3+} complex to oxidatively cleave catechol to form cis,cis-muconic acid.

The catalytic mechanism of catechol 1,2-dioxygenase was elucidated using a combination of O^{18} labeling experiments and crystallography. Upon entering the active site, the hydroxyl group on the fourth carbon (C4) of catechol binds to Fe^{3+}; this binding is facilitated by the hydroxide ligand, which deprotonates the C4 hydroxyl group. The second catechol hydroxyl group on carbon 3 (C3) is coordinated to Fe^{3+} after its deprotonation by the Tyr200 ligand. In the process of deprotonating the C3 hydroxyl group, Tyr200 dissociates from the catalytic complex.

Oxygen is bonded to the substrate through a series of trans influences and stabilizing hydrogen bonding between the substrate and other active site amino acid residues. His226 accepts electron density from the substrate, consequently decreasing the bond between Fe^{3+} and the C4 hydroxyl. At the same time the bond between the C3 hydroxyl and Fe^{3+} is increased due to the electron withdrawing effects of Tyr164. These distortions, coupled with the hydrogen bonding between Arg221 and the C3 hydroxyl, induces the C3 hydroxyl group to ketonize and increases the carbanion character of C4. The newly formed C4 carbanion attacks O2, thus binding it to the substrate.

Another trans influence follows the aforementioned step, leading to the cleavage of O_{2} and the subsequent insertion of one of the oxygen molecules between C3 and C4. Rapid hydrolysis follows this reaction, yielding a primed active site and product.
