= FAD reductase (NADH) =

Identifiers
- EC no.: 1.5.1.37

Databases
- IntEnz: IntEnz view
- BRENDA: BRENDA entry
- ExPASy: NiceZyme view
- KEGG: KEGG entry
- MetaCyc: metabolic pathway
- PRIAM: profile
- PDB structures: RCSB PDB PDBe PDBsum
Search
- PMC: articles
- PubMed: articles
- NCBI: proteins

FAD reductase (NADH) (EC 1.5.1.37, NADH-FAD reductase, NADH-dependent FAD reductase) is an enzyme with systematic name FADH_{2}:NAD^{+} oxidoreductase. This enzyme catalyses the following chemical reaction

FADH_{2} + NAD^{+} $\rightleftharpoons$ FAD + NADH + H^{+}

The enzyme from Burkholderia phenoliruptrix has a preference for FAD.
