= Catechol dioxygenase =

Type of enzyme

Catechol dioxygenases are metalloprotein enzymes that carry out the oxidative cleavage of catechols. This class of enzymes incorporate dioxygen into the substrate. Catechol dioxygenases belong to the class of oxidoreductases and have several different substrate specificities, including catechol 1,2-dioxygenase (EC 1.13.11.1), catechol 2,3-dioxygenase (EC 1.13.11.2), and protocatechuate 3,4-dioxygenase (EC 1.13.11.3). The active site of catechol dioxygenases most frequently contains iron, but manganese-containing forms are also known.

The Pseudomonas putida xylE gene, which encodes catechol 2,3-dioxygenase, is often used as a reporter to quantitate gene expression.

An example of the reaction carried out by catechol 1,2-dioxygenase is the formation of cis,cis-muconic acid from catechol, shown below.

== See also ==
- Bioinorganic chemistry
- Oxygenase
