= Benzene (data page) =

Chemical data page

This page provides supplementary chemical data on benzene.

== Material Safety Data Sheet ==
The handling of this chemical may incur notable safety precautions. It is highly recommended to seek the Material Safety Datasheet (MSDS) for this chemical from a reliable source such as SIRI, and follow its directions. MSDS for benzene is available at AMOCO.

== Structure and properties ==
Structure and properties
Abbe number
?
Dielectric constant, ε_{r}
(2.274 – 0.0020ΔT) ε_{0}
(ΔT = T – 25 °C)
Bond energy
?
Bond length
1.39 Å C-C
Molecular geometry
120 °C–C–C
120° H–C–C
Surface tension
28.88 dyn/cm at 25 °C
Viscosity

| 0.7528 mPa·s | at 10 °C |
| 0.6999 mPa·s | at 15 °C |
| 0.6516 mPa·s | at 20 °C |
| 0.6076 mPa·s | at 25 °C |
| 0.5673 mPa·s | at 35 °C |
| 0.4965 mPa·s | at 40 °C |
| 0.4655 mPa·s | at 45 °C |
| 0.4370 mPa·s | at 50 °C |
| 0.4108 mPa·s | at 55 °C |
| 0.3867 mPa·s | at 60 °C |
| 0.3644 mPa·s | at 65 °C |
| 0.3439 mPa·s | at 70 °C |
| 0.3250 mPa·s | at 75 °C |
| 0.3075 mPa·s | at 80 °C |

== Thermodynamic properties ==
Phase behavior
| Triple point | 278.5 K (5.4 °C), 4.83 kPa |
| Std entropy change of fusion, Δ_{fus}S^{~~o~~} | 35.5 J/(mol·K) at 5.42 °C |
| Std enthalpy change of vaporization, Δ_{vap}H^{~~o~~} | 33.9 kJ/mol at 25 °C; 30.77 kJ/mol at 80.1 °C |
| Std entropy change of vaporization, Δ_{vap}S^{~~o~~} | 113.6 J/(mol·K) at 25 °C; 87.1 J/(mol·K) at 80.1 °C |
Solid properties
| Standard molar entropy, S^{~~o~~}_{solid} | 45.56 J/(mol K) |
| Heat capacity, c_{p} | 118.4 J/(mol K) at 0 °C |
Liquid properties
| Std enthalpy change of formation, Δ_{f}H^{~~o~~}_{liquid} | +48.7 kJ/mol |
| Standard molar entropy, S^{~~o~~}_{liquid} | 173.26 J/(mol K) |
| Enthalpy of combustion, Δ_{c}H^{~~o~~} | –3273 kJ/mol |
| Heat capacity, c_{p} | 134.8 J/(mol K) |
Gas properties
| Std enthalpy change of formation, Δ_{f}H^{~~o~~}_{gas} | +82.93 kJ/mol |
| Standard molar entropy, S^{~~o~~}_{gas} | 269.01 J/(mol K) |
| Heat capacity, c_{p} | 82.44 J/(mol K) at 25 °C |
| van der Waals' constants | a = 1823.9 L^{2} kPa/mol^{2} b = 0.1154 liter per mole |

== Vapor pressure of liquid ==
| P in mm Hg | 1 | 10 | 40 | 100 | 400 | 760 | 1520 | 3800 | 7600 | 15200 | 30400 | 45600 |
| T in °C | –36.7_{(s)} | –11.5_{(s)} | 7.6 | 26.1 | 60.6 | 80.1 | 103.8 | 142.5 | 178.8 | 221.5 | 272.3 | — |

Table data obtained from CRC Handbook of Chemistry and Physics 44th ed. Note: (s) notation indicates equilibrium temperature of vapor over solid, otherwise value is equilibrium temperature of vapor over liquid.

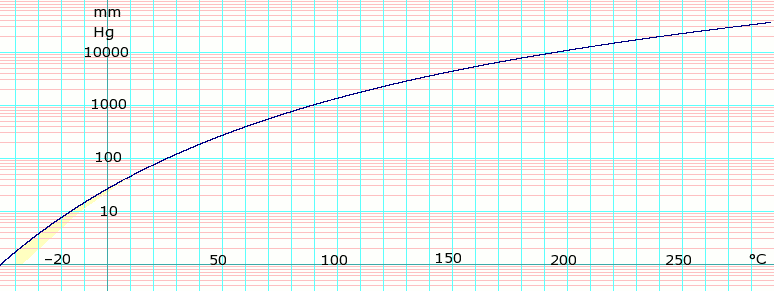
log of Benzene vapor pressure. Uses formula: $\scriptstyle \log_e P_{mmHg} =$$\scriptstyle \log_e (\frac {760} {101.325}) - 8.433613\log_e(T+273.15) - \frac {6281.040} {T+273.15} + 71.10718 + 6.198413 \times 10^{-06} (T+273.15)^2$ obtained from CHERIC Note: yellow area is the region where the formula disagrees with tabulated data above.

== Distillation data ==
Vapor-liquid Equilibrium for Benzene/Ethanol; P = 760 mm Hg
| BP Temp. °C | % by mole ethanol |
| BP Temp. °C | liquid | vapor |
| 70.8 | 8.6 | 26.5 |
| 69.8 | 11.2 | 28.2 |
| 69.6 | 12.0 | 30.8 |
| 69.1 | 15.8 | 33.5 |
| 68.5 | 20.0 | 36.8 |
| 67.7 | 30.8 | 41.0 |
| 67.7 | 44.2 | 44.6 |
| 68.1 | 60.4 | 50.5 |
| 69.6 | 77.0 | 59.0 |
| 70.4 | 81.5 | 62.8 |
| 70.9 | 84.1 | 66.5 |
| 72.7 | 89.8 | 74.4 |
| 73.8 | 92.4 | 78.2 |

Vapor-liquid Equilibrium for Benzene/Methanol; P = 760 mm Hg
| BP Temp. °C | % by mole methanol |
| BP Temp. °C | liquid | vapor |
| 70.67 | 2.6 | 26.7 |
| 66.44 | 5.0 | 37.1 |
| 62.87 | 8.8 | 45.7 |
| 60.20 | 16.4 | 52.6 |
| 58.64 | 33.3 | 55.9 |
| 58.02 | 54.9 | 59.5 |
| 58.10 | 69.9 | 63.3 |
| 58.47 | 78.2 | 66.5 |
| 59.90 | 89.8 | 76.0 |
| 62.71 | 97.3 | 90.7 |

Vapor-liquid Equilibrium for Benzene/Acetone; P = 101.325 kPa
| BP Temp. °C | % by mole benzene |
| BP Temp. °C | liquid | vapor |
| 57.34 | 11.7 | 7.4 |
| 57.48 | 12.8 | 8.1 |
| 57.75 | 15.1 | 9.5 |
| 59.21 | 26.7 | 16.6 |
| 59.24 | 27.0 | 16.7 |
| 60.01 | 32.7 | 20.2 |
| 60.71 | 37.3 | 23.1 |
| 61.05 | 39.8 | 24.7 |
| 61.91 | 45.0 | 27.9 |
| 62.82 | 50.2 | 31.7 |
| 63.39 | 53.4 | 33.9 |
| 63.79 | 55.4 | 35.3 |
| 64.22 | 57.2 | 37.0 |
| 64.99 | 61.3 | 39.9 |
| 67.88 | 73.0 | 51.2 |
| 70.21 | 80.7 | 60.1 |
| 72.23 | 86.1 | 67.9 |

Vapor-liquid Equilibrium for Benzene/n-Hexane; P = 760 mmHg
| BP Temp. °C | % by mole hexane |
| BP Temp. °C | liquid | vapor |
| 77.6 | 7.3 | 14.0 |
| 75.1 | 17.2 | 26.8 |
| 73.4 | 26.8 | 37.6 |
| 72.0 | 37.2 | 46.0 |
| 70.9 | 46.2 | 54.0 |
| 70.0 | 58.5 | 64.4 |
| 69.4 | 69.2 | 72.5 |
| 69.1 | 79.2 | 80.7 |
| 69.0 | 82.8 | 83.8 |
| 68.9 | 88.3 | 88.8 |
| 68.8 | 94.7 | 95.0 |
| 68.8 | 96.2 | 96.4 |

== Spectral data ==
UV-Vis
Ionization potential
9.24 eV (74525.6 cm^{−1})
S_{1}
4.75 eV (38311.3 cm^{−1})
S_{2}
6.05 eV (48796.5 cm^{−1})
λ_{max}
255 nm
Extinction coefficient, ε
?
IR
Major absorption bands

(liquid film)
| Wave number | transmittance |
| 3091 cm^{−1} | 42% |
| 3072 cm^{−1} | 49% |
| 3036 cm^{−1} | 27% |
| 1961 cm^{−1} | 77% |
| 1815 cm^{−1} | 70% |
| 1526 cm^{−1} | 81% |
| 1479 cm^{−1} | 20% |
| 1393 cm^{−1} | 84% |
| 1176 cm^{−1} | 86% |
| 1038 cm^{−1} | 49% |
| 674 cm^{−1} | 4% |

NMR
Proton NMR
(CDCl_{3}, 300 MHz) δ 7.34 (s, 6H)
Carbon-13 NMR
(CDCl_{3}, 25 MHz) δ 128.4
Other NMR data

MS
Masses of
main fragments

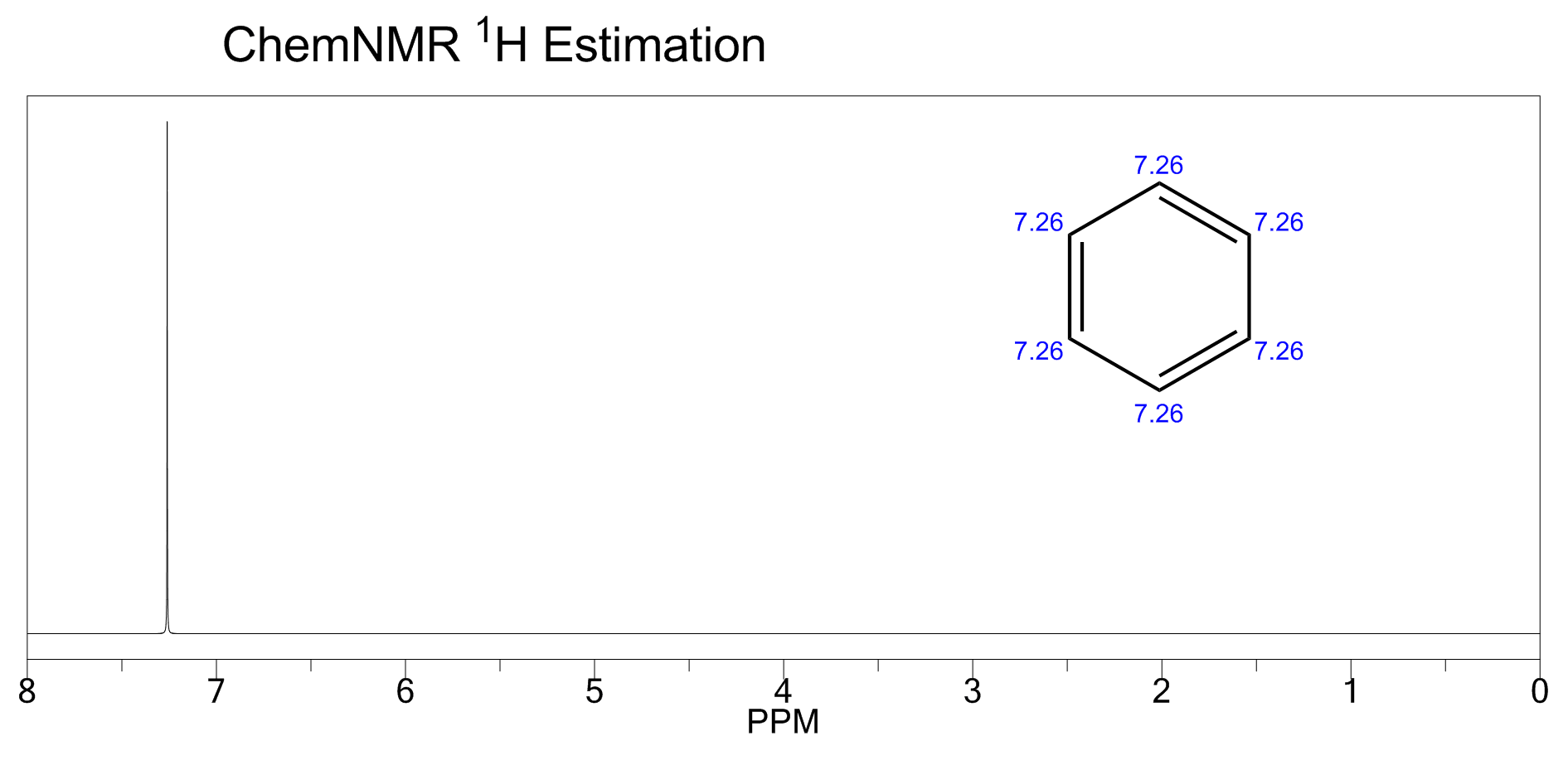
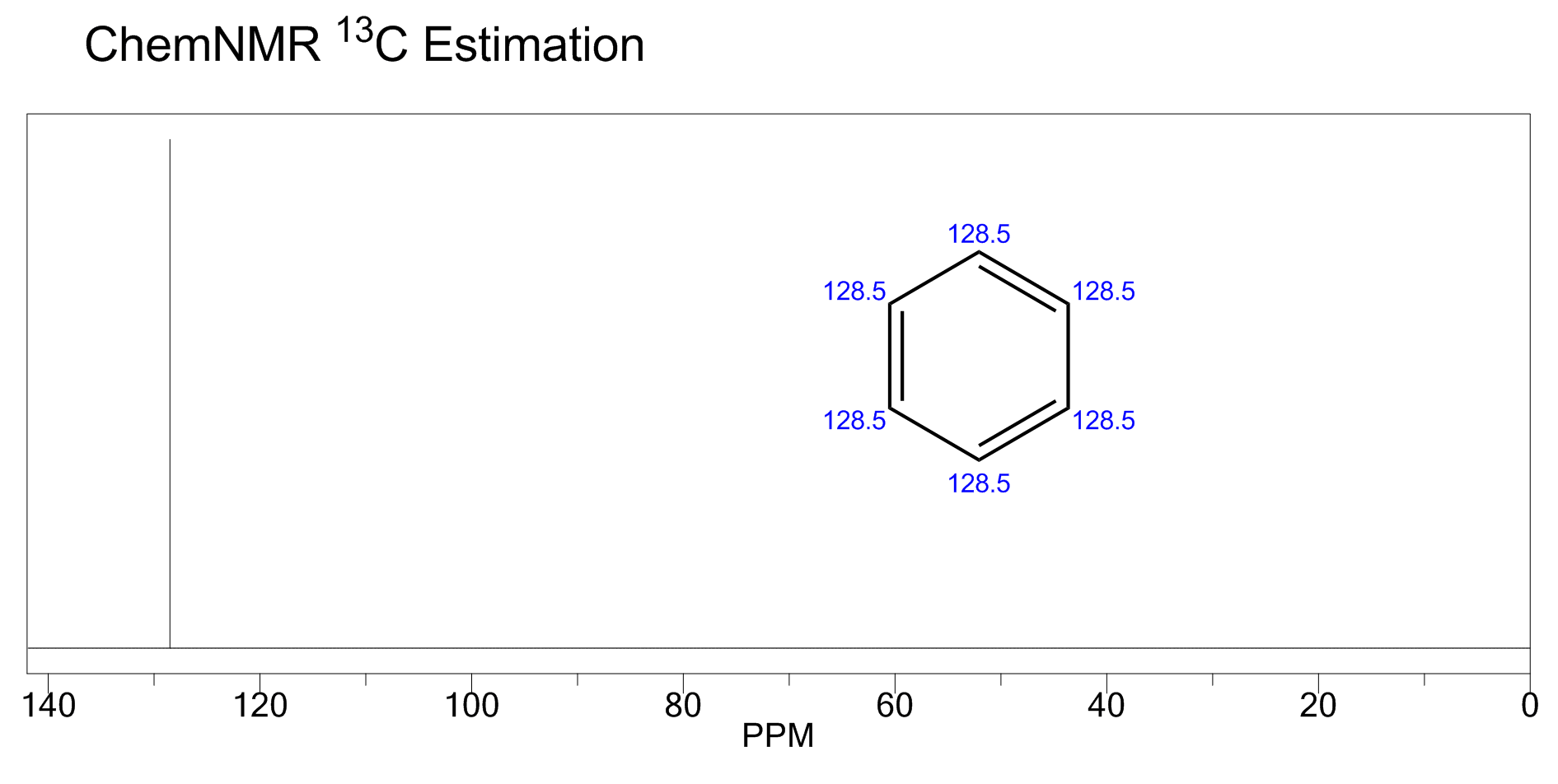

== Safety data ==
Material Safety Data Sheet for benzene:

| Common synonyms | None |
| Physical properties | Form: colorless liquid |
| | Stability: Stable, but very flammable |
| | Melting point: 5.5 C |
| | Water solubility: negligible |
| | Specific gravity: 0.87 |
| Principal hazards | *** Benzene is a carcinogen (cancer-causing agent). |
| | *** Very flammable. The pure material, and any solutions containing it, constitute a fire risk. |
| Safe handling | Benzene should NOT be used at all unless no safer alternatives are available. |
| | If benzene must be used in an experiment, it should be handled at all stages in a fume cupboard. |
| | Wear safety glasses and use protective gloves. |
| Emergency | Eye contact: Immediately flush the eye with plenty of water. Continue for at least ten minutes |
| | and call for immediate medical help. |
| | Skin contact: Wash off with soap and water. Remove any contaminated clothing. If the skin |
| | reddens or appears damaged, call for medical aid. |
| | If swallowed: Call for immediate medical help. |
| Disposal | It is dangerous to try to dispose of benzene by washing it down a sink, since it is toxic, will cause environmental damage |
| | and presents a fire risk. It is probable that trying to dispose of benzene in this way will also break local |
| | environmental rules. Instead, retain in a safe place in the laboratory (well away from any source of ignition) |
| | for disposal with other flammable, non-chlorinated solvents. |
| Protective equipment | Safety glasses. If gloves are worn, PVA, butyl rubber and viton are suitable materials. |
