= Quercetin 2,3-dioxygenase =

quercetin 2,3-dioxygenase
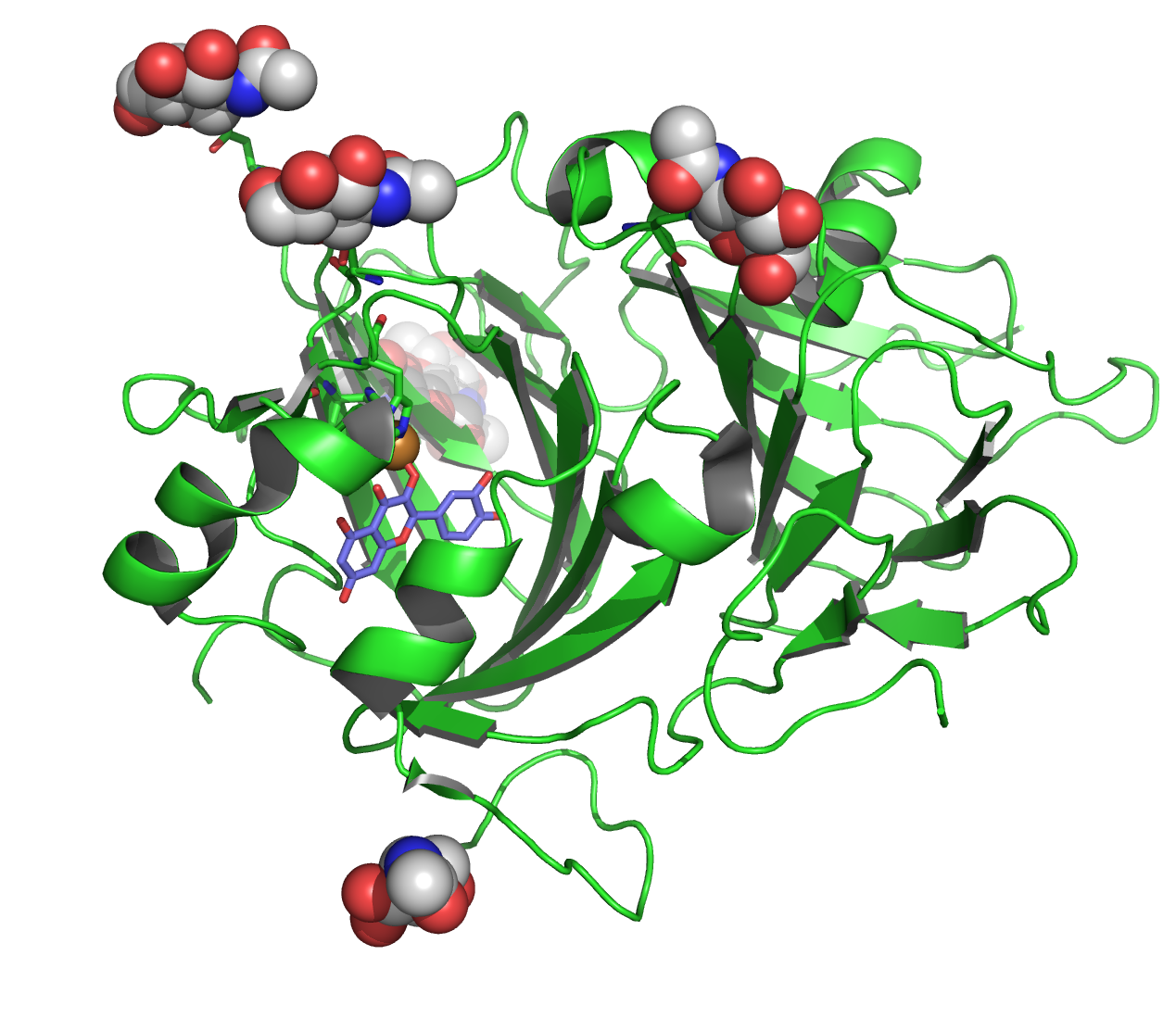
- Crystal structure of quercetin 2,3-dioxygenase from pdb entry 1H1I with quercetin and copper.

Identifiers
- EC no.: 1.13.11.24
- CAS no.: 9075-67-6

Databases
- BRENDA: enzyme data
- ExPASy: NiceZyme view
- KEGG: enzyme entry
- MetaCyc: metabolic pathway
- Rhea: reactions
- PDB structures: RCSB PDB PDBe PDBsum
- Gene Ontology: AmiGO / QuickGO
Search
- PMC: articles
- PubMed: articles
- NCBI: proteins

Quercetin 2,3-dioxygenase (EC 1.13.11.24) is an enzyme that catalyzes the chemical reaction

quercetin
O_{2}
CO
2-(3,4-dihydroxybenzoyloxy)-4,6-dihydroxybenzoic acid

The two substrates of this enzyme are quercetin and oxygen. Its products are 2-(3,4-dihydroxybenzoyloxy)-4,6-dihydroxybenzoic acid and carbon monoxide.

This enzyme belongs to the family of oxidoreductases, specifically those acting on single donors with O_{2} as oxidant and incorporation of two atoms of oxygen into the substrate (oxygenases). The oxygen incorporated need not be derived from O_{2}. The systematic name of this enzyme class is quercetin:oxygen 2,3-oxidoreductase (decyclizing). Other names in common use include quercetinase and flavonol 2,4-oxygenase. It has two cofactors: iron and copper.

== Structural studies ==
As of late 2007, six crystal structures have been solved for this class of enzymes, with PDB accession codes PDB: 1GQG, PDB: 1GQH, PDB: 1H1I, PDB: 1H1M, PDB: 1JUH, and PDB: 2H0V.
