= Aspergillus violaceofuscus =

Scientific classification
- Domain: Eukaryota
- Kingdom: Fungi
- Division: Ascomycota
- Class: Eurotiomycetes
- Order: Eurotiales
- Family: Aspergillaceae
- Genus: Aspergillus
- Species: A. violaceofuscus

Binomial name
- Aspergillus violaceofuscus Gasperini (1887)

Synonyms
- Aspergillus japonicus

Species of fungus

Aspergillus violaceofuscus is a species of fungus in the genus Aspergillus. It belongs to the group of black Aspergilli which are important industrial workhorses. A. violaceofuscus belongs to the Nigri section. The species was first described in 1887. It has been found both in marine environments in Bahamas and in soil in Puerto Rico. The genome of A. violaceofuscus was sequenced and published in 2014 as part of the Aspergillus whole-genome sequencing project – a project dedicated to performing whole-genome sequencing of all members of the genus Aspergillus. The genome assembly size was 36.01 Mbp.

== Growth and morphology ==
A. violaceofuscus has been cultivated on both Czapek yeast extract agar (CYA) plates and Malt Extract Agar Oxoid (MEAOX) plates. The growth morphology of the colonies can be seen in the pictures below.

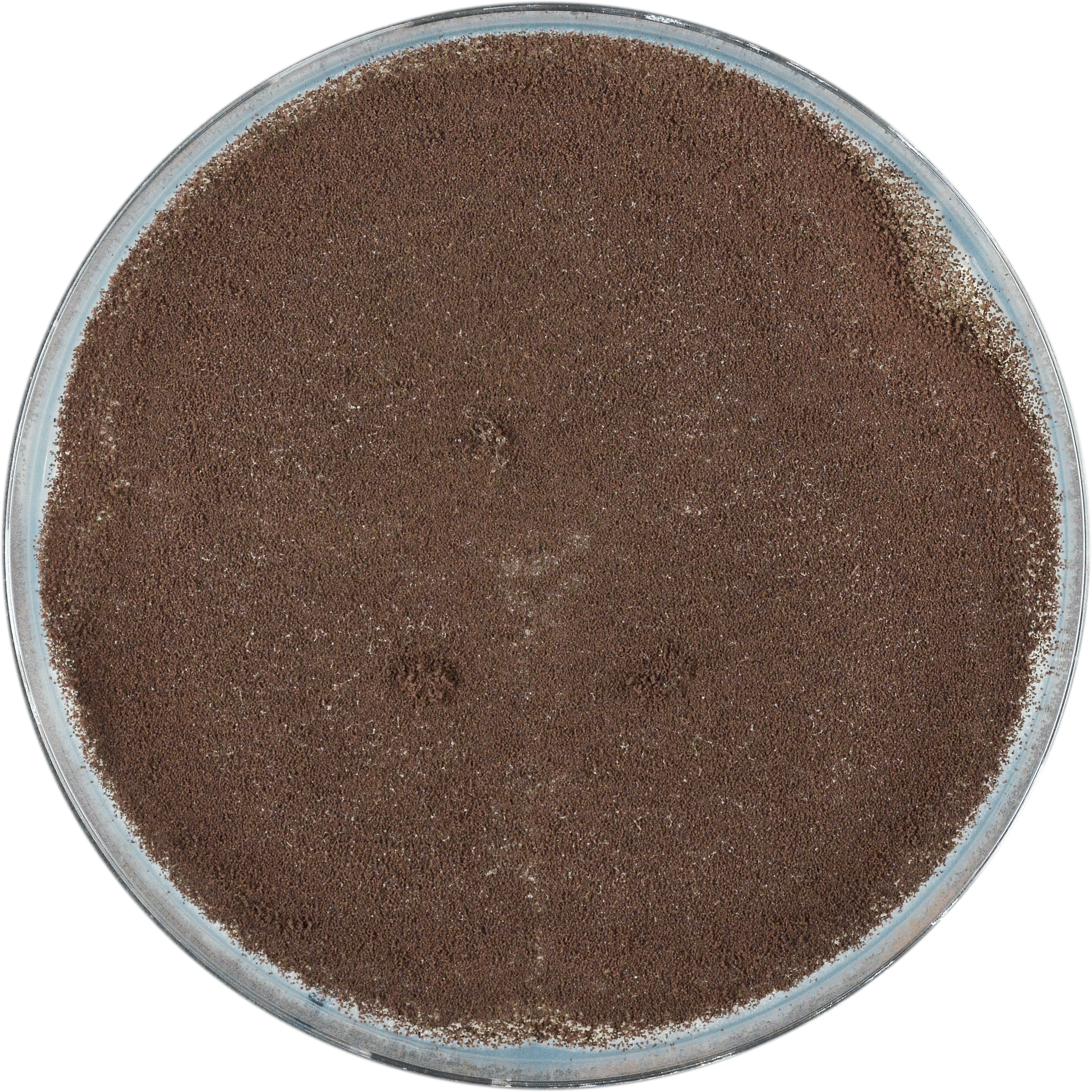
Aspergillus violaceofuscus growing on CYA plate

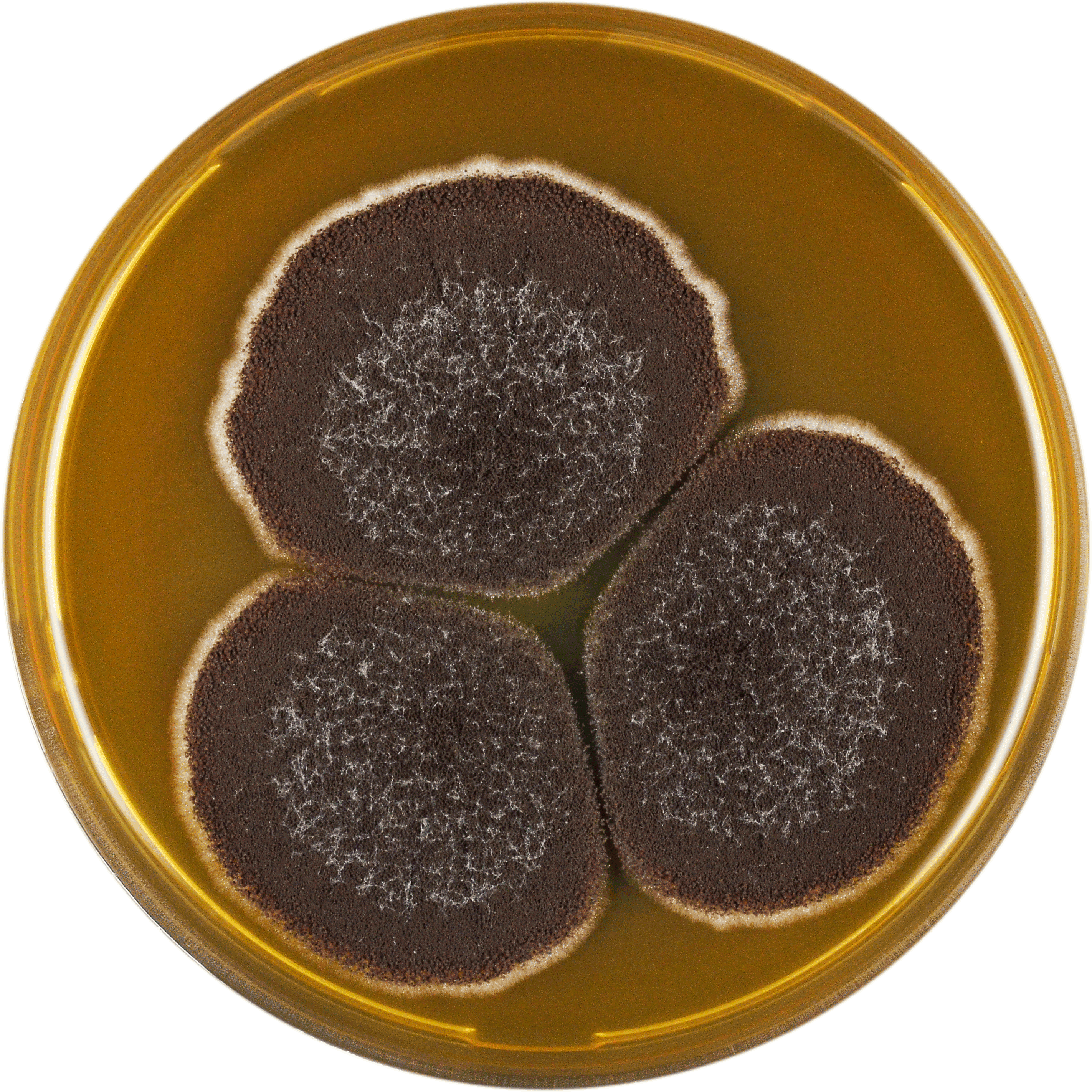
Aspergillus violaceofuscus growing on MEAOX plate
