= Muconic acid =

Names
- IUPAC name (2E,4E)-Hexa-2,4-dienedioic acid
- Other names (E,E)-Muconic acid

Identifiers
CAS Number	3588-17-8
3D model (JSmol)	Interactive image
ChEBI	CHEBI:27036
ChemSpider	4512358
ECHA InfoCard	100.020.659
EC Number	222-724-8
PubChem CID	5356793
UNII	3KD92ZL2KH
CompTox Dashboard (EPA)	DTXSID9052848
- InChI: InChI=1S/C6H6O4/c7-5(8)3-1-2-4-6(9)10/h1-4H,(H,7,8)(H,9,10)/b3-1+,4-2+ Key: TXXHDPDFNKHHGW-ZPUQHVIOSA-N; InChI=1/C6H6O4/c7-5(8)3-1-2-4-6(9)10/h1-4H,(H,7,8)(H,9,10)/b3-1+,4-2+ Key: TXXHDPDFNKHHGW-ZPUQHVIOBF
- SMILES: OC(\C=C/C=C\C(O)=O)=O

Properties
Chemical formula	C_{6}H_{6}O_{4}
Molar mass	142.110 g·mol^{−1}
Appearance	Crystalline prisms
Density	1.366 g/mL
Melting point	194 to 195 °C (381 to 383 °F; 467 to 468 K) (cis,cis-form, prisms from ethanol), 301 °C (trans,trans-form, prisms from water), 190–191 °C (cis,trans-form, needles from hot water)
Boiling point	345 °C (653 °F; 618 K)
Solubility in water	1 g/L

Hazards
- Occupational safety and health (OHS/OSH)
Main hazards	Irritant
- Except where otherwise noted, data are given for materials in their standard state (at 25 °C [77 °F], 100 kPa). verify (what is ?) Infobox references

Muconic acid is a dicarboxylic acid. There are three isomeric forms designated trans,trans-muconic acid, cis,trans-muconic acid, and cis,cis-muconic acid which differ by the geometry around the double bonds. Its name is derived from mucic acid.

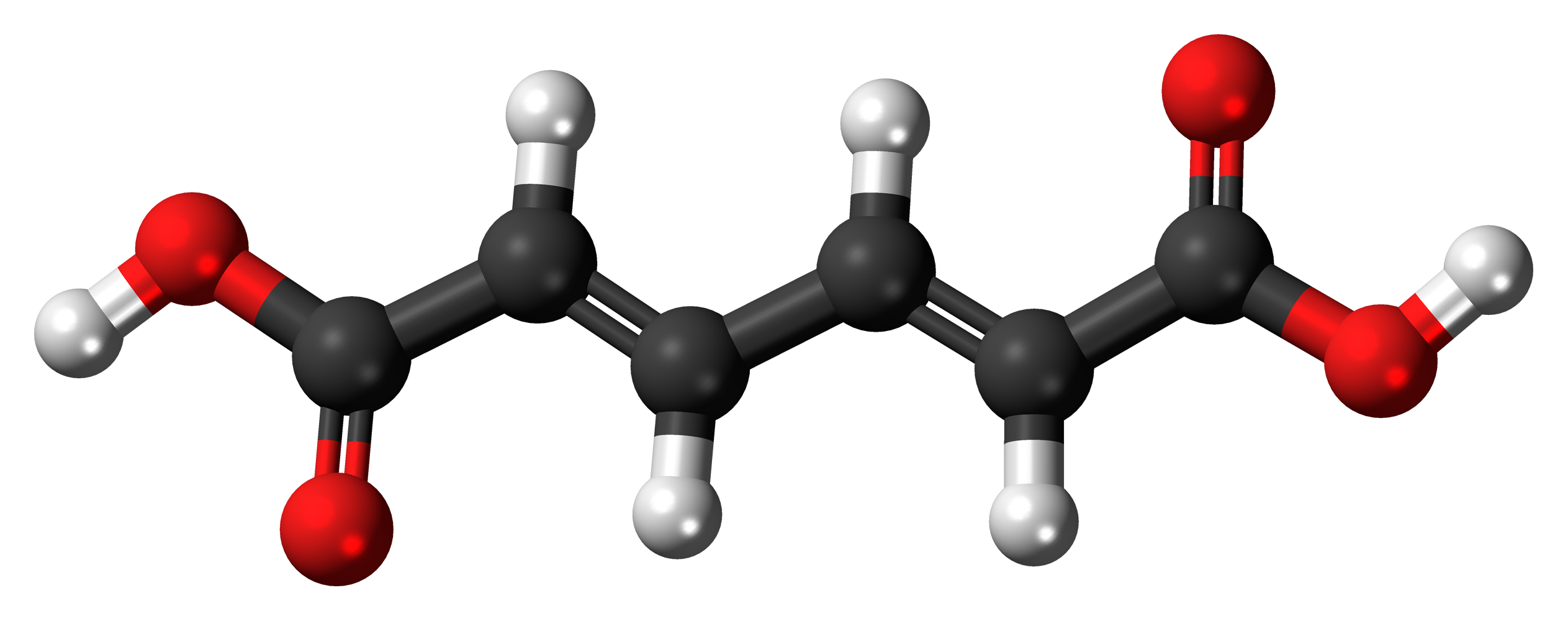
trans,trans

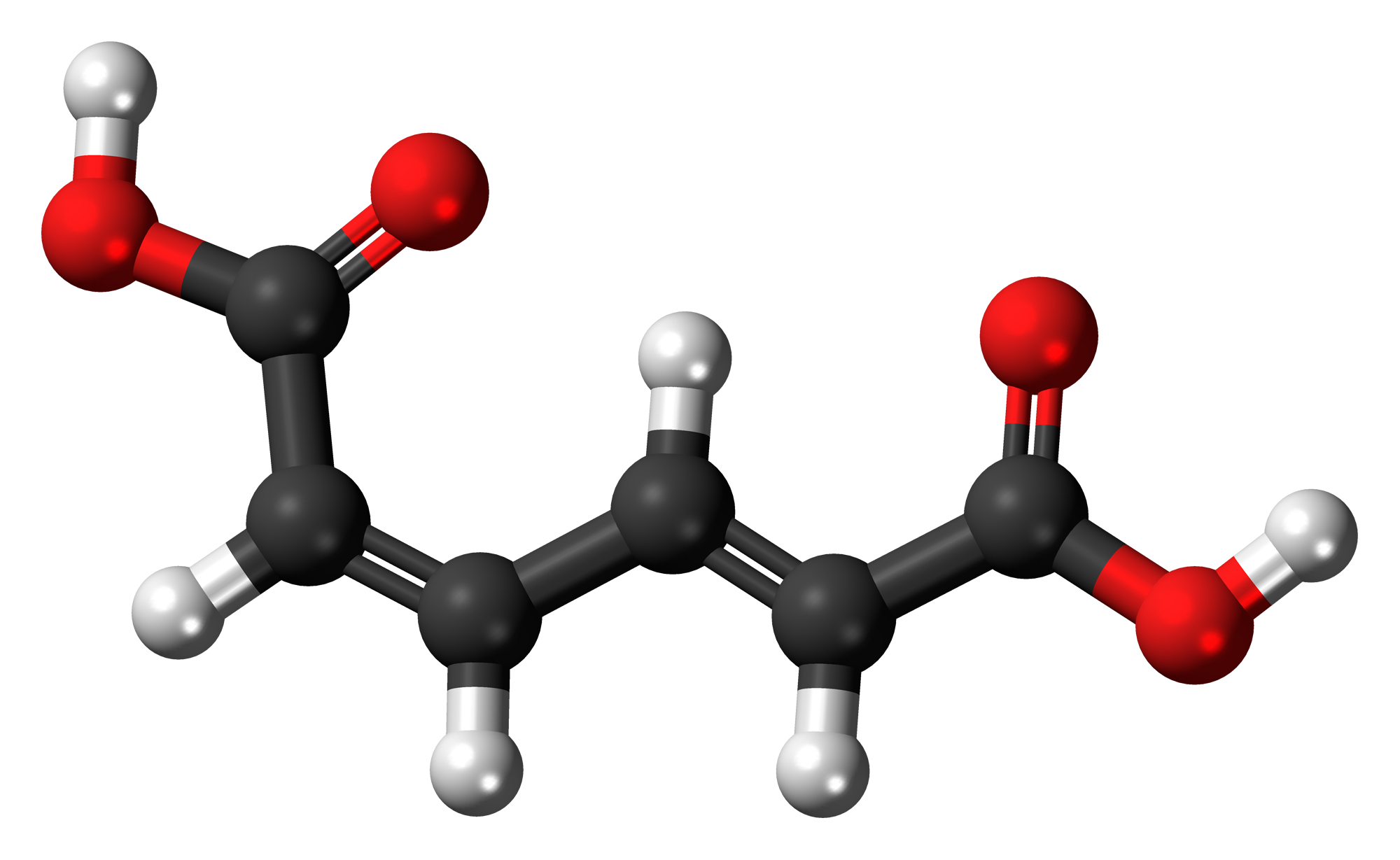
cis,trans

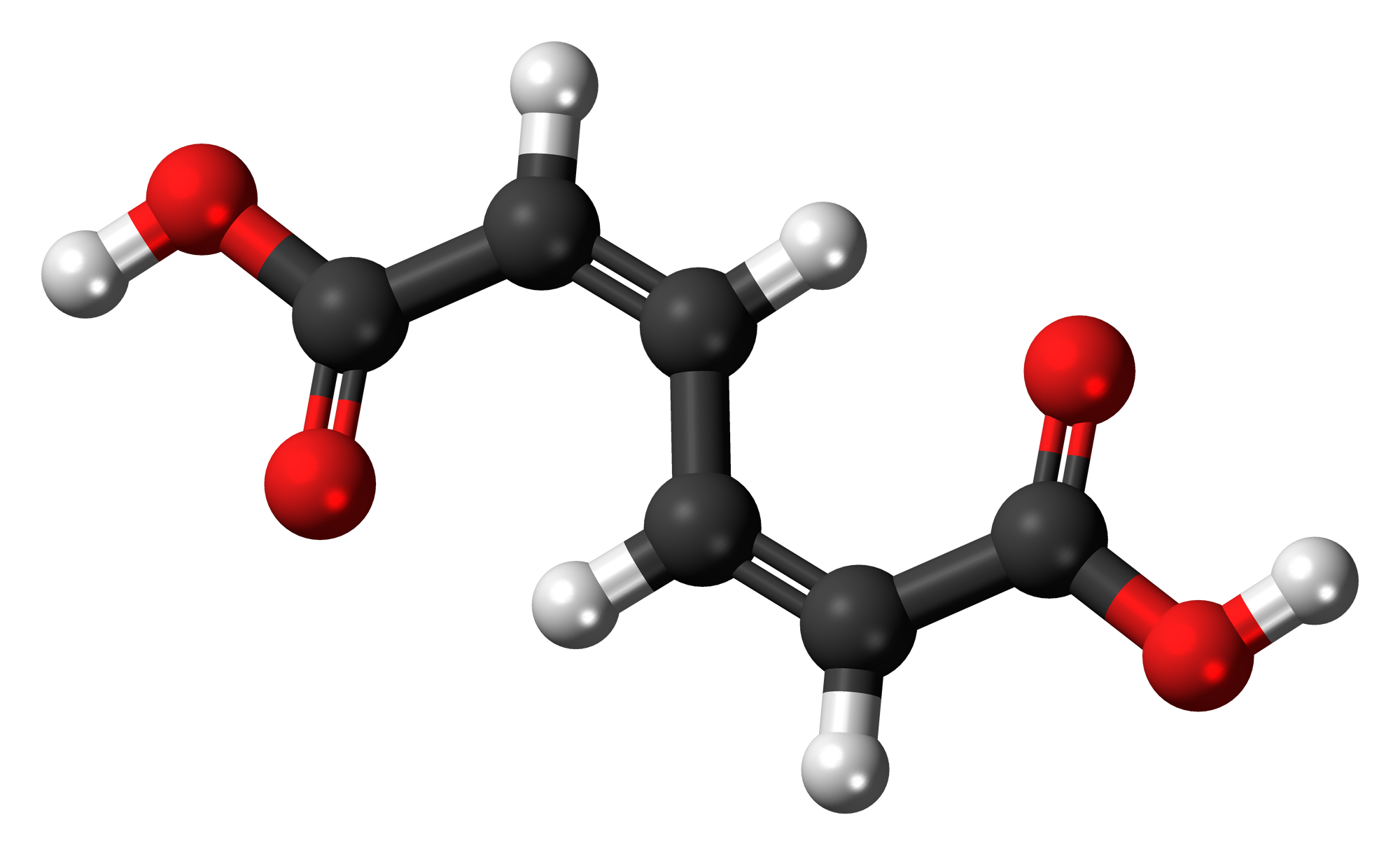
cis,cis

trans,trans-Muconic acid is a metabolite of benzene in humans. The determination of its concentration in urine is therefore used as a biomarker of occupational or environmental exposure to benzene. Synthetically, trans,trans-muconic acid can be prepared from adipic acid.

cis,cis-Muconic acid is produced by some bacteria by the enzymatic degradation of various aromatic chemical compounds.

The bioproduction of muconic acid is of interest because of its potential use as a platform chemical for the production of several valuable consumer bioplastics including nylon-6,6, polyurethane, and polyethylene terephthalate.

== See also ==
- Dicarboxylic acid
- 2-Aminomuconic acid
