= Parageobacillus =

Scientific classification
- Domain: Bacteria
- Kingdom: Bacillati
- Phylum: Bacillota
- Class: Bacilli
- Order: Bacillales
- Family: Bacillaceae
- Genus: Parageobacillus; Aliyu et al. 2019

Type species
- Parageobacillus thermoglucosidasius (Suzuki 1984) Nazina et al. 2001

Species
- P. caldoxylosilyticus; P. galactosidasius; P. thermantarcticus; P. thermoglucosidasius; P. toebii; P. yumthangensis

Genus of bacteria

Parageobacillus is a genus of bacteria from the family Bacillaceae.

== Phylogeny ==
The currently accepted taxonomy is based on the List of Prokaryotic names with Standing in Nomenclature (LPSN) and National Center for Biotechnology Information (NCBI).

16S rRNA based LTP_10_2024

- - Saccharococcus
    S. thermophilus Nystrand 1984
  - Parageobacillus
    - P. caldoxylosilyticus (Ahmad et al. 2000) Aliyu et al. 2019
    - - P. thermoglucosidasius (Suzuki 1984) Aliyu et al. 2019
      - - P. thermantarcticus (Nicolaus et al. 2002) Aliyu et al. 2019
        - - - P. toebii (Sung et al. 2002) Aliyu et al. 2019
            - P. yumthangensis (Najar et al. 2018) Najar, Das & Thakur 2020
          - - P. galactosidasius (Poli et al. 2012) Najar, Das & Thakur 2020
            - - Thermolongibacillus
                - T. kozakliensis Cihan et al. 2014
                - T. altinsuensis Cihan et al. 2014

120 marker proteins based GTDB 09-RS220

- - - Parageobacillus
      - - P. toebii [incl. P. galactosidasius; P. yumthangensis]
        - - P. thermantarcticus
          - P. thermoglucosidasius
  - - - Saccharococcus
        - S. caldoxylosilyticus Ahmad et al. 2000
        - S. thermophilus
    - other
