= C6H5NO2 =

The molecular formula C_{6}H_{5}NO_{2} (molar mass: 123.11 g/mol, exact mass: 123.0320 u) may refer to:

- Nitrobenzene
- Pyridinecarboxylic acid
  - Isonicotinic acid
  - Nicotinic acid
  - Picolinic acid
- 3-Hydroxyisonicotinaldehyde
