= Anthranilic hydroxylase =

Anthranilic hydroxylase may refer to:

- Anthranilate 3-monooxygenase
- Anthranilate 1,2-dioxygenase (deaminating, decarboxylating)
