= List of restriction enzyme cutting sites: Bst–Bv =

Legend of nucleobases
Code	Nucleotide represented
A	Adenine (A)
C	Cytosine (C)
G	Guanine (G)
T	Thymine (T)
N	A, C, G or T
M	A or C
R	A or G
W	A or T
Y	C or T
S	C or G
K	G or T
H	A, C or T
B	C, G or T
V	A, C or G
D	A, G or T

This article contains a list of the most studied restriction enzymes whose names start with Bst to Bv inclusive. It contains approximately 200 enzymes.

The following information is given:

- Enzyme: Accepted name of the molecule, according to the internationally adopted nomenclature, and bibliographical references. (Further reading: see the section "Nomenclature" in the article "Restriction enzyme".)
- PDB code: Code used to identify the structure of a protein in the PDB database of protein structures. The 3D atomic structure of a protein provides highly valuable information to understand the intimate details of its mechanism of action.
- Source: Organism that naturally produces the enzyme.
- Recognition sequence: Sequence of DNA recognized by the enzyme and to which it specifically binds.
- Cut: Cutting site and DNA products of the cut. The recognition sequence and the cutting site usually match, but sometimes the cutting site can be dozens of nucleotides away from the recognition site.
- Isoschizomers and neoschizomers: An isoschizomer is an enzyme that recognizes the same sequence as another. A neoschizomer is a special type of isoschizomer that recognizes the same sequence as another, but cuts in a different manner. A maximum number of 8-10 most common isoschizomers are indicated for every enzyme but there may be many more. Neoschizomers are shown in bold and green color font (e.g.: **BamHI**). When "None on date" is indicated, that means that there were no registered isoschizomers in the databases on that date with a clearly defined cutting site. Isoschizomers indicated in white font and grey background correspond to enzymes not listed in the current lists:

as in this not listed enzyme:	EcoR70I

1

== Restriction enzymes ==
=== Bst ===
**Enzyme**	**PDB code**	Source	**Recognition sequence**	**Cut**	**Isoschizomers**
BstI		Bacillus stearothermophilus 1503-4R	5' GGATCC; 3' CCTAGG	5' ---G GATCC--- 3'; 3' ---CCTAG G--- 5'	AccEBI, AliI, ApaCI, AsiI, BamHI, BnaI, BspAAIII, Nsp29132II
Bst1I		Bacillus stearothermophilus 1	5' CCWGG; 3' GGWCC	5' ---CC WGG--- 3'; 3' ---GGW CC--- 5'	AglI, BseBI, Bse17I, BstNI, CbrI, CthII, **EcoRII**, MvaI, **SspAI**, TaqXI
Bst2I		Bacillus stearothermophilus 2	5' CCWGG; 3' GGWCC	5' ---CC WGG--- 3'; 3' ---GGW CC--- 5'	AglI, BseBI, Bse17I, BstNI, BstOI, Bst2UI, CthII, **EcoRII**, MvaI
Bst6I		Bacillus stearothermophilus 6	5' CTCTTC; 3' GAGAAG	5' ---CTCTTCN NNN--- 3'; 3' ---GAGAAGNNNN --- 5'
Bst11I		Bacillus stearothermophilus 11	5' ACTGG; 3' TGACC	5' ---ACTGGN --- 3'; 3' ---TGAC CN--- 5'
Bst12I		Bacillus stearothermophilus 12	5' GCAGC; 3' CGTCG	5' ---GCAGCN_{7}N NNNN--- 3'; 3' ---CGTCGN_{7}NNNNN --- 5'	AlwXI, BbvI, BseKI, BseXI, Bsp423I, Bst71I, BstV1I
Bst19I		Bacillus stearothermophilus 19	5' GCATC; 3' CGTAG	5' ---GCATCNNNN NN--- 3'; 3' ---CGTAGNNNNNN --- 5'
Bst19II		Bacillus stearothermophilus 19	5' GATC; 3' CTAG	5' --- GATC--- 3'; 3' ---CTAG --- 5'	BfuCI, Bsp2095I, **BspKT6I**, CcyI, FnuCI, MboI, NmeCI, SsiAI
Bst28I		Bacillus stearothermophilus 28	5' ATCGAT; 3' TAGCTA	5' ---AT CGAT--- 3'; 3' ---TAGC TA--- 5'	BciBI, BdiI, Bli41I, Bsa29I, Bsp106I, BspDI, LplI, SpmI, ZhoI
Bst38I		Bacillus stearothermophilus 38	5' CCWGG; 3' GGWCC	5' ---CC WGG--- 3'; 3' ---GGW CC--- 5'	AorI, BseBI, Bse17I, BsiLI, BspNI, BstOI, Bst2UI, **EcoRII**, MvaI
Bst40I		Bacillus stearothermophilus 40	5' CCGG; 3' GGCC	5' ---C CGG--- 3'; 3' ---GGC C--- 5'
Bst71I		Bacillus stearothermophilus 71	5' GCAGC; 3' CGTCG	5' ---GCAGCN_{7}N NNNN--- 3'; 3' ---CGTCGN_{7}NNNNN --- 5'	AlwXI, BbvI, BseKI, BseXI, Bsp423I, Bst12I, BstV1I
Bst98I		Bacillus stearothermophilus C98	5' CTTAAG; 3' GAATTC	5' ---C TTAAG--- 3'; 3' ---GAATT C--- 5'
Bst100I		Bacillus stearothermophilus 100	5' CCWGG; 3' GGWCC	5' ---CC WGG--- 3'; 3' ---GGW CC--- 5'	AorI, BseBI, Bse24I, BstNI, BstOI, Bst2UI, BthDI, **EcoRII**, MvaI, **SleI**
Bst1107I		Bacillus stearothermophilus RFL1107	5' GTATAC; 3' CATATG	5' ---GTA TAC--- 3'; 3' ---CAT ATG--- 5'
BstACI		Bacillus stearothermophilus AC	5' GRCGYC; 3' CYGCRG	5' ---GR CGYC--- 3'; 3' ---CYGC RG--- 5'	AcyI, AhaII, AosII, AstWI, AsuIII, BsaHI, HgiI, HgiDI, Hsp92I
BstAPI		Bacillus stearothermophilus AP	5' GCAN_{4}NTGC; 3' CGTN_{4}NACG	5' ---GCANNNN NTGC--- 3'; 3' ---CGTN NNNNACG--- 5'	**ApaBI**
BstAUI		Bacillus stearothermophilus AU	5' TGTACA; 3' ACATGT	5' ---T GTACA--- 3'; 3' ---ACATG T--- 5'	AauI, / BsmRI, / Bsp1407I, BsrGI, Ssp4800I, SspBI
BstBI		Bacillus stearothermophilus B225	5' TTCGAA; 3' AAGCTT	5' ---TT CGAA--- 3'; 3' ---AAGC TT--- 5'	AcpI, Bim19I, Bpu14I, BspT104I, Csp45I, LspI, NspV, SspRFI
Bst2BI		Bacillus stearothermophilus 2B	5' CACGAG; 3' GTGCTC	5' ---C ACGAG--- 3'; 3' ---GTGCT C--- 5'
BstBAI		Bacillus stearothermophilus BA	5' YACGTR; 3' RTGCAY	5' ---YAC GTR--- 3'; 3' ---RTG CAY--- 5'
BstBSI		Bacillus stearothermophilus BS	5' GTATAC; 3' CATATG	5' ---GTA TAC--- 3'; 3' ---CAT ATG--- 5'
BstB7SI		Bacillus stearothermophilus B7S	5' RCCGGY; 3' YGGCCR	5' ---R CCGGY--- 3'; 3' ---YGGCC R--- 5'
BstBS32I		Bacillus stearothermophilus BS32	5' GAAGAC; 3' CTTCTG	5' ---GAAGACNN NNNN--- 3'; 3' ---CTTCTGNNNNNN --- 5'
BstBZ153I		Bacillus stearothermophilus BZ153	5' GCGCGC; 3' CGCGCG	5' ---G CGCGC--- 3'; 3' ---CGCGC G--- 5'
Bst4CI		Bacillus stearothermophilus 4C	5' ACNGT; 3' TGNCA	5' ---ACN GT--- 3'; 3' ---TG NCA--- 5'
BstC8I		Bacillus stearothermophilus C8	5' GCNNGC; 3' CGNNCG	5' ---GCN NGC--- 3'; 3' ---CGN NCG--- 5'
BstD102I		Bacillus stearothermophilus D102	5' CCGCTC; 3' GGCGAG	5' ---CCG CTC--- 3'; 3' ---GGC GAG--- 5'	AccBSI, BsrBI, Bst31NI, MbiI
BstDEI		Bacillus stearothermophilus DE	5' CTNAG; 3' GANTC	5' ---C TNAG--- 3'; 3' ---GANT C--- 5'
BstDSI		Bacillus stearothermophilus DS	5' CCRYGG; 3' GGYRCC	5' ---C CRYGG--- 3'; 3' ---GGYRC C--- 5'
BstEII		Bacillus stearothermophilus ET	5' GGTNACC; 3' CCANTGG	5' ---G GTNACC--- 3'; 3' ---CCANTG G--- 5'	AcrII, BstPI, BstT9I, BstT10I, EcaI, Eco91I, EcoO65I, NspSAII, PspEI
BstENI		Bacillus stearothermophilus EN	5' CCTN_{4}NAGG; 3' GGAN_{4}NTCC	5' ---CCTNN NNNAGG--- 3'; 3' ---GGANNN NNTCC--- 5'
BstENII		Bacillus stearothermophilus EN	5' GATC; 3' CTAG	5' --- GATC--- 3'; 3' ---CTAG --- 5'	BfuCI, Bsp2095I, **BspKT6I**, CcyI, FnuCI, MboI, NmeCI, SsiAI
BstEZ359I		Bacillus stearothermophilus EZ359	5' GTTAAC; 3' CAATTG	5' ---GTT AAC--- 3'; 3' ---CAA TTG--- 5'
BstFI		Bacillus stearothermophilus FH58	5' AAGCTT; 3' TTCGAA	5' ---A AGCTT--- 3'; 3' ---TTCGA A--- 5'
BstF5I		Bacillus stearothermophilus F5	5' GGATG; 3' CCTAC	5' ---GGATGNN --- 3'; 3' ---CCTAC NN--- 5'
BstFNI		Bacillus stearothermophilus	5' CGCG; 3' GCGC	5' ---CG CG--- 3'; 3' ---GC GC--- 5'	AccII, BceBI, BepI, Bpu95I, BstUI, Csp68KVI, FauBII, MvnI, **SelI**
BstFZ438I		Bacillus stearothermophilus FZ438	5' CCCGC; 3' GGGCG	5' ---CCCGCNNNN NN--- 3'; 3' ---GGGCGNNNNNN --- 5'
BstGZ53I		Bacillus stearothermophilus GZ53	5' CGTCTC; 3' GCAGAG	5' ---CGTCTCN NNNN--- 3'; 3' ---GCAGAGNNNNN --- 5'
BstH2I		Bacillus stearothermophilus H2	5' RGCGCY; 3' YCGCGR	5' ---RGCGC Y--- 3'; 3' ---Y CGCGR--- 5'	AccB2I, / BfoI, / **Bme142I**, Bsp143II, HaeII, **LpnI**
BstH9I		Bacillus stearothermophilus H9	5' GGATC; 3' CCTAG	5' ---GGATCNNNN N--- 3'; 3' ---CCTAGNNNNN --- 5'	AclWI, AlwI, BinI, / BpuFI, / BspPI, Bst31TI, BthII, Bth617I, / EacI
BstHHI		Bacillus stearothermophilus HH	5' GCGC; 3' CGCG	5' ---GCG C--- 3'; 3' ---C GCG--- 5'	AspLEI, BspLAI, CfoI, FnuDIII, HhaI, **Hin6I**, **HinP1I**, **HsoI**, **HspAI**, **SciNI**
BstHPI		Bacillus stearothermophilus HP	5' GTTAAC; 3' CAATTG	5' ---GTT AAC--- 3'; 3' ---CAA TTG--- 5'
BstHZ55I		Bacillus stearothermophilus HZ55	5' CCAN_{6}TGG; 3' GGTN_{6}ACC	5' ---CCANNNNN NTGG--- 3'; 3' ---GGTN NNNNNACC--- 5'
BstIZ316I		Bacillus stearothermophilus IZ316	5' CACNNNGTG; 3' GTGNNNCAC	5' ---CACNNN GTG--- 3'; 3' ---GTG NNNCAC--- 5'	AdeI, DraIII
BstJZ301I		Bacillus stearothermophilus JZ301	5' CTNAG; 3' GANTC	5' ---C TNAG--- 3'; 3' ---GANT C--- 5'
BstKTI		Bacillus stearothermophilus KT	5' GATC; 3' CTAG	5' ---GAT C--- 3'; 3' ---C TAG--- 5'	**AspMDI**, **Bsp2095I**, **Bst19II**, BspKT6I, **DpnII**, **MboI**, **NmeCI**, **SsiAI**
BstM6I		Bacillus stearothermophilus M6	5' CCWGG; 3' GGWCC	5' ---CC WGG--- 3'; 3' ---GGW CC--- 5'	AorI, BseBI, Bse24I, BstNI, BstOI, Bst2UI, BthDI, Fsp1604I, MvaI
BstMAI		Bacillus stearothermophilus MA	5' GTCTC; 3' CAGAG	5' ---GTCTCN NNNNN--- 3'; 3' ---CAGAGNNNNN N--- 5'	Alw26I, / BcoDI, BscQII, / BsmAI, BsoMAI
BstMBI		Bacillus stearothermophilus MB	5' GATC; 3' CTAG	5' --- GATC--- 3'; 3' ---CTAG --- 5'	Bce243I, Bsp105I, BspFI, **BstKTI**, CpfI, HacI, NdeII, Sth368I
BstMCI		Bacillus stearothermophilus MC	5' CGRYCG; 3' GCYRGC	5' ---CGRY CG--- 3'; 3' ---GC YRGC--- 5'
BstMWI		Bacillus stearothermophilus MW	5' GCN_{7}GC; 3' CGN_{7}CG	5' ---GCNNNNN NNGC--- 3'; 3' ---CGNN NNNNNCG--- 5'
BstMZ611I		Bacillus stearothermophilus MZ611	5' CCNGG; 3' GGNCC	5' --- CCNGG--- 3'; 3' ---GGNCC --- 5'
BstNI		Bacillus stearothermophilus	5' CCWGG; 3' GGWCC	5' ---CC WGG--- 3'; 3' ---GGW CC--- 5'	**AjnI**, BciBII, BptI, Bst1I, BstOI, Bst2UI, Fsp1604I, SniI, Sth117I
Bst31NI		Bacillus stearothermophilus 31N	5' CCGCTC; 3' GGCGAG	5' ---CCG CTC--- 3'; 3' ---GGC GAG--- 5'	AccBSI, BsrBI, BstD102I, MbiI
BstNSI		Bacillus stearothermophilus 1161NS	5' RCATGY; 3' YGTACR	5' ---RCATG Y--- 3'; 3' ---Y GTACR--- 5'
BstNZ169I		Bacillus stearothermophilus NZ169	5' ATCGAT; 3' TAGCTA	5' ---AT CGAT--- 3'; 3' ---TAGC TA--- 5'	BanIII, BciBI, BdiI, Bli41I, Bsa29I, BspDI, LplI, Rme21I, SpmI, ZhoI
BstOI		Bacillus stearothermophilus O22	5' CCWGG; 3' GGWCC	5' ---CC WGG--- 3'; 3' ---GGW CC--- 5'	**AjnI**, ApyI, BciBII, BptI, Bst1I, Bst2UI, Fsp1604I, SniI, Sth117I
BstOZ616I		Bacillus stearothermophilus OZ616	5' GGGAC; 3' CCCTG	5' ---GGGACN_{8}NN NNNN--- 3'; 3' ---CCCTGN_{8}NNNNNN --- 5'
BstPI		Bacillus stearothermophilus	5' GGTNACC; 3' CCANTGG	5' ---G GTNACC--- 3'; 3' ---CCANTG G--- 5'	AcrII, AspAI, BstEII, BstT9I, EcaI, Eco91I, EcoO65I, NspSAII, PspEI
BstPAI		Bacillus stearothermophilus PA	5' GACN_{4}GTC; 3' CTGN_{4}CAG	5' ---GACNN NNGTC--- 3'; 3' ---CTGNN NNCAG--- 5'
BstPZ418I			5' GGATG; 3' CCTAC	5' ---GGATGN_{8}N NNNN--- 3'; 3' ---CCTACN_{8}NNNNN --- 5'
BstPZ740I		Bacillus stearothermophilus PZ740	5' CTTAAG; 3' GAATTC	5' ---C TTAAG--- 3'; 3' ---GAATT C--- 5'
BstRZ246I		Bacillus stearothermophilus RZ246	5' ATTTAAAT; 3' TAAATTTA	5' ---ATTT AAAT--- 3'; 3' ---TAAA TTTA--- 5'
BstSI		Bacillus stearothermophilus S183	5' CYCGRG; 3' GRGCYC	5' ---C YCGRG--- 3'; 3' ---GRGCY C--- 5'	Ama87I, AvaI, Bse15I, BsoBI, Eco27kI, NspIII, OfoI, PunAI
BstSCI		Bacillus stearothermophilus SC	5' CCNGG; 3' GGNCC	5' --- CCNGG--- 3'; 3' ---GGNCC --- 5'
BstSFI		Bacillus stearothermophilus SF	5' CTRYAG; 3' GAYRTC	5' ---C TRYAG--- 3'; 3' ---GAYRT C--- 5'
BstSNI		Bacillus stearothermophilus SN	5' TACGTA; 3' ATGCAT	5' ---TAC GTA--- 3'; 3' ---ATG CAT--- 5'
BstSWI		Bacillus stearothermophilus SW	5' ATTTAAAT; 3' TAAATTTA	5' ---ATTT AAAT--- 3'; 3' ---TAAA TTTA--- 5'
BstT7I		Bacillus stearothermophilus T7	5' TGATCA; 3' ACTAGT	5' ---T GATCA--- 3'; 3' ---ACTAG T--- 5'	AbaI, BclI, BsiQI, BspXII, FbaI, Ksp22I, / ParI
BstT9I		Bacillus stearothermophilus T9	5' GGTNACC; 3' CCANTGG	5' ---G GTNACC--- 3'; 3' ---CCANTG G--- 5'	AspAI, Bse64I, BstT10I, BstPI, Eco91I, EcoO128I, NspSAII, PspEI
BstT10I		Bacillus stearothermophilus T10	5' GGTNACC; 3' CCANTGG	5' ---G GTNACC--- 3'; 3' ---CCANTG G--- 5'	AspAI, BseT10I, BstEII, BstT10I, Eco91I, EcoO128I, NspSAII, PspEI
Bst31TI		Bacillus stearothermophilus 31T	5' GGATC; 3' CCTAG	5' ---GGATCNNNN N--- 3'; 3' ---CCTAGNNNNN --- 5'
BstTS5I		Bacillus stearothermophilus TS5	5' GAAGAC; 3' CTTCTG	5' ---GAAGACNN NNNN--- 3'; 3' ---CTTCTGNNNNNN --- 5'
BstUI		Bacillus stearothermophilus U458	5' CGCG; 3' GCGC	5' ---CG CG--- 3'; 3' ---GC GC--- 5'	AccII, BceBI, BepI, Bpu95I, BtkI, Csp68KVI, FauBII, MvnI, **SelI**
Bst2UI		Bacillus stearothermophilus 2U	5' CCWGG; 3' GGWCC	5' ---CC WGG--- 3'; 3' ---GGW CC--- 5'	**AjnI**, BciBII, BptI, Bst1I, BstOI, BstM6I, SniI, SslI, TaqXI, ZanI
BstVI		Bacillus stearothermophilus V	5' CTCGAG; 3' GAGCTC	5' ---C TCGAG--- 3'; 3' ---GAGCT C--- 5'	BluI, BssHI, MlaAI, PanI, SauLPII, **SciI**, SlaI, StrI, XhoI
BstV1I		Bacillus stearothermophilus V1	5' GCAGC; 3' CGTCG	5' ---GCAGCN_{7}N NNNN--- 3'; 3' ---CGTCGN_{7}NNNNN --- 5'	AlwXI, BbvI, BseKI, BseXI, Bsp423I, Bst12I, Bst71I
BstV2I		Bacillus stearothermophilus V2	5' GAAGAC; 3' CTTCTG	5' ---GAAGACNN NNNN--- 3'; 3' ---CTTCTGNNNNNN --- 5'
BstXI		Bacillus stearothermophilus X1	5' CCAN_{6}TGG; 3' GGTN_{6}ACC	5' ---CCANNNNN NTGG--- 3'; 3' ---GGTN NNNNNACC--- 5'
BstX2I		Bacillus stearothermophilus X2	5' RGATCY; 3' YCTAGR	5' ---R GATCY--- 3'; 3' ---YCTAG R--- 5'
BstYI	1SDO	Bacillus stearothermophilus Y406	5' RGATCY; 3' YCTAGR	5' ---R GATCY--- 3'; 3' ---YCTAG R--- 5'
BstZI		Bacillus stearothermophilus Z130	5' CGGCCG; 3' GCCGGC	5' ---C GGCCG--- 3'; 3' ---GCCGG C--- 5'	AaaI, BseX3I, EagI, EclXI, Eco52I, SenPT16I, XmaIII
BstZ17I		Bacillus stearothermophilus 38M	5' GTATAC; 3' CATATG	5' ---GTA TAC--- 3'; 3' ---CAT ATG--- 5'

=== Bsu - Bv ===
**Enzyme**	**PDB code**	Source	**Recognition sequence**	**Cut**	**Isoschizomers**
Bsu6I		Bacillus subtilis 6v1	5' CTCTTC; 3' GAGAAG	5' ---CTCTTCN NNN--- 3'; 3' ---GAGAAGNNNN --- 5'
Bsu15I		Bacillus subtilis 15	5' ATCGAT; 3' TAGCTA	5' ---AT CGAT--- 3'; 3' ---TAGC TA--- 5'	AagI, BanIII, BavCI, Bsa29I, BseCI, BspDI, BsuTUI, ClaI
Bsu23I		Bacillus subtilis 23	5' TCCGGA; 3' AGGCCT	5' ---T CCGGA--- 3'; 3' ---AGGCC T--- 5'	AccIII, BbvAIII, BseAI, BsiMI, BspEI, BspMII, CauB3I, MroI
Bsu36I		Bacillus subtilis 36	5' CCTNAGG; 3' GGANTCC	5' ---CC TNAGG--- 3'; 3' ---GGANT CC--- 5'	AxyI, BliHKI, BspR7I, Bsu36I, Eco81I, MstII, OxaNI, SshAI
Bsu54I		Bacillus subtilis 54	5' GGNCC; 3' CCNGG	5' ---G GNCC--- 3'; 3' ---CCNG G--- 5'	AsuI, Bac36I, BavBII, BsiZI, BspBII, CcuI, MaeK81II, PspPI
Bsu1532I		Bacillus subtilis 1532	5' CGCG; 3' GCGC	5' ---CG CG--- 3'; 3' ---GC GC--- 5'	BceBI, Bpu95I, Bsp123I, BstUI, BtkI, Csp68KVI, FnuDII, MvnI, ThaI
Bsu1854I		Bacillus subtilis 1854	5' GRGCYC; 3' CYCGRG	5' ---GRGCY C--- 3'; 3' ---C YCGRG--- 5'
BsuBI		Bacillus subtilis	5' CTGCAG; 3' GACGTC	5' ---CTGCA G--- 3'; 3' ---G ACGTC--- 5'	AjoI, BloHII, CflI, CstI, Ecl37kI, HalII, Psp23I, PstI, SalPI, SflI, YenI
BsuFI		Bacillus subtilis	5' CCGG; 3' GGCC	5' ---C CGG--- 3'; 3' ---GGC C--- 5'
BsuMI		Bacillus subtilis 168	5' CTCGAG; 3' GAGCTC	5' ---C TCGAG--- 3'; 3' ---GAGCT C--- 5'	XhoI, BssHI, TliI, PaeR7I, Sfr274I, SlaI, StrI
BsuRI		Bacillus subtilis R	5' GGCC; 3' CCGG	5' ---GG CC--- 3'; 3' ---CC GG--- 5'	HaeIII
BsuTUI		Bacillus subtilis TU	5' ATCGAT; 3' TAGCTA	5' ---AT CGAT--- 3'; 3' ---TAGC TA--- 5'	AagI, BanIII, BavCI, Bsa29I, BseCI, BspDI, Bsu15I, ClaI
BteI		Brochothrix thermosphacter	5' GGCC; 3' CCGG	5' ---GG CC--- 3'; 3' ---CC GG--- 5'
BtgI		Bacillus thermoglucosidasius	5' CCRYGG; 3' GGYRCC	5' ---C CRYGG--- 3'; 3' ---GGYRC C--- 5'
BtgZI		Bacillus thermoglucosidasius	5' GCGATG; 3' CGCTAC	5' ---GCGATGN_{8}NN NNNN--- 3'; 3' ---CGCTACN_{8}NNNNNN --- 5'
BthAI		Bacillus thuringiensis AII	5' GGWCC; 3' CCWGG	5' ---G GWCC--- 3'; 3' ---CCWG G--- 5'	BamNxI, BcuAI, BsrAI, Eco47I, FspMSI, HgiCII, HgiJI, SmuEI
BthCI		Bacillus thuringiensis 2294	5' GCNGC; 3' CGNCG	5' ---GCNG C--- 3'; 3' ---C GNCG--- 5'
BthDI		Bacillus thuringiensis D4	5' CCWGG; 3' GGWCC	5' ---CC WGG--- 3'; 3' ---GGW CC--- 5'	AorI, ApyI, Bse24I, BstNI, BstOI, Bst2UI, CbrI, **EcoRII**, MvaI, **SleI**
BthEI		Bacillus thuringiensis E	5' CCWGG; 3' GGWCC	5' ---CC WGG--- 3'; 3' ---GGW CC--- 5'	AorI, BseBI, Bse24I, BstNI, BstOI, Bst2UI, BthDI, **EcoRII**, MvaI, **SleI**
BtkI		Bacillus thuringiensis Kumantoensis	5' CGCG; 3' GCGC	5' ---CG CG--- 3'; 3' ---GC GC--- 5'	BepI, Bpu95I, Bsp123I, BstFNI, BstUI, BtkI, FalII, **SelI**, ThaI
BtkII		Bacillus thuringiensis Kumantoensis	5' GATC; 3' CTAG	5' --- GATC--- 3'; 3' ---CTAG --- 5'	BfuCI, Bsp67I, Bst19II, CcyI, FnuCI, MboI, NmeCI, SauMI
BtrI		Bacillus stearothermophilus SE-U62	5' CACGTC; 3' GTGCAG	5' ---CAC GTC--- 3'; 3' ---GTG CAG--- 5'
BtsI		Bacillus thermoglucosidasius	5' GCAGTG; 3' CGTCAC	5' ---GCAGTGNN --- 3'; 3' ---CGTCAC NN--- 5'
BveI		Brevundimonas vesicularis RFL1	5' ACCTGC; 3' TGGACG	5' ---ACCTGCNNNN NNNN--- 3'; 3' ---TGGACGNNNNNNNN --- 5'	Acc36I, BfuAI, BspMI
BvuI		Bacillus vulgatis	5' GRGCYC; 3' CYCGRG	5' ---GRGCY C--- 3'; 3' ---C YCGRG--- 5'
BvuBI		Bacteroides vulgatus	5' CGTACG; 3' GCATGC	5' ---C GTACG--- 3'; 3' ---GCATG C--- 5'
