= Aminomuconate-semialdehyde dehydrogenase =

aminomuconate-semialdehyde dehydrogenase
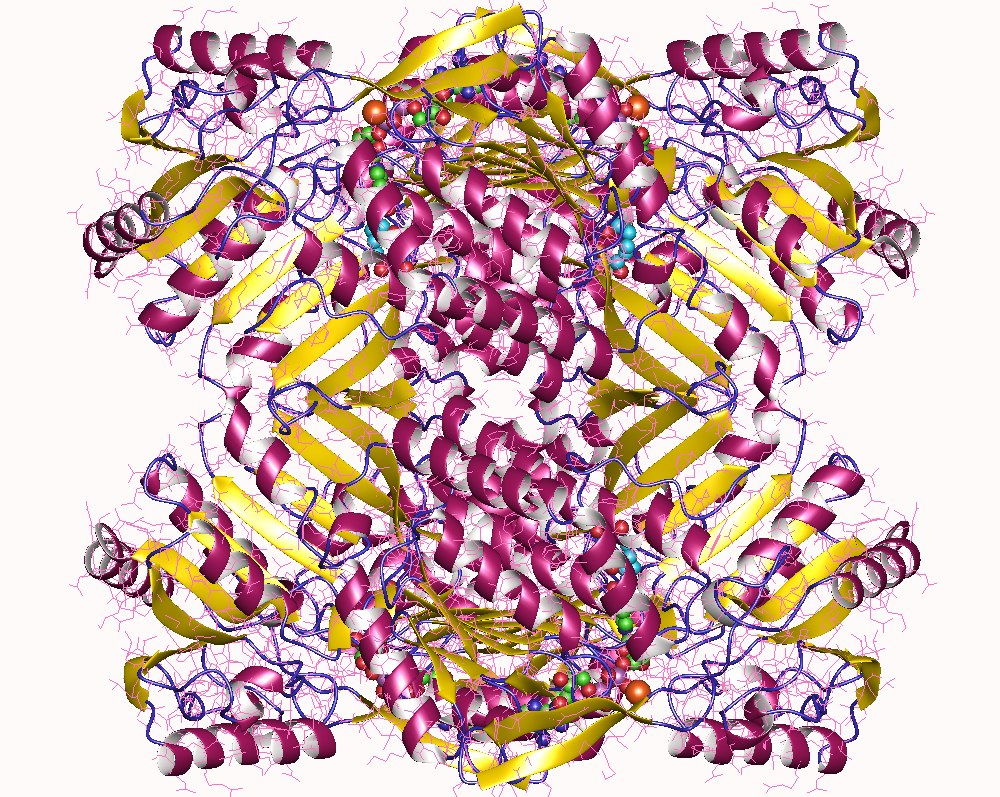
- aminomuconate-semialdehyde dehydrogenase tetramer, Pseudomonas

Identifiers
- EC no.: 1.2.1.32
- CAS no.: 37250-95-6

Databases
- IntEnz: IntEnz view
- BRENDA: BRENDA entry
- ExPASy: NiceZyme view
- KEGG: KEGG entry
- MetaCyc: metabolic pathway
- PRIAM: profile
- PDB structures: RCSB PDB PDBe PDBsum
- Gene Ontology: AmiGO / QuickGO
Search
- PMC: articles
- PubMed: articles
- NCBI: proteins

In enzymology, aminomuconate-semialdehyde dehydrogenase (EC 1.2.1.32) is an enzyme that catalyzes the chemical reaction

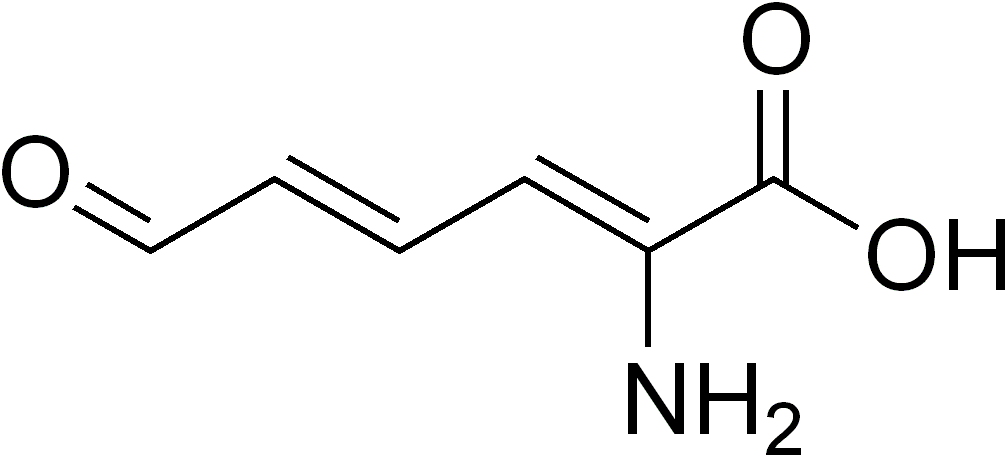
2-Aminomuconic semialdehyde
+ NAD^{+}
H_{2}O
H^{+}
H_{2}O
H^{+}
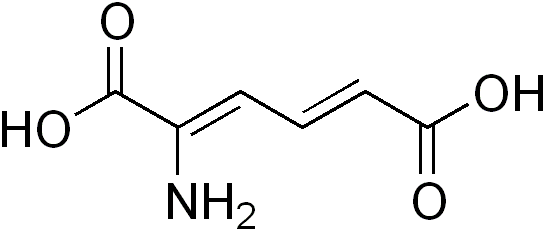
2-Aminomuconic acid
+ NADH

The three substrates of this enzyme are 2-aminomuconic semialdehyde, oxidised nicotinamide adenine dinucleotide (NAD^{+}), and water. Its products are 2-aminomuconic acid, reduced NADH, and a proton.

This enzyme belongs to the family of oxidoreductases, specifically those acting on the aldehyde or oxo group of donor with NAD+ or NADP+ as acceptor. This enzyme participates in 3 metabolic pathways: benzoic acid degradation via hydroxylation, tryptophan metabolism, and the degradation pathway for toluene and xylene.

== Nomenclature ==
The systematic name of this enzyme class is 2-aminomuconate-6-semialdehyde:NAD+ 6-oxidoreductase. Other names in common use include 2-aminomuconate semialdehyde dehydrogenase, 2-hydroxymuconic acid semialdehyde dehydrogenase, 2-hydroxymuconate semialdehyde dehydrogenase, alpha-aminomuconic epsilon-semialdehyde dehydrogenase, alpha-hydroxymuconic epsilon-semialdehyde dehydrogenase, and 2-hydroxymuconic semialdehyde dehydrogenase.
