= Anthranilate 3-hydroxylase =

Anthranilate 3-hydroxylase may refer to:

- Anthranilate 3-monooxygenase (FAD), an enzyme
- Anthranilate 3-monooxygenase, an enzyme
