= 2-Amino-3-carboxymuconic semialdehyde =

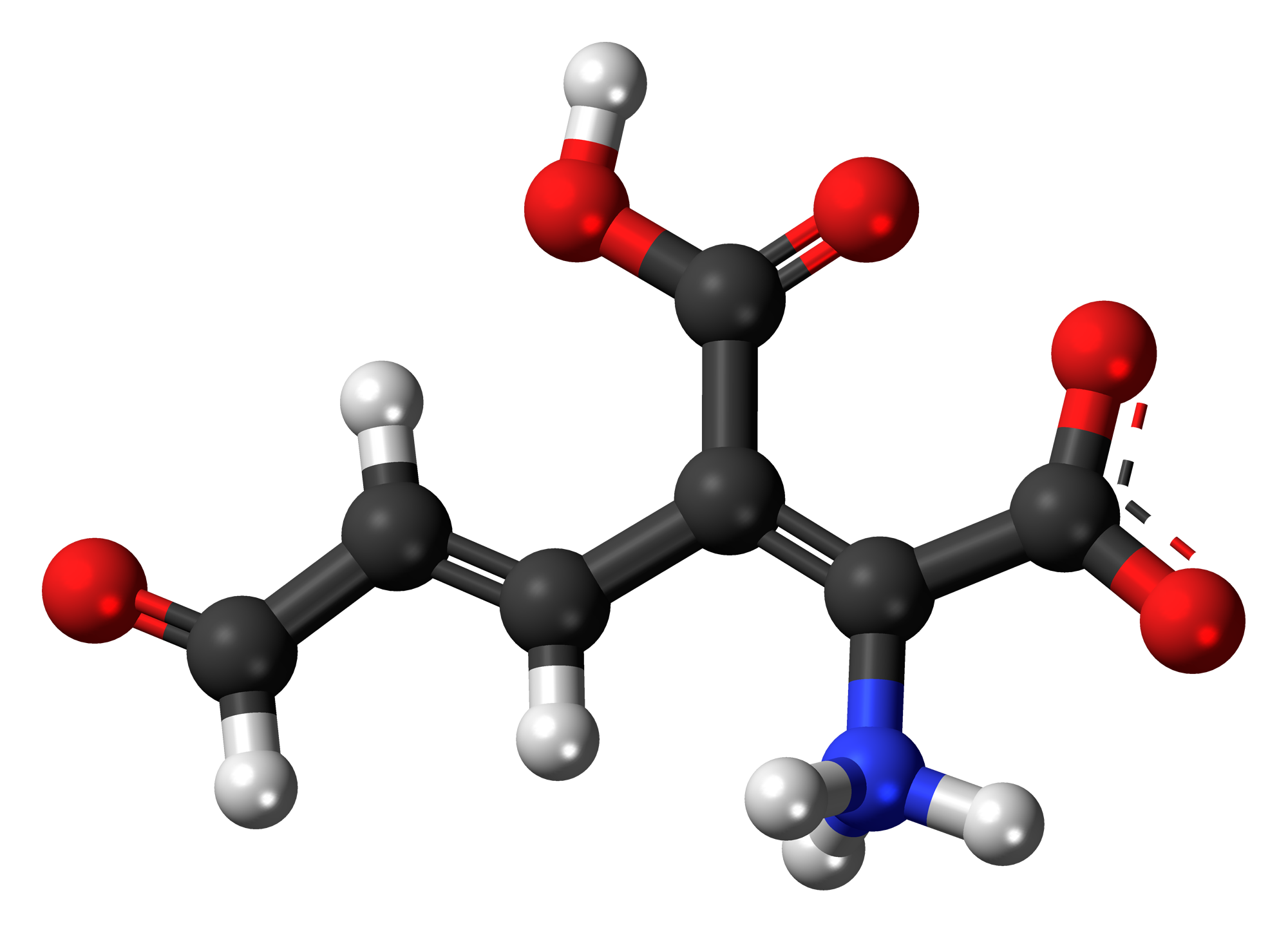

Names
- Preferred IUPAC name (2Z)-2-Amino-3-[(1Z)-3-oxoprop-1-en-1-yl]but-2-enedioic acid

Identifiers
| CAS Number | 16597-58-3 |
| 3D model (JSmol) | Interactive image |
| ChEBI | CHEBI:994 |
| ChemSpider | 4444266 |
| KEGG | C04409 |
| PubChem CID | 5280673 |
| CompTox Dashboard (EPA) | DTXSID10274255 |
- InChI: InChI=1S/C7H7NO5/c8-5(7(12)13)4(6(10)11)2-1-3-9/h1-3H,8H2,(H,10,11)(H,12,13)/b2-1-,5-4- Key: KACPVQQHDVBVFC-OIFXTYEKSA-N
- SMILES: C(=CC(=C(C(=O)O)N)C(=O)O)C=O

Properties
| Chemical formula | C_{7}H_{7}NO_{5} |
| Molar mass | 185.13 g/mol |
| Density | 1.527 g/mL |
| Boiling point | 389 °C (732 °F; 662 K) |

Hazards
| Flash point | 189 °C (372 °F; 462 K) |
- Except where otherwise noted, data are given for materials in their standard state (at 25 °C [77 °F], 100 kPa). Infobox references

2-Amino-3-carboxymuconic semialdehyde is an intermediate in the metabolism of tryptophan in the kynurenine pathway. Quinolinic acid is a neurotoxin formed nonenzymatically from 2-amino-3-carboxymuconic semialdehyde in mammalian tissues. 2-Amino-3-carboxymuconic semialdehyde is enzymatically converted to picolinic acid via 2-aminomuconic semialdehyde.

== Biosynthesis ==
The enzyme 3-hydroxyanthranilate 3,4-dioxygenase uses oxygen to cleave the aromatic ring of 3-hydroxyanthranilic acid, giving 2-amino-3-carboxymuconic semialdehyde.

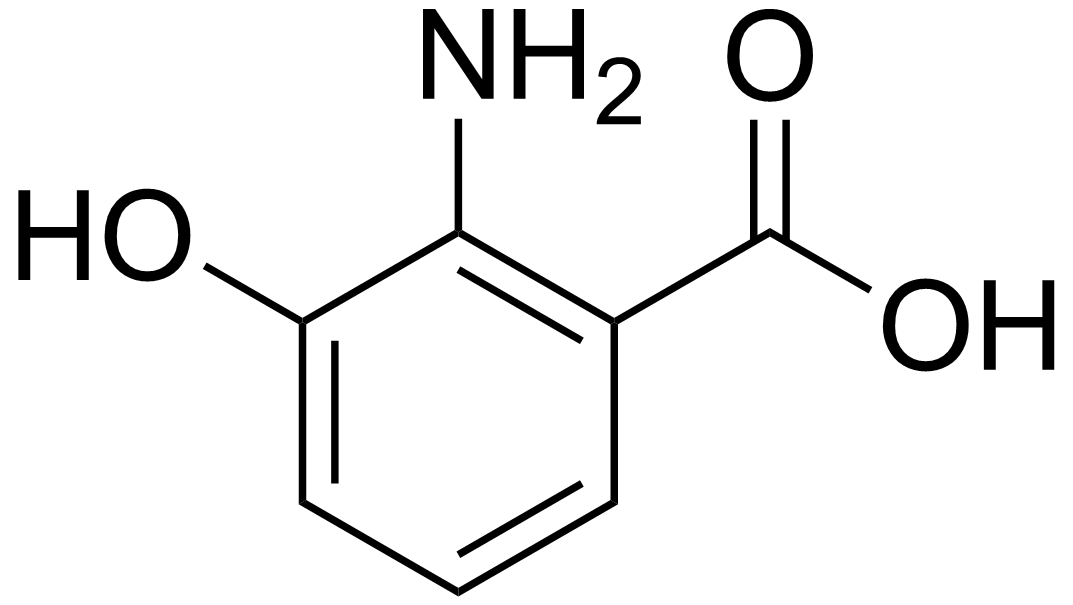
3-Hydroxyanthranilic acid
O_{2}
2-amino-3-carboxymuconic semialdehyde

== Metabolism ==
The kynurenine pathway of tryptophan catabolism leads to nicotinamide adenine dinucleotide and supplies the nicotinic acid component of that cofactor. In this pathway, quinolinic acid is produced spontaneously from the intermediate semialdehyde as its amine cyclises with the aldehyde, losing a molecule of water:

2-amino-3-carboxymuconic semialdehyde
H_{2}O
quinolinic acid

Alternatively, 2-amino-3-carboxymuconic semialdehyde can be acted on by the enzyme aminocarboxymuconate-semialdehyde decarboxylase to give 2-aminomuconic semialdehyde, an unstable open-chain precursor of picolinic acid.

2-Amino-3-carboxymuconic semialdehyde
Enzymic
CO_{2}
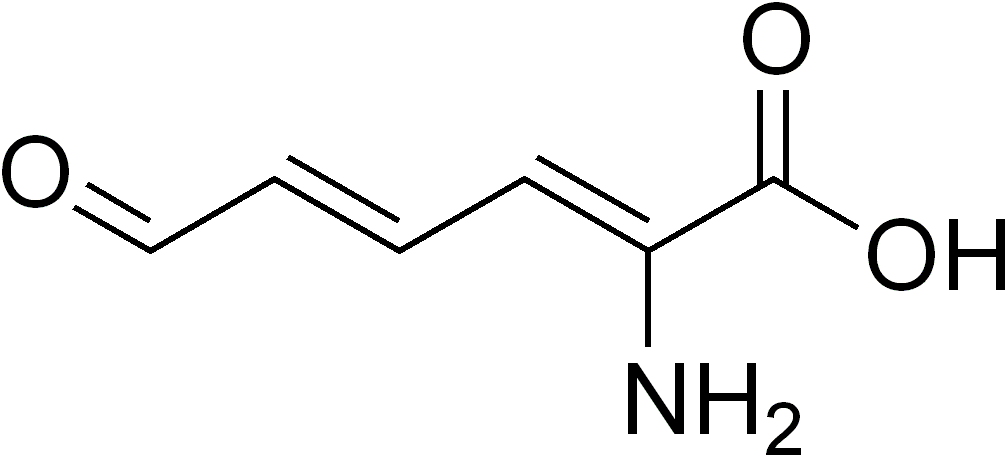
2-Aminomuconic semialdehyde
Spontaneous
H_{2}O
Picolinic acid
