= NBAF =

NBAF can refer to:

- National Bio and Agro-Defense Facility
- National Black Arts Festival
- 2-aminomuconate deaminase, an enzyme
