= HAAO =

Enzyme

Identifiers
- Aliases: HAAO, Haao, 0610007K21Rik, 0610012J07Rik, 3-HAO, 3-HAOxase, 3HAO, HAO, 3-hydroxyanthranilate 3,4-dioxygenase, VCRL1, h3HAO
- External IDs: OMIM: 604521; MGI: 1349444; GeneCards: HAAO
Available structures
| PDB | Ortholog search: PDBe RCSB |
| PDB | List of PDB id codes 2QNK |
Enzyme activity
| EC # | BRENDA | ExPASy | KEGG | MetaCyc |
|---|---|---|---|---|
| 1.13.11.6 | ↗ | ↗ | ↗ | ↗ |

Gene location (Human)
| Chr. | Chromosome 2 (human) |
| Band | 2p21 | Start | 42,767,089 bp |
| Band | 2p21 | End | 42,792,593 bp |

Gene location (Mouse)
| Chr. | Chromosome 17 (mouse) |
| Band | 17|17 E4 | Start | 84,138,585 bp |
| Band | 17|17 E4 | End | 84,155,392 bp |
RNA expression pattern
| Bgee | Human / Mouse (ortholog); Top expressed in: right lobe of liver; Descending thoracic aorta; ascending aorta; mucosa of transverse colon; body of pancreas; right coronary artery; left coronary artery; popliteal artery; tibial arteries; canal of the cervix / Top expressed in: right kidney; left lobe of liver; human kidney; granulocyte; yolk sac; proximal tubule; spleen; blood; mesenteric lymph nodes; embryo; More reference expression data |
| BioGPS | n/a |
Gene ontology
| Molecular function | iron ion binding; 3-hydroxyanthranilate 3,4-dioxygenase activity; dioxygenase activity; metal ion binding; protein binding; electron transfer activity; oxidoreductase activity; ferrous iron binding |
| Cellular component | cytoplasm; cytosol |
| Biological process | pyridine nucleotide biosynthetic process; response to cadmium ion; neuron cellular homeostasis; response to zinc ion; tryptophan catabolic process; electron transport chain; NAD biosynthetic process; quinolinate biosynthetic process; 'de novo' NAD biosynthetic process from tryptophan; anthranilate metabolic process; quinolinate metabolic process |
Sources:Amigo / QuickGO
Orthologs
| Databases | NCBI: entry; OMA: entry |
| Species | Human | Mouse |
| Entrez | 23498 | 107766 |
| Ensembl | ENSG00000162882 | ENSMUSG00000000673 |
| UniProt | P46952 | Q78JT3 |
| RefSeq (mRNA) | NM_012205 | NM_025325 |
| RefSeq (protein) | NP_036337 | NP_079601 |
| Location (UCSC) | Chr 2: 42.77 – 42.79 Mb | Chr 17: 84.14 – 84.16 Mb |
| PubMed search |
- Wikidata
| View/Edit Human | View/Edit Mouse |

3-hydroxyanthranilate 3,4-dioxygenase
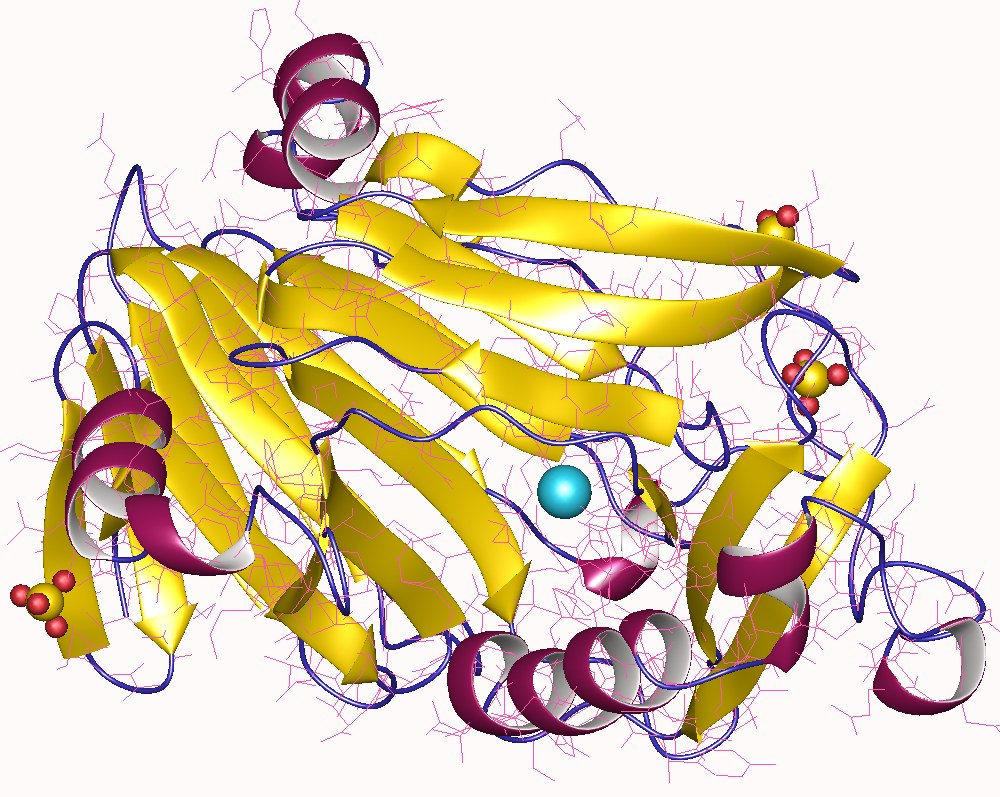
- 3-hydroxyanthranilate 3,4-dioxygenase monomer, Human

Identifiers
- EC no.: 1.13.11.6
- CAS no.: 9029-50-9

Databases
- BRENDA: enzyme data
- ExPASy: NiceZyme view
- KEGG: enzyme entry
- MetaCyc: metabolic pathway
- Rhea: reactions
- PDB structures: RCSB PDB PDBe PDBsum
- Gene Ontology: AmiGO / QuickGO
Search
- PMC: articles
- PubMed: articles
- NCBI: proteins

3-hydroxyanthranilate 3,4-dioxygenase (EC 1.13.11.6) is an enzyme encoded by the HAAO gene that catalyzes the chemical reaction

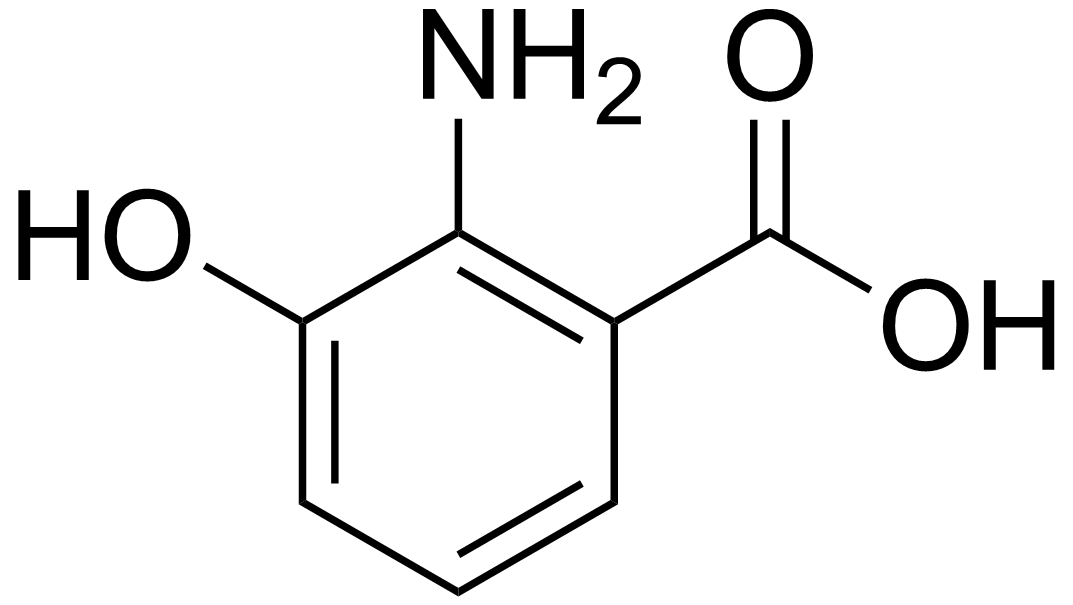
3-Hydroxyanthranilic acid
O_{2}
2-amino-3-carboxymuconic semialdehyde

The two substrates of this enzyme are 3-hydroxyanthranilic acid and oxygen. Its product is 2-amino-3-carboxymuconic semialdehyde.

This enzyme belongs to the family of oxidoreductases, specifically those acting on single donors with O_{2} as oxidant and incorporation of two atoms of oxygen into the substrate (oxygenases). The oxygen incorporated need not be derived from O_{2}.

The systematic name of this enzyme class is 3-hydroxyanthranilate:oxygen 3,4-oxidoreductase (decyclizing). Other names in common use include 3-hydroxyanthranilate oxygenase, 3-hydroxyanthranilic acid oxygenase, 3-hydroxyanthranilic oxygenase, 3-hydroxyanthranilic acid oxidase and 3HAO. This enzyme participates in tryptophan metabolism. It employs one cofactor, iron.

== Structural studies ==
As of late 2007, 6 structures have been solved for this class of enzymes, with PDB accession codes PDB: 1YFU, PDB: 1YFW, PDB: 1YFX, PDB: 1YFY, PDB: 1ZVF, and PDB: 2QNK.h
