= Saccharococcus =

Scientific classification
- Domain: Bacteria
- Kingdom: Bacillati
- Phylum: Bacillota
- Class: Bacilli
- Order: Bacillales
- Family: Bacillaceae
- Genus: Saccharococcus; Nystrand 1984

Type species
- Saccharococcus thermophilus Nystrand 1984

Species
- S. caldoxylosilyticus; S. thermophilus

Genus of bacteria

Saccharococcus is a Gram-positive, aerobic, non-spore-forming, heterotrophic, thermophilic and non-motile genus of bacteria from the family Bacillaceae with one known species (Saccharococcus thermophilus).

== Phylogeny ==
The currently accepted taxonomy is based on the List of Prokaryotic names with Standing in Nomenclature (LPSN) and National Center for Biotechnology Information (NCBI).

16S rRNA based LTP_10_2024

- Saccharococcus
  S. thermophilus

120 marker proteins based GTDB 09-RS220

- Saccharococcus
  - S. caldoxylosilyticus Ahmad et al. 2000
  - S. thermophilus Nystrand 1984
