= Geobacillus toebii =

Scientific classification
- Domain: Bacteria
- Kingdom: Bacillati
- Phylum: Bacillota
- Class: Bacilli
- Order: Bacillales
- Family: Bacillaceae
- Genus: Geobacillus
- Species: G. toebii

Binomial name
- Geobacillus toebii Sung et al. 2002

Species of bacterium

Geobacillus toebii is a thermophilic bacterium first isolated from hay compost. It is aerobic, Gram-positive, motile and rod-shaped, with type strain SK-1(T) (= KCTC 0306BP(T) - DSM 14590(T)).
