= 2-Aminomuconate deaminase =

Class of enzymes

2-aminomuconate deaminase

Identifiers
- EC no.: 3.5.99.5

Databases
- BRENDA: enzyme data
- ExPASy: NiceZyme view
- KEGG: enzyme entry
- MetaCyc: metabolic pathway
- Rhea: reactions
- PDB structures: RCSB PDB PDBe PDBsum
- Gene Ontology: AmiGO / QuickGO
Search
- PMC: articles
- PubMed: articles
- NCBI: proteins

2-aminomuconate deaminase (EC 3.5.99.5) (also known as amnd) is an enzyme characterised from Pseudomonas pseudoalcaligenes that catalyzes the hydrolysis of the 2-aminomuconic acid isomer, (2E,4Z)-2-aminohexa-2,4-dienedioic acid, to (Z)-5-oxohex-2-enedioic acid and ammonia:

(2E,4Z)-2-aminohexa-2,4-dienedioic acid
H_{2}O
NH_{3}
(Z)-5-oxohex-2-enedioic acid

The reaction is part of the catabolism of nitrobenzene via 2-aminophenol and also of 2-nitrobenzoic acid. It is also involved in the pathway for breakdown of the amino acid, tryptophan.

This enzyme is a hydrolase, one acting on carbon-nitrogen bonds other than peptide bonds. The systematic name of this enzyme class is 2-aminomuconate aminohydrolase.
