= Aminocarboxymuconate-semialdehyde decarboxylase =

Class of enzymes

aminocarboxymuconate-semialdehyde decarboxylase
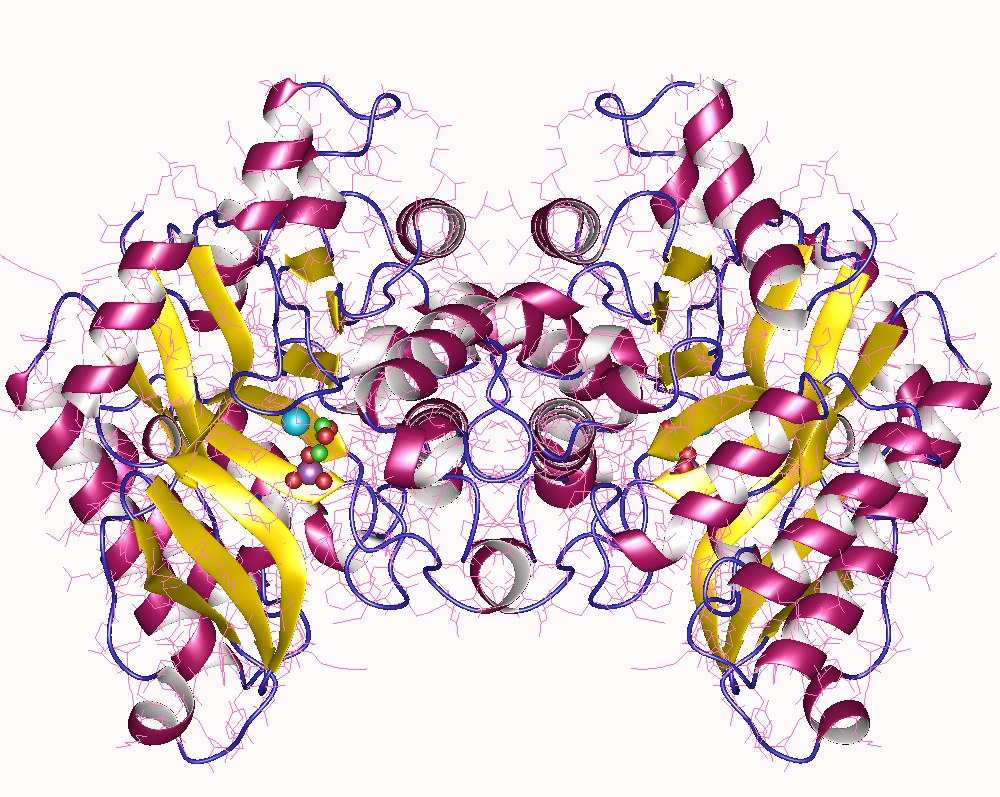
- aminocarboxymuconate-semialdehyde decarboxylase dimer, Human

Identifiers
- EC no.: 4.1.1.45
- CAS no.: 37289-47-7
- Alt. names: ACMSD

Databases
- BRENDA: enzyme data
- ExPASy: NiceZyme view
- KEGG: enzyme entry
- MetaCyc: metabolic pathway
- Rhea: reactions
- PDB structures: RCSB PDB PDBe PDBsum
- Gene Ontology: AmiGO / QuickGO
Search
- PMC: articles
- PubMed: articles
- NCBI: proteins

The enzyme aminocarboxymuconate-semialdehyde decarboxylase (EC 4.1.1.45) catalyzes the decarboxylation reaction:

2-Amino-3-carboxymuconic semialdehyde
CO_{2}
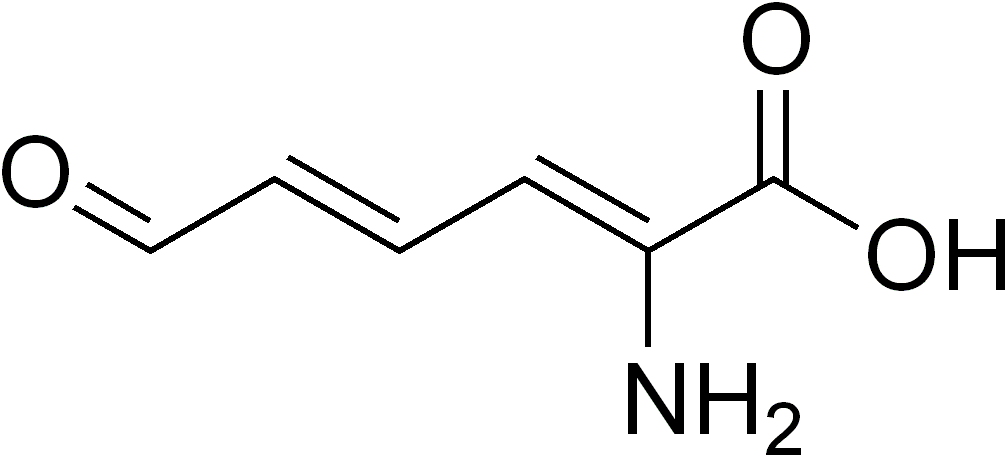
2-Aminomuconic semialdehyde

The product spontaneously ring-closes to picolinic acid, with loss of water.

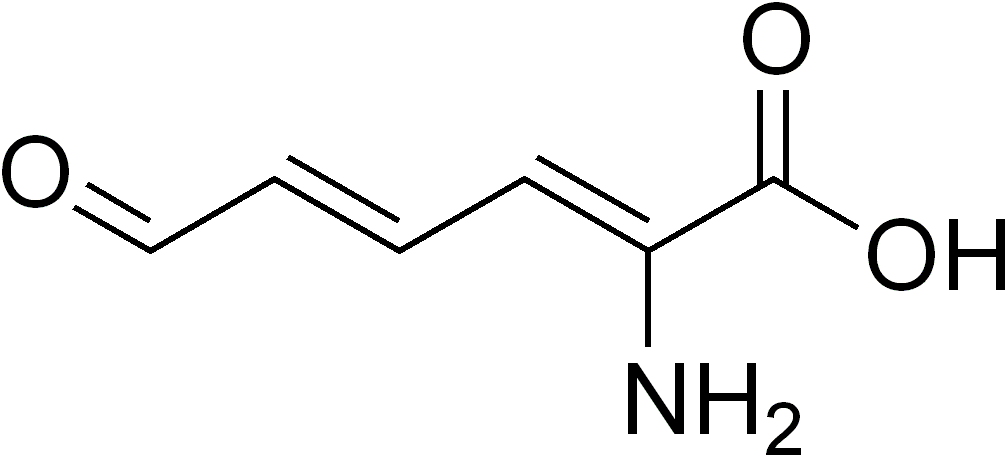
2-Aminomuconic semialdehyde
H_{2}O
Picolinic acid

This enzyme is a lyase, specifically a carboxy-lyase, which cleave carbon-carbon bonds. This enzyme is part of the kynurenine pathway in tryptophan metabolism, leading to picolinic acid or quinolinic acid. It has been identified as a marker in nonverbal autism.

== Nomenclature ==
The systematic name of this enzyme class is 2-amino-3-(3-oxoprop-1-en-1-yl)but-2-enedioate carboxy-lyase (2-aminomuconate-semialdehyde-forming). Other names in common use include picolinic acid carboxylase, picolinic acid decarboxylase, alpha-amino-beta-carboxymuconate-epsilon-semialdehade decarboxylase, alpha-amino-beta-carboxymuconate-epsilon-semialdehyde, beta-decarboxylase, 2-amino-3-(3-oxoprop-2-enyl)but-2-enedioate carboxy-lyase, and 2-amino-3-(3-oxoprop-1-en-1-yl)but-2-enedioate carboxy-lyase.
