= Geobacillus jurassicus =

Scientific classification
- Domain: Bacteria
- Kingdom: Bacillati
- Phylum: Bacillota
- Class: Bacilli
- Order: Bacillales
- Family: Bacillaceae
- Genus: Geobacillus
- Species: G. jurassicus

Binomial name
- Geobacillus jurassicus Nazina et al. 2005 emend. Coorevits et al. 2012

Species of bacterium

Geobacillus jurassicus is a thermophilic bacterium first isolated from a high-temperature petroleum reservoir. It is aerobic, gram-positive, rod-shaped, moderately thermophilic, chemoorganotrophic, and endospore-forming, with type species DS1^{T} (=VKM B-2301^{T}, =DSM 15726^{T}).
