= Anthranilate 3-monooxygenase (FAD) =

Identifiers
- EC no.: 1.14.14.8

Databases
- IntEnz: IntEnz view
- BRENDA: BRENDA entry
- ExPASy: NiceZyme view
- KEGG: KEGG entry
- MetaCyc: metabolic pathway
- PRIAM: profile
- PDB structures: RCSB PDB PDBe PDBsum
Search
- PMC: articles
- PubMed: articles
- NCBI: proteins

Anthranilate 3-monooxygenase (FAD) (EC 1.14.14.8, anthranilate 3-hydroxylase, anthranilate hydroxylase) is an enzyme with systematic name anthranilate,FAD:oxygen oxidoreductase (3-hydroxylating). This enzyme catalyses the following chemical reaction

Anthranilic acid
+ FADH_{2}
O_{2}
H_{2}O
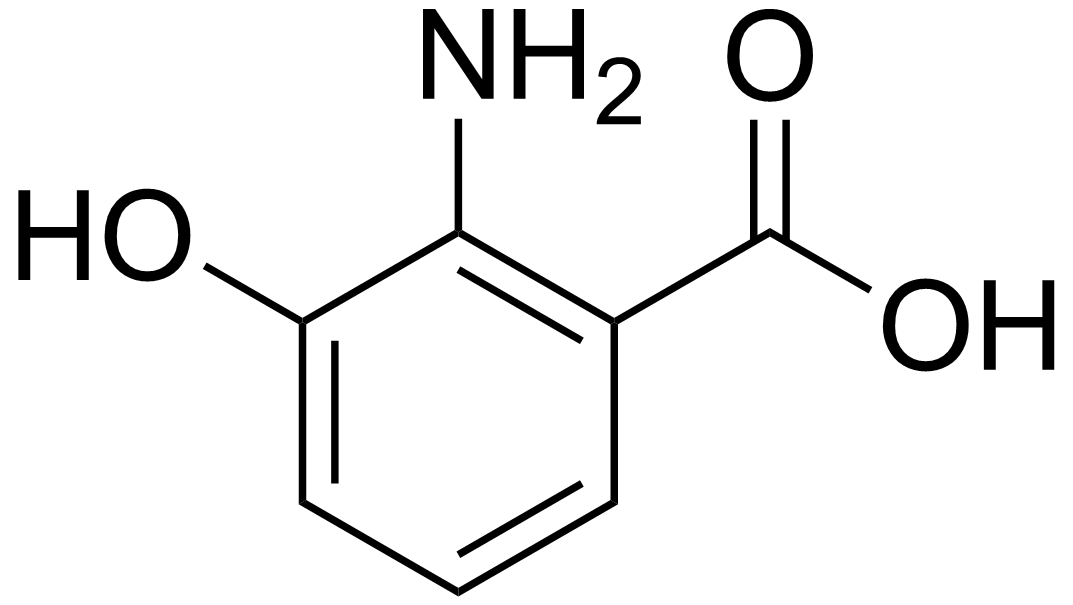
3-Hydroxyanthranilic acid
+ FAD

The three substrates of this enzyme are anthranilic acid, reduced flavin adenine dinucleotide (FADH_{2}), and oxygen. It products are 3-hydroxyanthranilic acid, FAD, and water. The bacterial enzyme from Geobacillus thermodenitrificans participates in tryptophan degradation.
