= Pyridinecarboxylic acid =

A pyridinecarboxylic acid is any member of a group of organic compounds which are monocarboxylic derivatives of pyridine. Pyridinecarboxylic acid comes in three isomers:

- Picolinic acid (2-pyridinecarboxylic acid)
- Nicotinic acid (3-pyridinecarboxylic acid), also known as Niacin
- Isonicotinic acid (4-pyridinecarboxylic acid)

Common Name	Picolinic acid	Nicotinic acid/Niacin	Isonicotinic acid
Systematic Name	2-pyridinecarboxylic acid	3-pyridinecarboxylic acid	4-pyridinecarboxylic acid
Structural Formula			
CAS Registry Number	98-98-6	59-67-6	55-22-1

All isomers share the molecular weight 123,11 g/mol and the chemical formula C_{6}H_{5}NO_{2}.

== See also ==
- Pyridinedicarboxylic acid
