= Zinc picolinate =

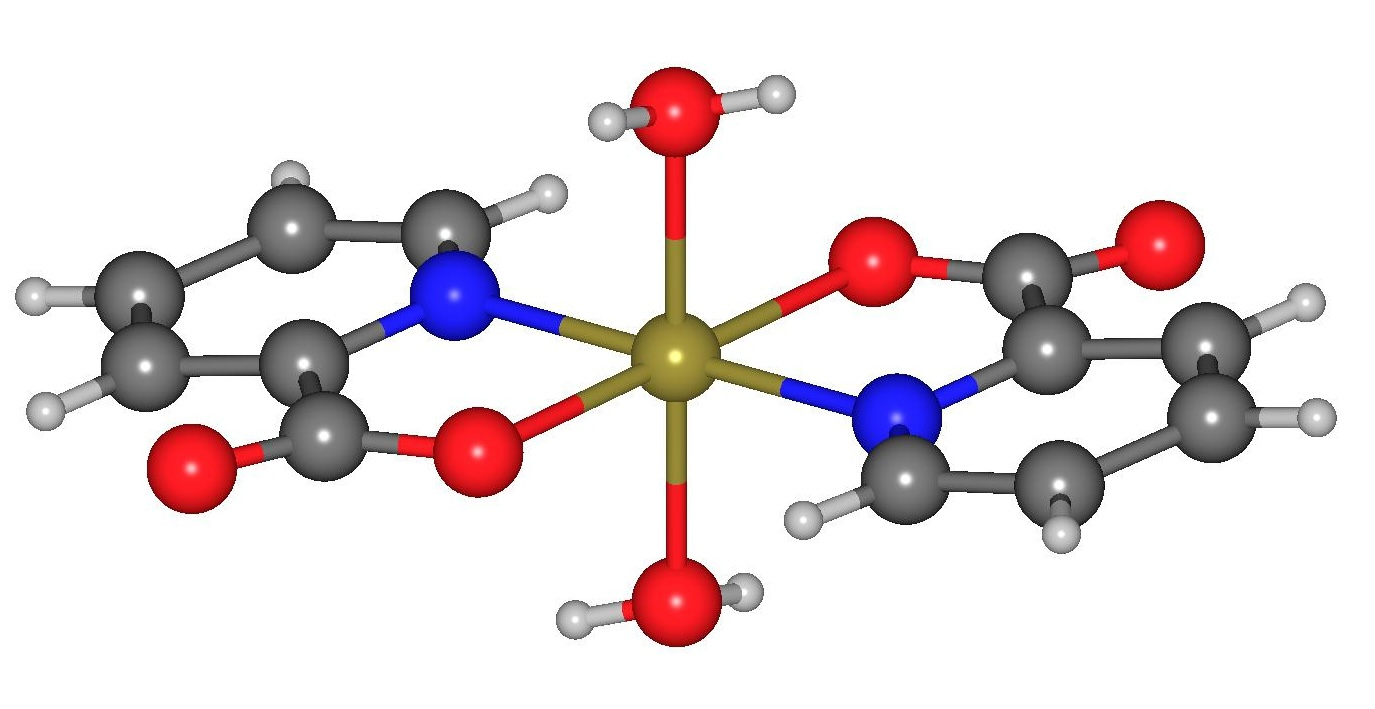

Identifiers
CAS Number	17949-65-4
3D model (JSmol)	Interactive image
ChemSpider	8080400
ECHA InfoCard	100.132.913
PubChem CID	9904746
UNII	ALO92O31SE
CompTox Dashboard (EPA)	DTXSID60170814
- InChI: InChI=1S/2C6H5NO2.Zn/c2*8-6(9)5-3-1-2-4-7-5;/h2*1-4H,(H,8,9);/q;;+2/p-2 Key: NHVUUBRKFZWXRN-UHFFFAOYSA-L
- SMILES: C1=CC=NC(=C1)C(=O)[O-].C1=CC=NC(=C1)C(=O)[O-].[Zn+2]

Properties
Chemical formula	C_{12}H_{12}N_{2}O_{6}Zn
Molar mass	345.62 g·mol^{−1}

Hazards
- GHS labelling
Pictograms	(GHS07: Exclamation mark) (GHS09: Environmental hazard)
Signal word	Warning
Hazard statements	H302, H315, H319, H335, H410
Precautionary statements	P261, P264, P270, P271, P273, P280, P301+P312, P302+P352, P304+P340, P305+P351+P338, P312, P321, P330, P332+P313, P337+P313, P362, P391, P403+P233, P405, P501
- Except where otherwise noted, data are given for materials in their standard state (at 25 °C [77 °F], 100 kPa). Infobox references

Zinc picolinate (or ZnPic) is the zinc coordination complex derived from picolinic acid and zinc(II). It has the formula Zn(NC_{5}H_{4}CO_{2})_{2}(H_{2}O)_{2}. The complex adopts an octahedral molecular geometry, containing two bidentate picolinate ligands (conjugate base of picolinic acid) and two aquo ligands. Additionally, two water of crystallization are present, thus the compound crystallizes with the formula Zn(NC_{5}H_{4}CO_{2})_{2}(H_{2}O)_{2}·2H_{2}O. It is a colorless solid.

== Related compounds ==
Other zinc(II) complexes of picolinic acid have been described. Isostructural with the zinc complex are M(NC_{5}H_{4}CO_{2})_{2}(H_{2}O)_{2}·2H_{2}O (M = Co and Ni).

== Dietary supplement ==
Zinc picolinate has been used as a dietary zinc supplement.
