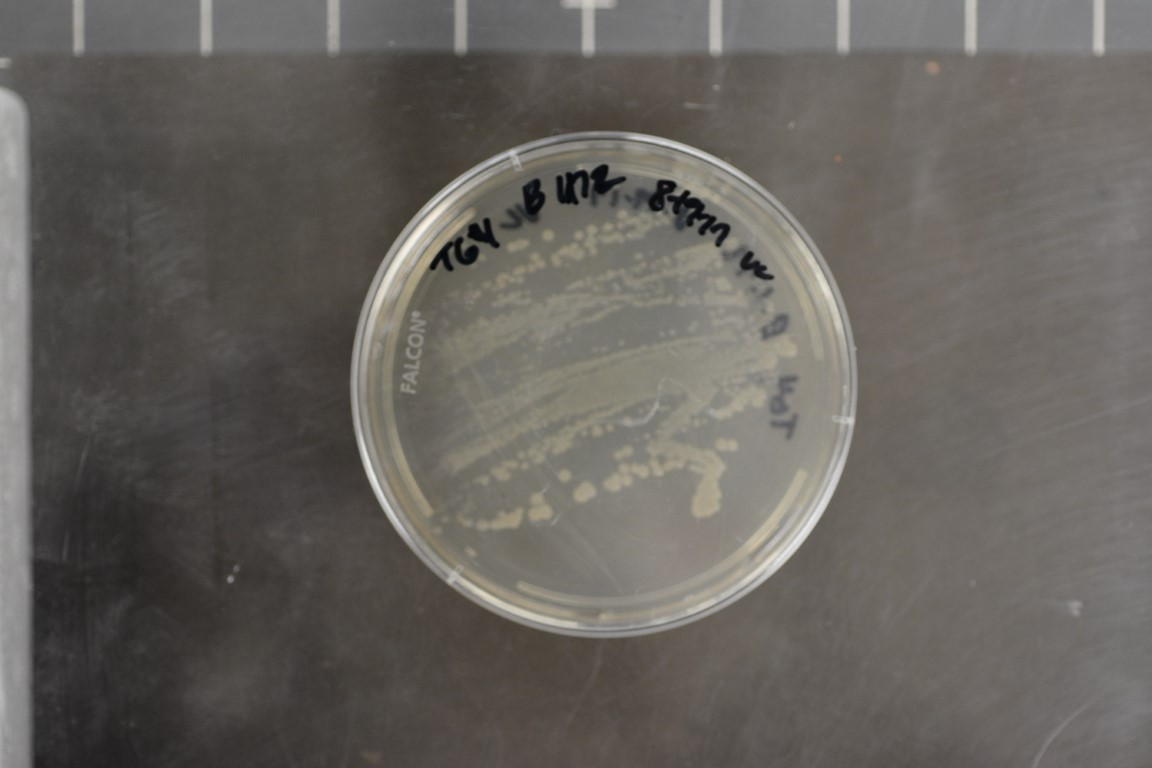

Scientific classification
- Domain: Bacteria
- Kingdom: Bacillati
- Phylum: Bacillota
- Class: Bacilli
- Order: Caryophanales
- Family: Bacillaceae
- Genus: Geobacillus
- Species: G. stearothermophilus

Binomial name
- Geobacillus stearothermophilus (Donk 1920) Nazina et al. 2001

= Geobacillus stearothermophilus =

Species of bacterium

Geobacillus stearothermophilus (previously Bacillus stearothermophilus) is a rod-shaped, Gram-positive bacterium and a member of the phylum Bacillota. The bacterium is a thermophile and is widely distributed in soil, hot springs, ocean sediment, and is a cause of spoilage in food products. It will grow within a temperature range of 30–75 °C. Some strains are capable of oxidizing carbon monoxide aerobically. It is commonly used as a challenge organism for sterilization validation studies and periodic check of sterilization cycles. The biological indicator contains spores of the organism on filter paper inside a vial. After sterilizing, the cap is closed, an ampule of growth medium inside of the vial is crushed and the whole vial is incubated. A color and/or turbidity change indicates the results of the sterilization process; no change indicates that the sterilization conditions were achieved, otherwise the growth of the spores indicates that the sterilization process has not been met. Fluorescent-tagged strains, known as rapid-read BIs, are becoming more common to verify sterilization, since the visible fluorescence appears in about one-tenth the time needed for pH-indicator color change and an inexpensive light sensor can detect the growing colonies.

It was first described in 1920 as Bacillus stearothermophilus, but, together with Bacillus thermoglucosidasius, it was reclassified as a member of the genus Geobacillus in 2001.

== Applications in molecular biology ==
=== DNA polymerase ===
DNA polymerase I

Identifiers
- Organism: Geobacillus stearothermophilus
- Symbol: PolA
- Orthologs: OMA: entry
- PDB: 2XY5
- UniProt: E1C9K5
Search for
- Structures: Swiss-model
- Domains: InterPro

Thermostable Group II Intron Reverse Transcriptase GsI-IIC

Identifiers
- Organism: Geobacillus stearothermophilus
- Symbol: TRT
- Orthologs: OMA: entry
- PDB: 6AR1
- UniProt: E2GM63
Search for
- Structures: Swiss-model
- Domains: InterPro

Recently, a DNA polymerase derived from these bacteria, Bst polymerase, has become important in molecular biology applications.

Bst polymerase has a helicase-like activity, making it able to unwind DNA strands. Its optimum functional temperature is between 60 and 65 °C and it is denatured at temperatures above 70 °C. These features make it useful in loop-mediated isothermal amplification (LAMP). LAMP is similar to the polymerase chain reaction (PCR) but does not require the high temperature (96 °C) step required to denature DNA.

=== Reverse transcriptase ===
In 2013, a thermostable group II intron reverse transcriptase (TGIRT), GsI-IIC-MRF, from G. stearothermophilus was found to retain activity up to 70 °C and to exhibit high processivity and a low error rate. These properties make this enzyme useful for reverse transcribing long and/or highly structured RNA molecules. A method for determining RNA secondary structure, DMS-MaPseq, uses this enzyme because it converts normal RNA to DNA accurately but introduces mutations at unpaired bases that have been methylated by dimethyl sulfate, and the mutations can be identified via sequencing.
