= 2-Aminomuconic semialdehyde =

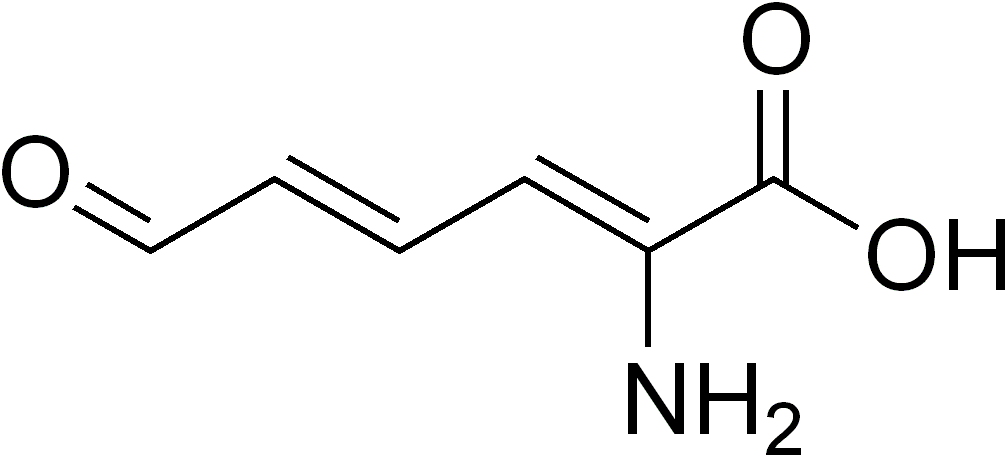
- Skeletal formula

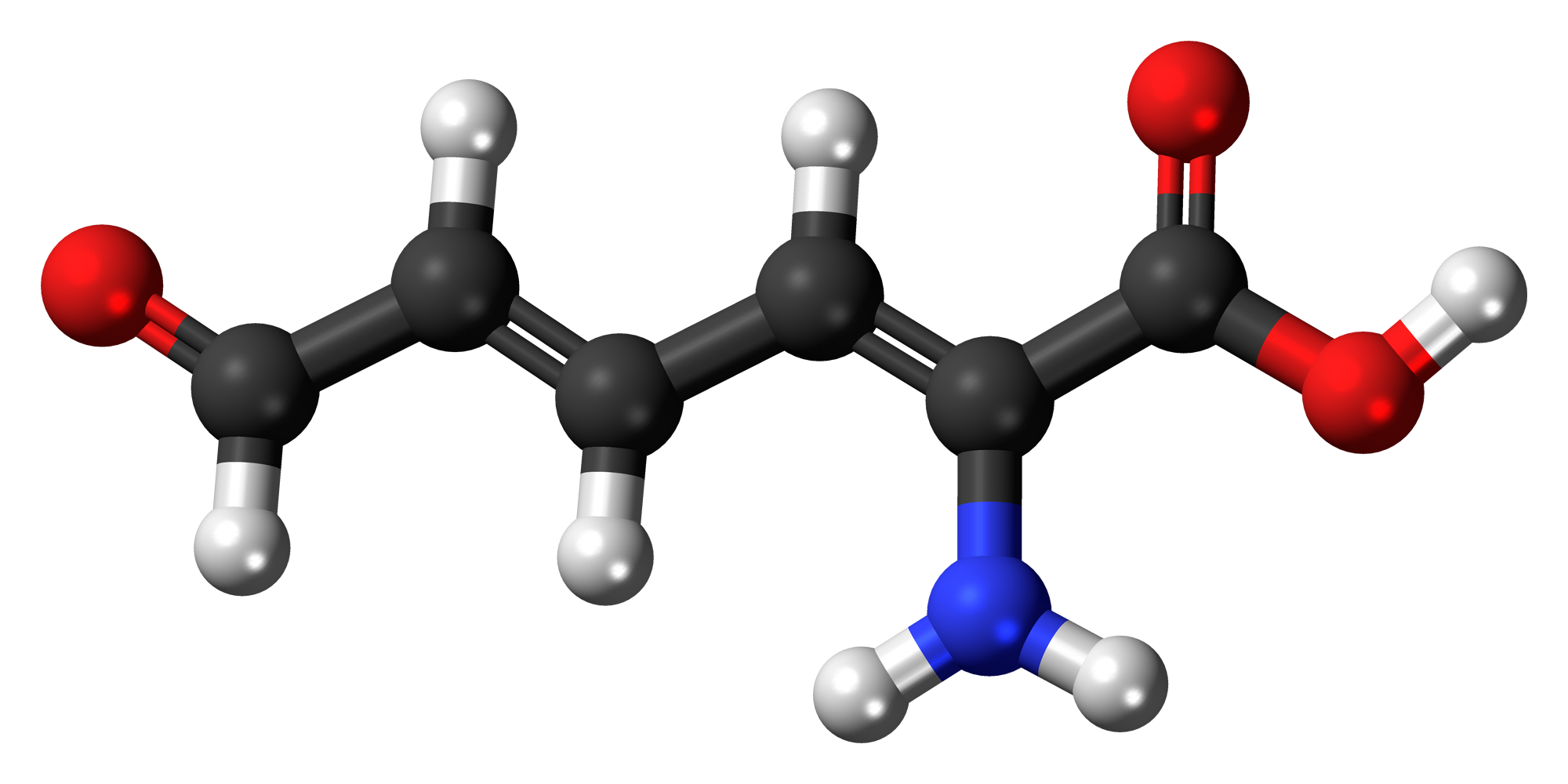
- Ball-and-stick model

Names
- Preferred IUPAC name (2Z,4E)-2-Amino-6-oxohexa-2,4-dienoic acid

Identifiers
CAS Number	150994-59-5
3D model (JSmol)	Interactive image
ChEBI	CHEBI:15745
ChemSpider	4444230
PubChem CID	30
- InChI: InChI=1S/C6H7NO3/c7-5(6(9)10)3-1-2-4-8/h1-4H,7H2,(H,9,10)/b2-1-,5-3+ Key: QCGTZPZKJPTAEP-REDYYMJGSA-N
- SMILES: C(=CC=O)C=C(C(=O)O)N

Properties
Chemical formula	C_{6}H_{7}NO_{3}
Molar mass	141.12 g/mol
- Except where otherwise noted, data are given for materials in their standard state (at 25 °C [77 °F], 100 kPa). Infobox references

2-Aminomuconic semialdehyde is a metabolite of tryptophan which is an unstable open-chain biochemical precursor of picolinic acid.

== Biochemistry ==
2-Aminomuconic semialdehyde is an intermediate in the kynurenine pathway of tryptophan metabolism, which leads to picolinic acid or quinolinic acid. The enzyme aminocarboxymuconate-semialdehyde decarboxylase produces it from 2-amino-3-carboxymuconic semialdehyde, a compound which would form quinolinic acid in the absence of that enzyme.

2-Amino-3-carboxymuconic semialdehyde
CO_{2}
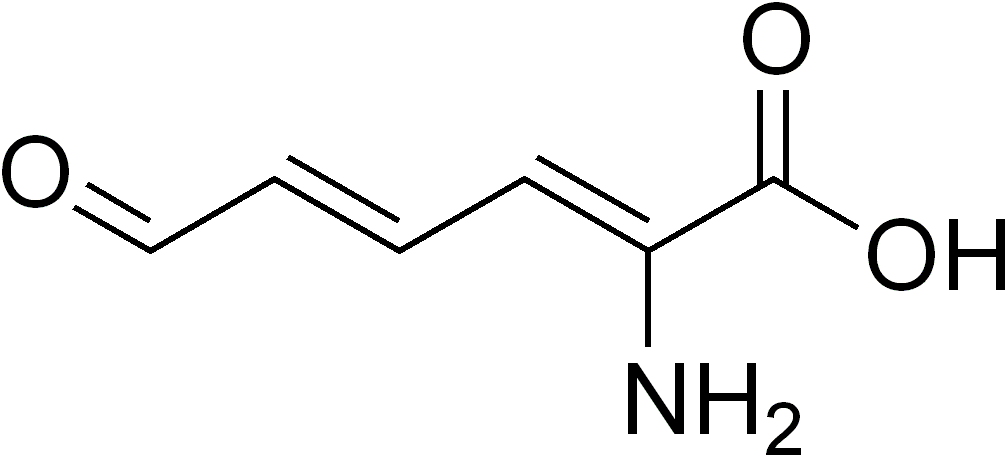
2-Aminomuconic semialdehyde

2-Aminomuconic semialdehyde itself is chemically unstable and spontaneously ring-closes to picolinic acid, with loss of water.

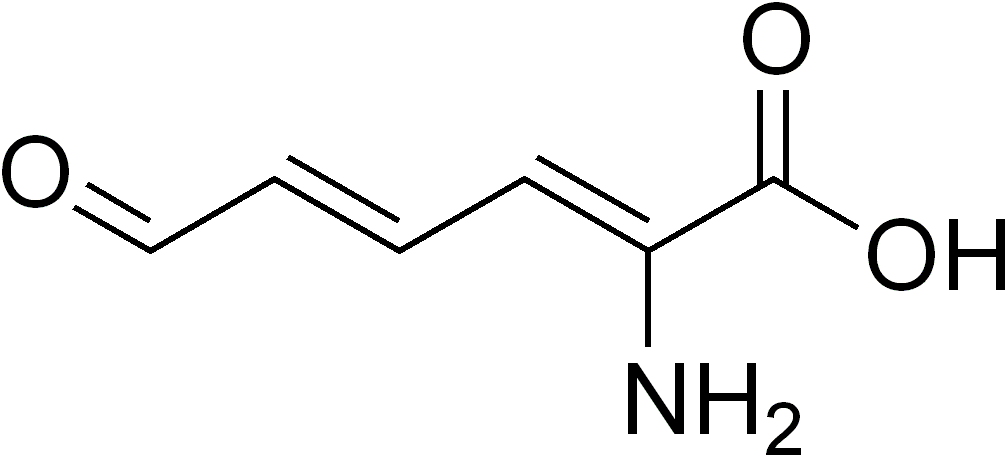
2-Aminomuconic semialdehyde
H_{2}O
Picolinic acid

== See also ==
- Muconic acid
- Ommochrome
