= Thermolongibacillus altinsuensis =

Scientific classification
- Domain: Bacteria
- Kingdom: Bacillati
- Phylum: Bacillota
- Class: Bacilli
- Order: Bacillales
- Family: Bacillaceae
- Genus: Thermolongibacillus
- Species: T. altinsuensis

Binomial name
- Thermolongibacillus altinsuensis Cihan et al. 2014

Type strain
- DSM 24979, E265, NCIMB 14850

Species of bacterium

Thermolongibacillus altinsuensis is a Gram-positive, aerobic, endospore-forming and motile bacterium from the genus of Thermolongibacillus which has been isolated from sediments from the Altinsu hot spring in Nevşehir, Turkey.
