= Thermolongibacillus =

Scientific classification
- Domain: Bacteria
- Kingdom: Bacillati
- Phylum: Bacillota
- Class: Bacilli
- Order: Bacillales
- Family: Bacillaceae
- Genus: Thermolongibacillus; Cihan et al. 2014

Type species
- Thermolongibacillus altinsuensis Cihan et al. 2014

Species
- T. altinsuensis; T. kozakliensis

Genus of bacteria

Thermolongibacillus is a genus of bacteria from the family Bacillaceae.

== Phylogeny ==
The currently accepted taxonomy is based on the List of Prokaryotic names with Standing in Nomenclature (LPSN) and National Center for Biotechnology Information (NCBI).

16S rRNA based LTP_10_2024

- Thermolongibacillus
  - T. altinsuensis Cihan et al. 2014
  - T. kozakliensis Cihan et al. 2014

120 marker proteins based GTDB 09-RS220

- Thermolongibacillus
  T. altinsuensis
