= Parageobacillus caldoxylosilyticus =

Scientific classification
- Domain: Bacteria
- Kingdom: Bacillati
- Phylum: Bacillota
- Class: Bacilli
- Order: Bacillales
- Family: Bacillaceae
- Genus: Parageobacillus
- Species: P. caldoxylosilyticus

Binomial name
- Parageobacillus caldoxylosilyticus Ahmad et al. 2000

Type strain
- S1812

Synonyms
- Geobacillus caldoxylosilyticus Saccharococcus caldoxylolyticus Saccharococcus caldoxylosilyticus

Species of bacterium

Parageobacillus caldoxylosilyticus is a Gram-positive, rod-shaped, thermophilic and xylanolytic bacterium from the genus Parageobacillus.
