= Isonicotinic acid =

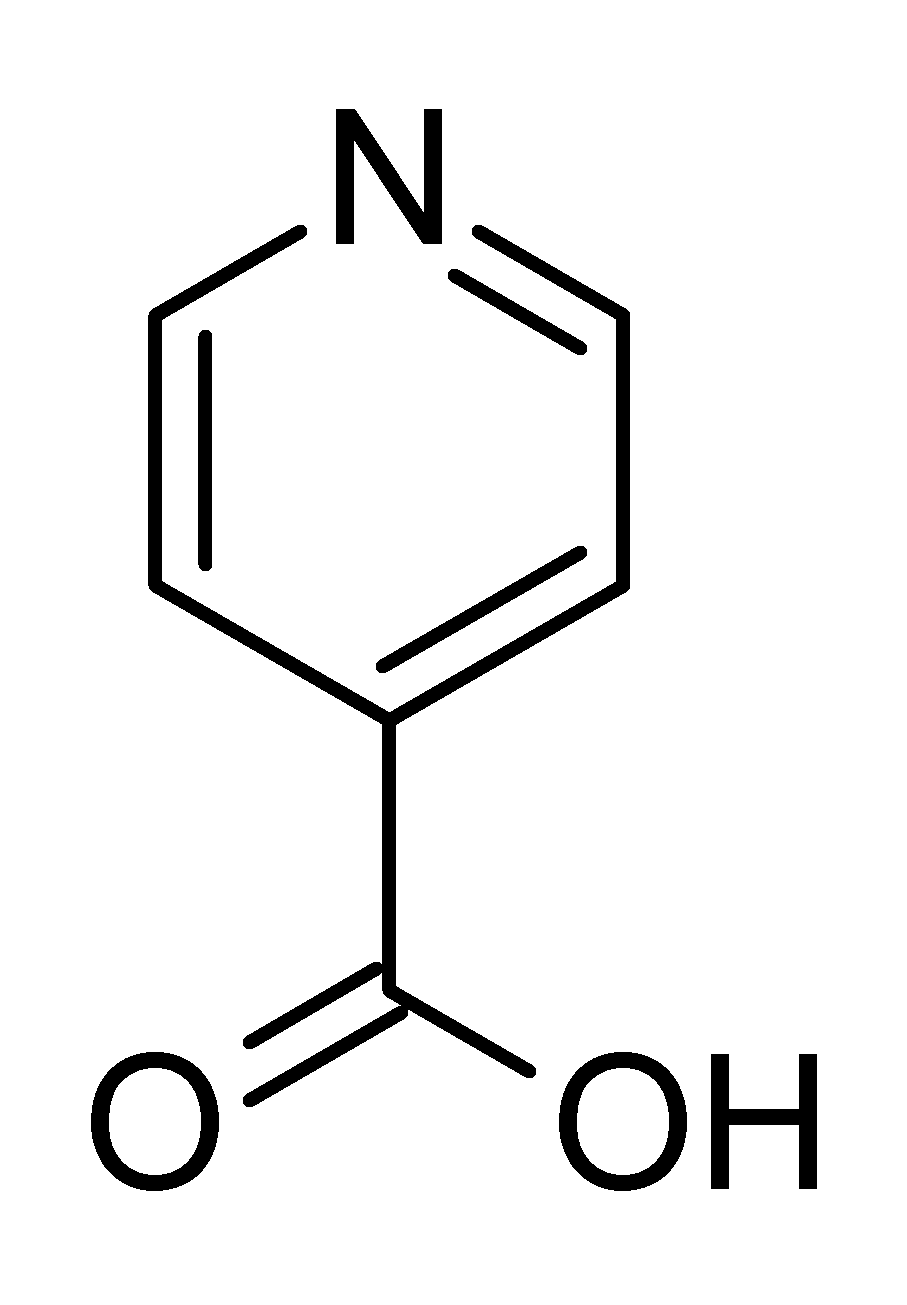
Skeletal formula
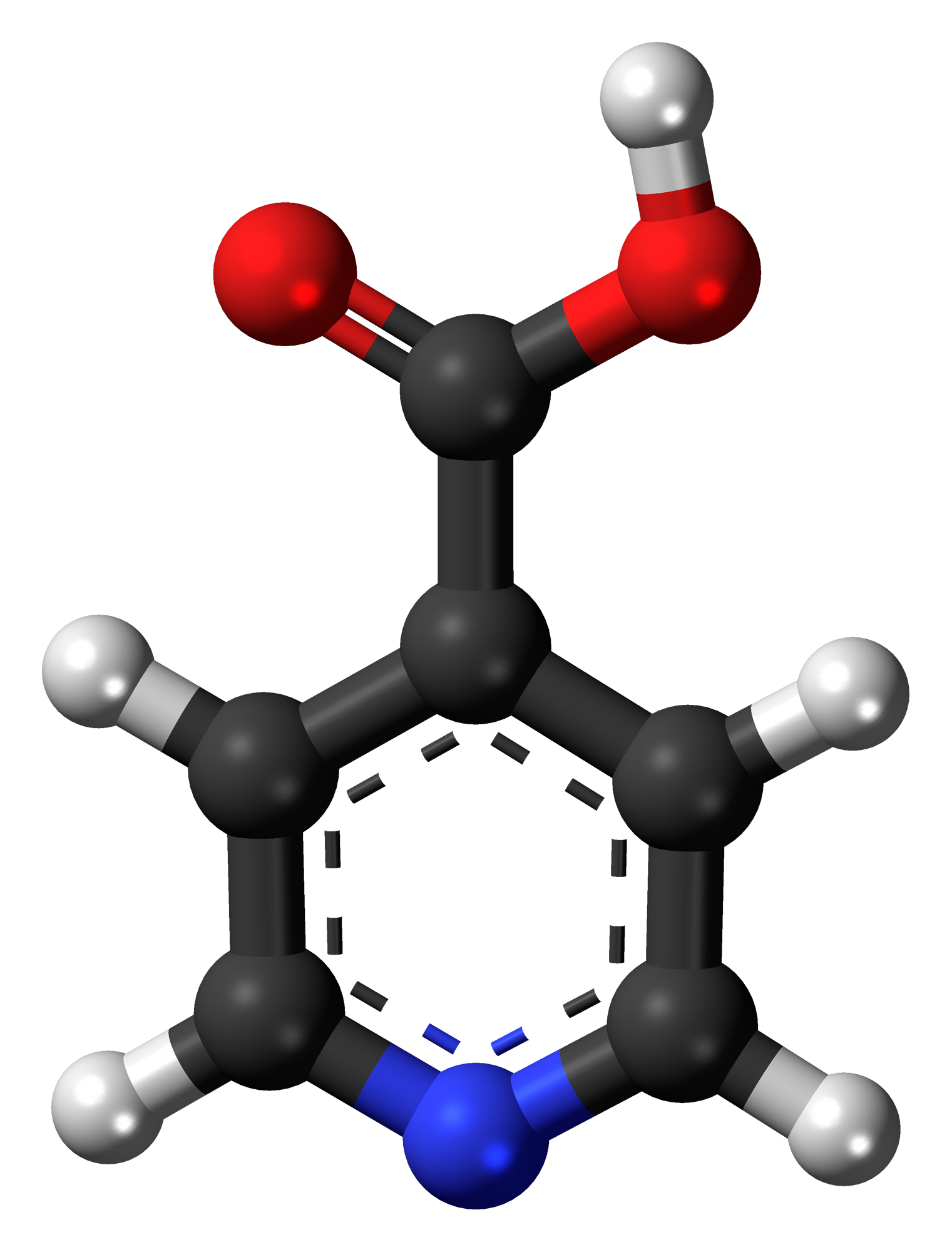
Ball-and-stick model

Names
- Preferred IUPAC name Pyridine-4-carboxylic acid
- Other names Isonicotinic acid 4-Pyridinecarboxylic acid p-Pyridinecarboxylic acid 4-Picolinic acid

Identifiers
CAS Number	55-22-1
3D model (JSmol)	Interactive image
ChEBI	CHEBI:6032
ChEMBL	ChEMBL1203
ChemSpider	5709
ECHA InfoCard	100.000.208
KEGG	C07446
PubChem CID	5922
UNII	Y8SYN761TQ
CompTox Dashboard (EPA)	DTXSID8020757
- InChI: InChI=1S/C6H5NO2/c8-6(9)5-1-3-7-4-2-5/h1-4H,(H,8,9) Key: TWBYWOBDOCUKOW-UHFFFAOYSA-N; InChI=1/C6H5NO2/c8-6(9)5-1-3-7-4-2-5/h1-4H,(H,8,9) Key: TWBYWOBDOCUKOW-UHFFFAOYAV
- SMILES: c1cnccc1C(=O)O

Properties
Chemical formula	C_{6}H_{5}NO_{2}
Molar mass	123.111 g·mol^{−1}
Appearance	White to off-white crystalline solid
Density	Solid
Melting point	310 °C (590 °F; 583 K) (sublimes)

Hazards
NFPA 704 (fire diamond)	3 1 0
Safety data sheet (SDS)	http://datasheets.scbt.com/sc-250188.pdf

Related compounds
Related compounds	nicotinic acid, pyridine isoniazid
- Except where otherwise noted, data are given for materials in their standard state (at 25 °C [77 °F], 100 kPa). verify (what is ?) Infobox references

Isonicotinic acid or pyridine-4-carboxylic acid is an organic compound with the formula C_{5}H_{4}N(CO_{2}H). It is a derivative of pyridine with a carboxylic acid substituent at the 4-position. It is an isomer of picolinic acid and nicotinic acid, which have the carboxyl group at the 2- and 3-position respectively compared to the 4-position for isonicotinic acid.

== Production ==
On a commercial scale, isonicotinic acid, like other pyridine carboxylic acid is produced by ammoxidation of 4-picoline (4-methylpyridine) followed by hydrolysis of the resulting nitrile:

NC_{5}H_{4}CH_{3} + 1.5 O_{2} + NH_{3} → NC_{5}H_{4}C≡N + 3 H_{2}O
NC_{5}H_{4}C≡N + 2 H_{2}O → NC_{5}H_{4}CO_{2}H + NH_{3}

It is also produced by oxidation of 4-picoline with nitric acid.

== Derivatives ==
Isonicotinic acids is a term loosely used for derivatives of isonicotinic acid. Hydrazide derivatives include isoniazid, iproniazid, and nialamide. Amide and ester derivatives include ethionamide and dexamethasone isonicotinate.

Its conjugate base forms coordination polymers and MOFs by binding metal ions through both the N and carboxylate.

== See also ==
- Pyridinecarboxylic acids
