= Picolinic acid =

Pyridine-2-carboxylic acid; bidentate chelating agent

Names
- Preferred IUPAC name Pyridine-2-carboxylic acid
- Other names Picolinic acid

Identifiers
CAS Number	98-98-6
3D model (JSmol)	Interactive image
ChEBI	CHEBI:28747
ChEMBL	ChEMBL72628
ChemSpider	993
ECHA InfoCard	100.002.472
KEGG	C10164
PubChem CID	1018
UNII	QZV2W997JQ
CompTox Dashboard (EPA)	DTXSID7031903
- InChI: InChI=1S/C6H5NO2/c8-6(9)5-3-1-2-4-7-5/h1-4H,(H,8,9) Key: SIOXPEMLGUPBBT-UHFFFAOYSA-N
- SMILES: c1ccnc(c1)C(=O)O

Properties
Chemical formula	C_{6}H_{5}NO_{2}
Molar mass	123.111 g·mol^{−1}
Appearance	White solid
Density	1.526 g/cm³
Melting point	136 to 138 °C (277 to 280 °F; 409 to 411 K)
Solubility in water	Slightly soluble (0.41%) in water
- Except where otherwise noted, data are given for materials in their standard state (at 25 °C [77 °F], 100 kPa). Infobox references

Picolinic acid is an organic compound with the formula NC_{5}H_{4}CO_{2}H. It is a derivative of pyridine with a carboxylic acid (COOH) substituent at the 2-position. It is an isomer of nicotinic acid and isonicotinic acid, which have the carboxyl side chain at the 3- and 4-positions, respectively. It is a white solid although impure samples can appear tan. The compound is soluble in water.

== Production ==
On a commercial scale, picolinic acid is produced by ammoxidation of 2-picoline followed by hydrolysis of the resulting nitrile:

NC_{5}H_{4}CH_{3} + 1.5 O_{2} + NH_{3} → NC_{5}H_{4}C≡N + 3 H_{2}O
NC_{5}H_{4}C≡N + 2 H_{2}O → NC_{5}H_{4}CO_{2}H + NH_{3}

It is also produced by oxidation of picoline with nitric acid.

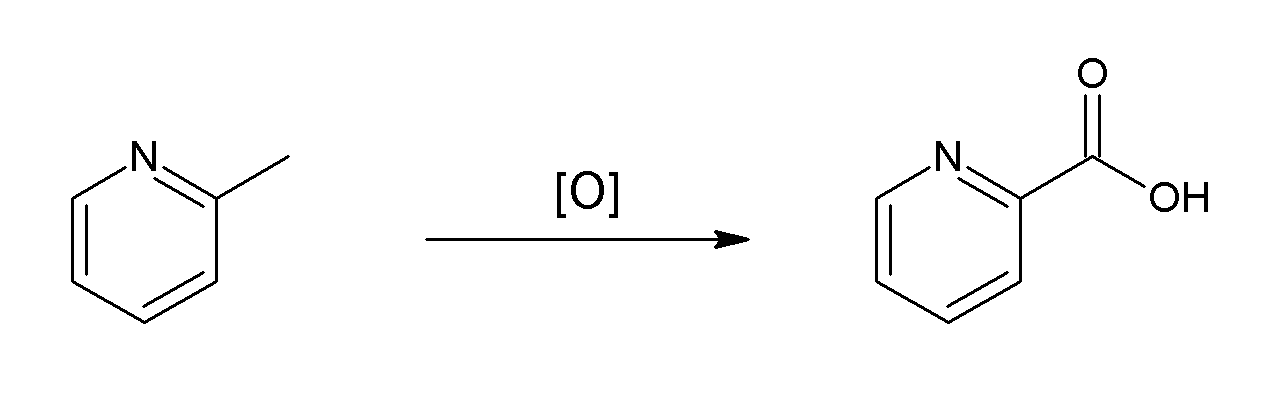

In the laboratory, picolinic acid is formed from 2-methylpyridine by oxidation with potassium permanganate (KMnO_{4}).

== Reactions ==
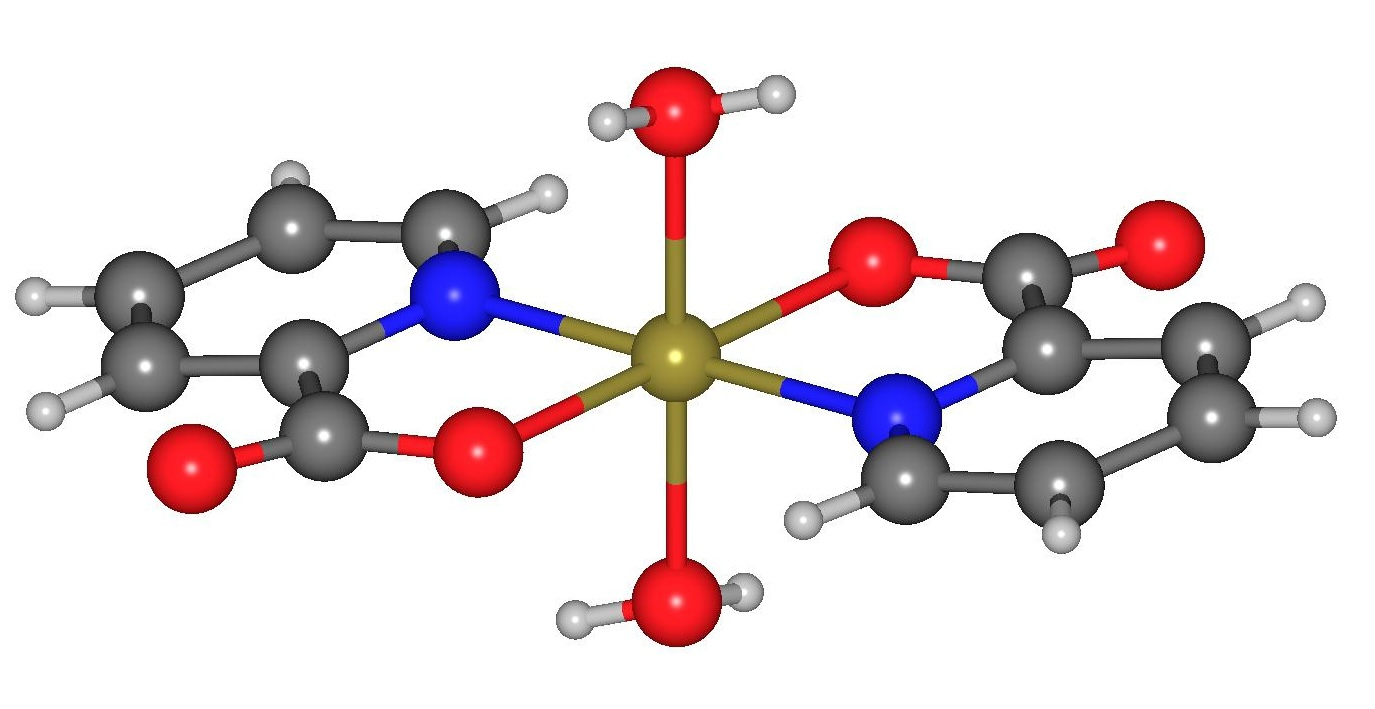
Structure of Zn(picolinate)_{2}(H_{2}O)_{2}.

Hydrogenation of picolinic acid gives piperidine-2-carboxylic acid, a precursor to the drug Mepivacaine.

Picolinic acid is a bidentate chelating agent of elements such as chromium, zinc, manganese, copper, iron, and molybdenum in the human body.

It is a substrate in the Mitsunobu reaction. In the Hammick reaction, picolinic acid reacts with ketones to give pyridine-2-carbonols:

NC_{5}H_{4}CO_{2}H + R_{2}C=O → NC_{5}H_{4}CR_{2}(OH) + CO_{2}

== Biosynthesis ==
Picolinic acid is a catabolite of the amino acid tryptophan through the kynurenine pathway.

The immediate precursor is 2-amino-3-carboxymuconic semialdehyde, which can spontaneously cyclise to quinolinic acid. However, the enzyme aminocarboxymuconate-semialdehyde decarboxylase removes one of its carboxylic acid groups and initially produces 2-aminomuconic semialdehyde.

2-Amino-3-carboxymuconic semialdehyde
CO_{2}
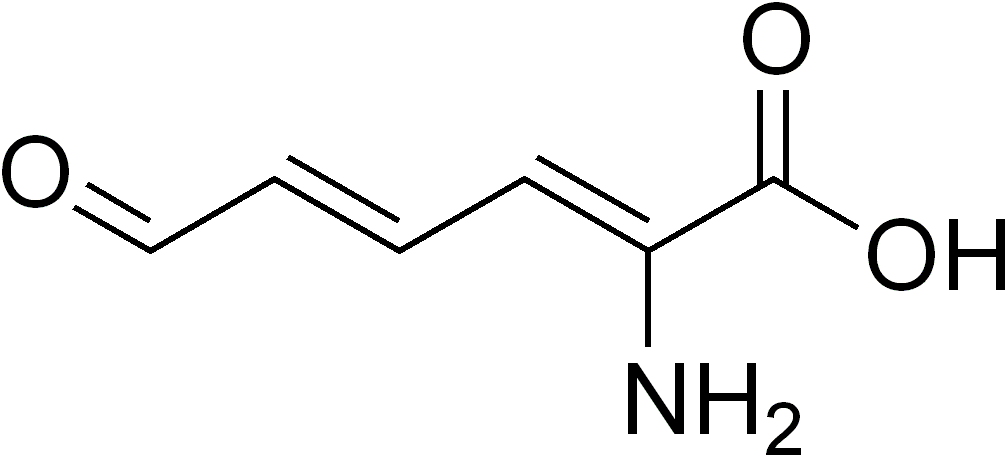
2-Aminomuconic semialdehyde

This intermediate is chemically unstable and ring-closes to picolinic acid, with loss of water.

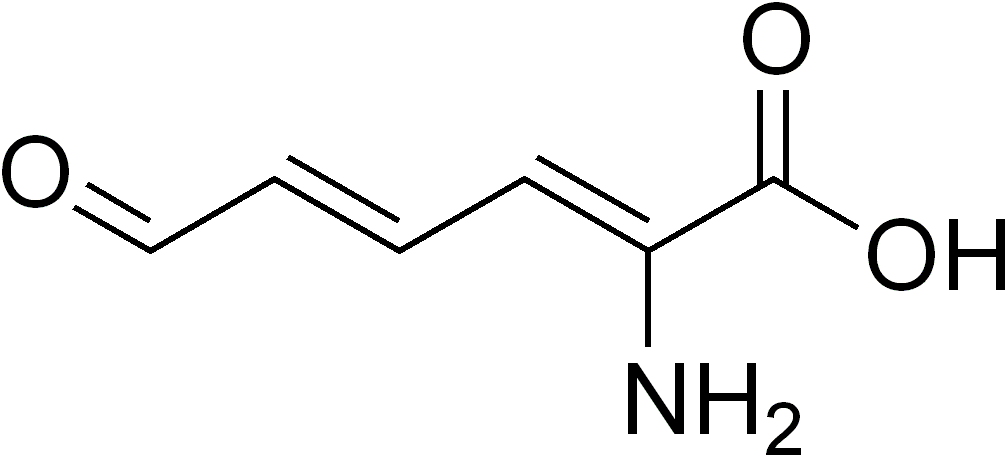
2-Aminomuconic semialdehyde
H_{2}O
Picolinic acid

The function of picolinic acid is unclear, but it has been implicated in a variety of neuroprotective, immunological, and anti-proliferative effects. In addition, it is suggested to assist in the absorption of zinc(II) ions and other divalent or trivalent ions through the small intestine.

== Picolinates ==
Salts of picolinic acid (picolinates) include:

- Chromium(III) picolinate
- Zinc picolinate

== See also ==
- Dipicolinic acid
