= 2-Aminomuconic acid =

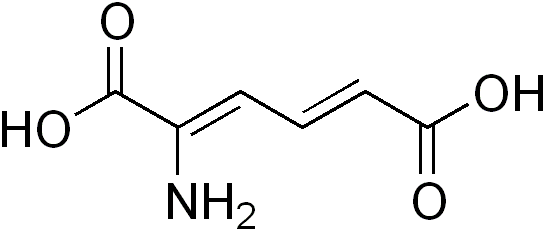
- Skeletal formula of 2-aminomuconic acid

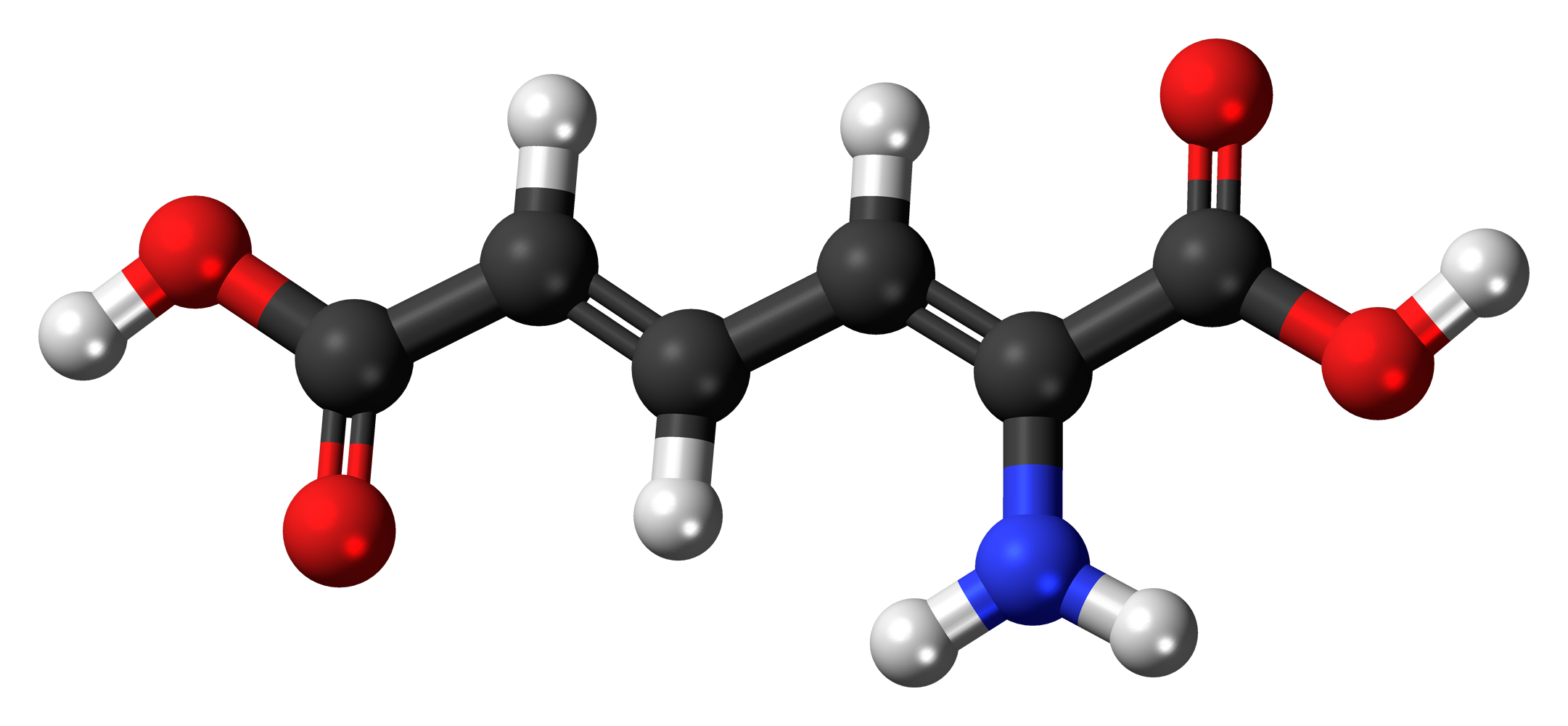
- Ball-and-stick model of 2-aminomuconic acid

Names
- Preferred IUPAC name (2Z,4E)-2-Aminohexa-2,4-dienedioic acid

Identifiers
CAS Number	4548-99-6
3D model (JSmol)	Interactive image
ChEBI	CHEBI:16886
ChemSpider	4573610
KEGG	C02220
PubChem CID	5459864
UNII	9PX3G8GFQ7
CompTox Dashboard (EPA)	DTXSID70274256
- InChI: InChI=1S/C6H7NO4/c7-4(6(10)11)2-1-3-5(8)9/h1-3H,7H2,(H,8,9)(H,10,11)/b3-1+,4-2- Key: ZRHONLCTYUYMIQ-TZFCGSKZSA-N
- SMILES: C(=C\C(=O)O)/C=C(/C(=O)O)\N

Properties
Chemical formula	C6H7NO4
Molar mass	157.12 g/mol
Density	1.461 g/mL
Boiling point	368.4 °C (695.1 °F; 641.5 K)
- Except where otherwise noted, data are given for materials in their standard state (at 25 °C [77 °F], 100 kPa). Infobox references

2-Aminomuconic acid (also known as 2-aminomuconate) is an unsaturated dicarboxylic amino acid. It is an intermediate in the microbial degradation of aromatic compounds containing nitrogen, and also in the kynurenine pathway of tryptophan catabolism.

2-aminomuconic acid has been considered as a biomarker for the evaluation of metabolic dysfunction–associated steatotic liver disease (MASH), with higher levels in the liver correlating with lower disease severity. It has also been used in metabolomic analysis of the response of ovaries to controlled ovarian hyperstimulation.

== See also ==
- Kynurenine pathway
