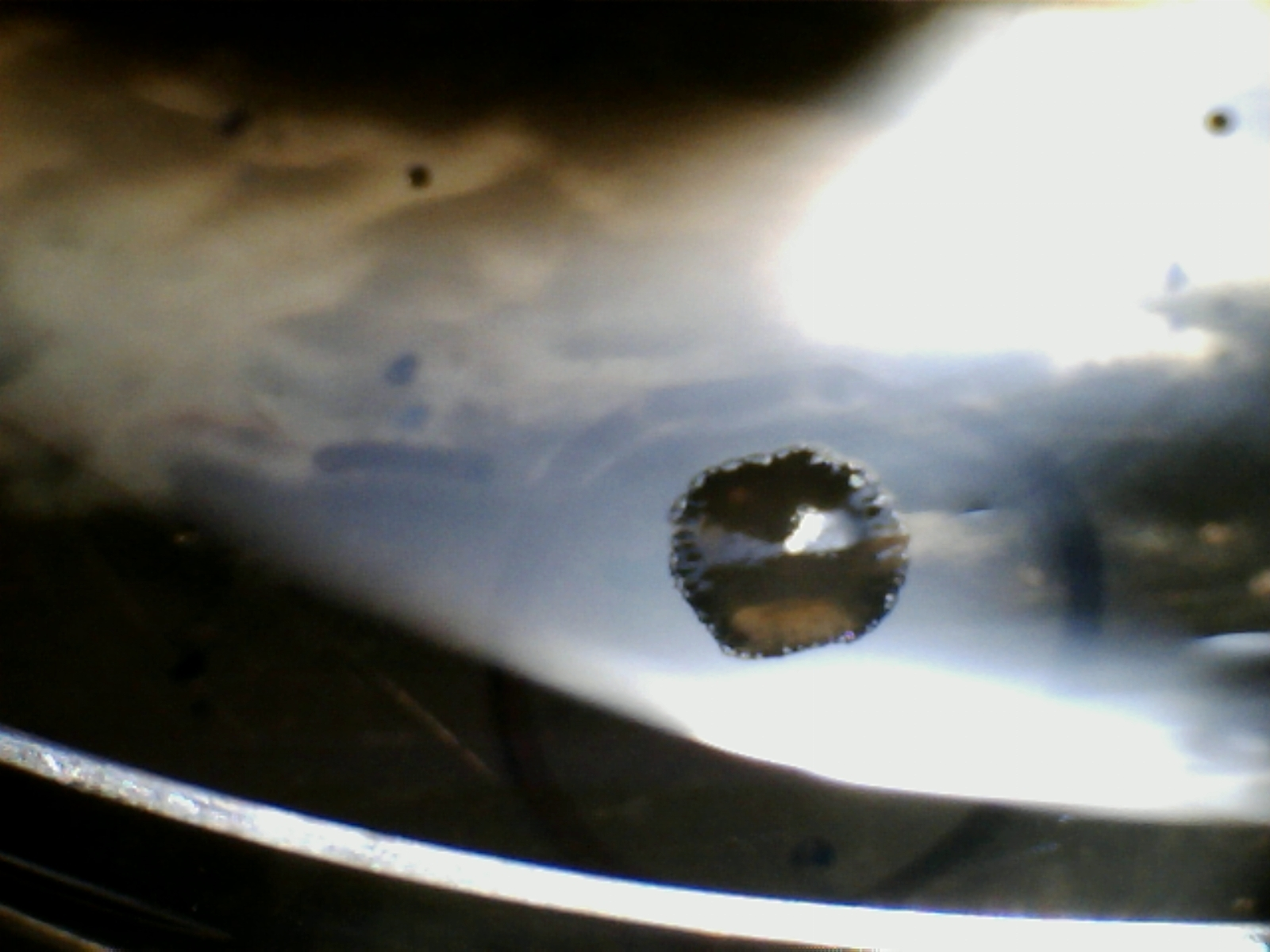
- A colony of Geobacillus thermoglucosidasius

Scientific classification
- Domain: Bacteria
- Kingdom: Bacillati
- Phylum: Bacillota
- Class: Bacilli
- Order: Caryophanales
- Family: Bacillaceae
- Genus: Geobacillus
- Species: G. thermoglucosidasius

Binomial name
- Geobacillus thermoglucosidasius NCBI

= Geobacillus thermoglucosidasius =

Species of bacterium

Geobacillus thermoglucosidasius is a thermophilic gram-positive bacterium, and a member of the Bacillota phylum. It was first isolated from soil in Japan in 1983.

The species name thermoglucosidasius comes from the words therme denoting heat, and glucosidasius denoting starch-hydrolyzing glucosidase activity.

== Biology and biochemistry ==
G. thermoglucosidasius is gram-positive (bacterium that retains Crystal violet dye during gram-staining) and facultatively anaerobic(produces ATP by aerobic respiration if oxygen is present, but capable of switching to fermentation or anaerobic respiration if oxygen is absent). G. thermoglucosidasius is classified as a thermophile as optimal growth occurs at 60 °C (140 °F), although strains have demonstrated ability to grow at temperatures between 37 °C (98.6 °F) and 68 °C (154.4 °F).

Their rod-shaped cells are less than 3.0 micrometers (μm) long and less than 0.9 μm in diameter. Under a microscope, the cells are observed to occur either singly or in short chains, while possessing peritrichous fagella for motility or appearing non-motile.

Vegetative G. thermoglucosidasius sporulates, producing one endospore per cell located terminally or subterminally in slightly swollen or non-swollen sporangia. It can live on a wide variety of substrates. G. thermoglucosidasius uses mixed-acid fermentation in anaerobic conditions, producing lactate, succinate, formate, ethanol, acetate and carbon dioxide. Growth can be driven by aerobic or anaerobic respiration, using a large variety of redox pairs.

== Taxonomy ==
Prior to 1997, G. thermoglucosidasius was categorized into the genus Bacillus in Group 5, a phenotypically and phylogenetically coherent group of thermophilic bacilli displaying very high similarity among their 16S rRNA sequences. However, on the basis of physiological characteristics, fatty acid analysis, DNA hybridization studies and 16S rRNA gene sequence analysis, Nazina et al. proposed the creation of the genus Geobacillus to contain B. thermoglucosidasius, B. stearothermophilus (type species), B. thermoleovorans, B. thermocatenulatus, B. kaustophilus, and B. thermodenitricans. The type strain of G. thermoglucosidasius was subsequently chosen as strain DSM....

== Genome ==
To date, three completed public genome sequences are accessible. ...

== Metabolism ==
Most thermoglucosidasius strains have hydrolytic activity to starch, gelatin, and pullulan, as well as producing acid from adonitol, cellobiose, inositol, and D-xylitol. Colonies are offwhite and mucoid.

== Use in Biotechnology ==
G. thermoglucosidasius is the source of the enzyme BtgZI, a type IIS Restriction enzyme used in Golden Gate Cloning.
