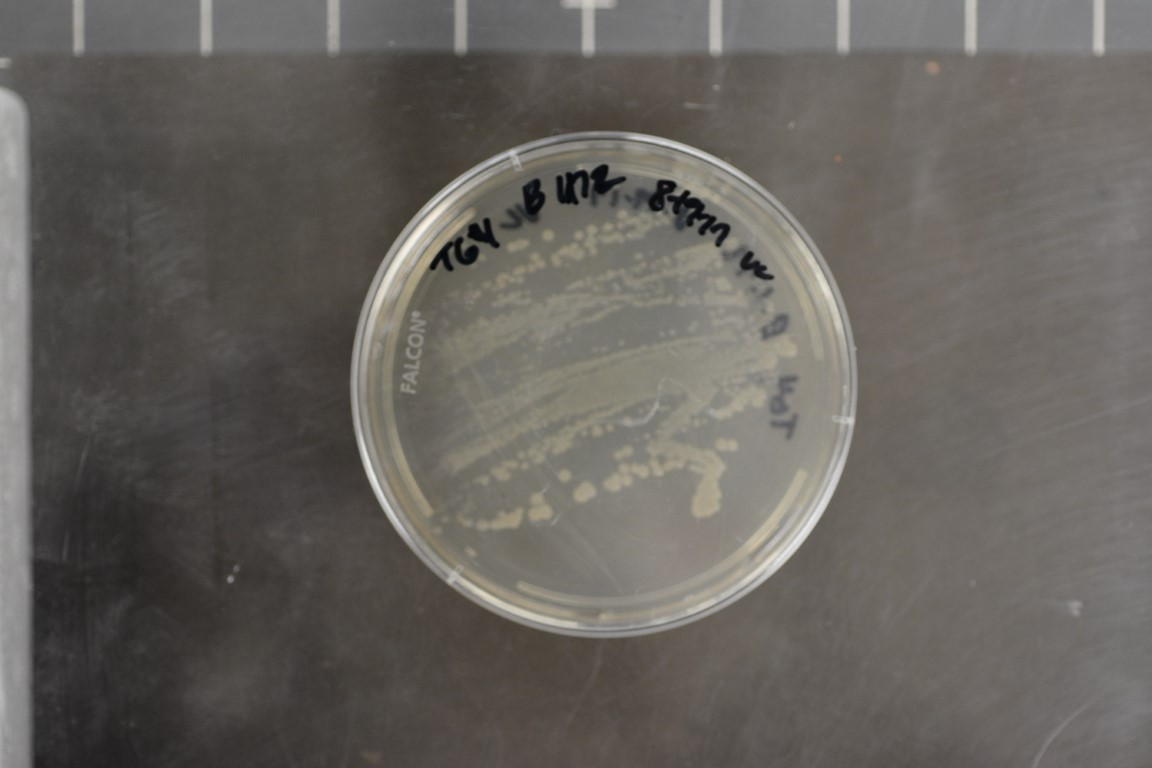
- Geobacillus stearothermophilus on agar plate

Scientific classification
- Domain: Bacteria
- Kingdom: Bacillati
- Phylum: Bacillota
- Class: Bacilli
- Order: Bacillales
- Family: Anoxybacillaceae
- Genus: Geobacillus; Nazina et al. 2001

Type species
- Geobacillus stearothermophilus (Donk 1920) Nazina et al. 2001

Species
- See text

= Geobacillus =

Genus of bacteria

Geobacillus is a bacterial genus from the family Bacillaceae.

== Phylogeny ==
The currently accepted taxonomy is based on the List of Prokaryotic names with Standing in Nomenclature (LPSN) and National Center for Biotechnology Information (NCBI).

16S rRNA based LTP_10_2024

- Geobacillus
  - - G. icigianus Bryanskaya et al. 2015
    - - G. subterraneus Nazina et al. 2001
      - - G. subterraneus aromaticivorans Poli et al. 2013
        - G. thermodenitrificans (Manachini et al. 2000) Nazina et al. 2001
  - - - G. vulcani (Caccamo et al. 2000) Nazina et al. 2004
      - - G. lituanicus Kuisiene, Raugalas & Chitavichius 2004
        - - G. kaustophilus (Priest, Goodfellow & Todd 1989) Nazina et al. 2001
          - G. thermoleovorans (Zarilla & Perry 1988) Nazina et al. 2001
    - - - G. jurassicus Nazina et al. 2005
        - G.uzenensis Nazina et al. 2001
      - - G. proteinophilus Semenova et al. 2019
        - - G. stearothermophilus (Donk 1920) Nazina et al. 2001
          - G. thermocatenulatus (Golovacheva et al. 1991) Nazina et al. 2001

120 marker proteins based GTDB 09-RS220

- Geobacillus
  - - G. subterraneus [incl. G.uzenensis]
    - G. thermodenitrificans
  - - - G. stearothermophilus
      - - G. lituanicus
        - Flavobacterium thermophilum Loginova & Egorova 1982 non Yoshida & Oshima 1971
    - - G. icigianus
      - - G. jurassicus
        - - G. vulcani
          - - G. proteinophilus
            - - G. thermocatenulatus
              - - "G. zalihae" Abd Rahman et al. 2007
                - G. thermoleovorans [incl. G. kaustophilus]

Unassigned species:

- "G. anatolicus" Uysal et al. 2001 ex Caglayan & Bilgin 2011
- "G. bogazici" Turker et al. 2003
- "G. kaue" Uysal et al. 2001 ex Caglayan & Bilgin 2011
- "G. mahadia" Mohtar et al. 2016
- "G. thermopakistaniensis" Siddiqui et al. 2014
- "G. thermoparaffinivorans" Wang et al. 2005
- "G. tropicalis" Burgos-Figueroa et al. 2006
- "G. uralicus" Popova et al. 2002
