= Anthranilate 1,2-dioxygenase (deaminating, decarboxylating) =

Class of enzymes

Identifiers
- EC no.: 1.14.12.1
- CAS no.: 9059-17-0

Databases
- IntEnz: IntEnz view
- BRENDA: BRENDA entry
- ExPASy: NiceZyme view
- KEGG: KEGG entry
- MetaCyc: metabolic pathway
- PRIAM: profile
- PDB structures: RCSB PDB PDBe PDBsum
- Gene Ontology: AmiGO / QuickGO
Search
- PMC: articles
- PubMed: articles
- NCBI: proteins

Anthranilate 1,2-dioxygenase (deaminating, decarboxylating) (EC 1.14.12.1) is an enzyme that catalyzes the chemical reaction

anthranilic acid
+ NADH + H^{+}
O_{2}
CO_{2}
catechol
+ NAD^{+} + NH_{3}

The four substrates of this enzyme are anthranilic acid, reduced nicotinamide adenine dinucleotide (NADH), oxygen, and a proton. Its products are catechol, carbon dioxide, oxidised NAD^{+}, and ammonia. The enzyme can also use nicotinamide adenine dinucleotide phosphate as a cofactor.

This enzyme is an oxidoreductase which uses molecular oxygen as oxidant and incorporates its atoms into the product. The systematic name of this enzyme class is anthranilate,NAD(P)H:oxygen oxidoreductase (1,2-hydroxylating, deaminating, decarboxylating). Other names in common use include anthranilate hydroxylase, anthranilic hydroxylase, and anthranilic acid hydroxylase. It participates in three metabolic pathways: benzoate degradation via hydroxylation, carbazole degradation, and nitrogen metabolism. It requires ferrous iron.
