= Anthranilate 3-monooxygenase =

Enzyme

anthranilate 3-monooxygenase

Identifiers
- EC no.: 1.14.16.3
- CAS no.: 37256-79-4

Databases
- BRENDA: enzyme data
- ExPASy: NiceZyme view
- KEGG: enzyme entry
- MetaCyc: metabolic pathway
- Rhea: reactions
- PDB structures: RCSB PDB PDBe PDBsum
- Gene Ontology: AmiGO / QuickGO
Search
- PMC: articles
- PubMed: articles
- NCBI: proteins

In enzymology, an anthranilate 3-monooxygenase (EC 1.14.16.3) is an enzyme that catalyzes the chemical reaction

anthranilate + tetrahydrobiopterin + O_{2} $\rightleftharpoons$ 3-hydroxyanthranilate + dihydrobiopterin + H_{2}O

The 3 substrates of this enzyme are anthranilate, tetrahydrobiopterin, and O_{2}, whereas its 3 products are 3-hydroxyanthranilate, dihydrobiopterin, and H_{2}O.

This enzyme belongs to the family of oxidoreductases, specifically those acting on paired donors, with O2 as oxidant and incorporation or reduction of oxygen. The oxygen incorporated need not be derived from O2 with reduced pteridine as one donor, and incorporation of one ato of oxygen into the other donor. The systematic name of this enzyme class is anthranilate,tetrahydrobiopterin:oxygen oxidoreductase (3-hydroxylating). Other names in common use include anthranilate 3-hydroxylase, anthranilate hydroxylase, anthranilic hydroxylase, and anthranilic acid hydroxylase. This enzyme participates in tryptophan metabolism. It employs one cofactor, iron.
