= 3-Hydroxyanthranilic acid =

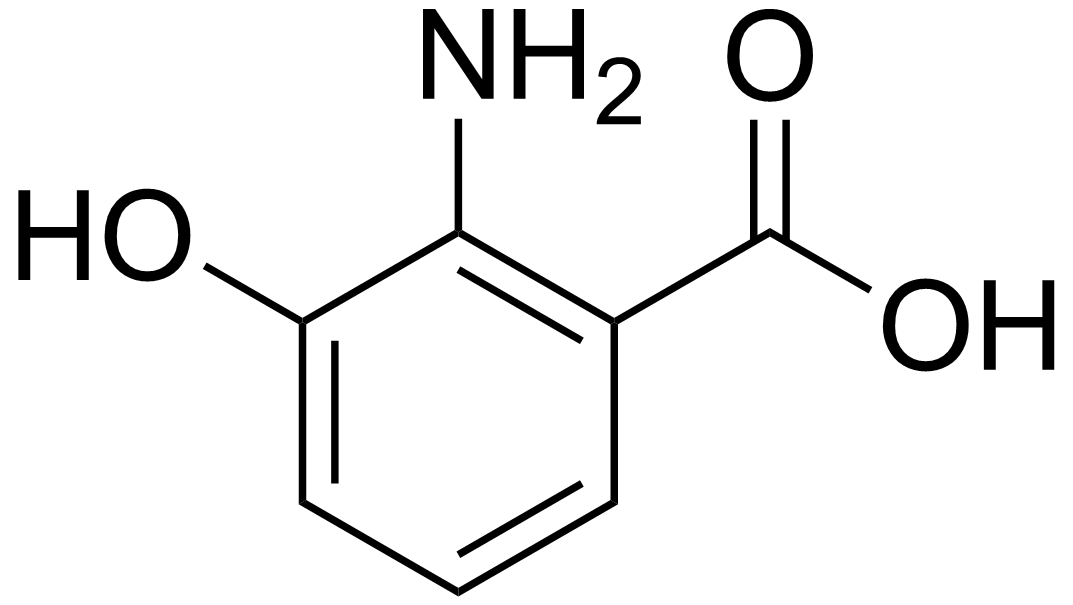

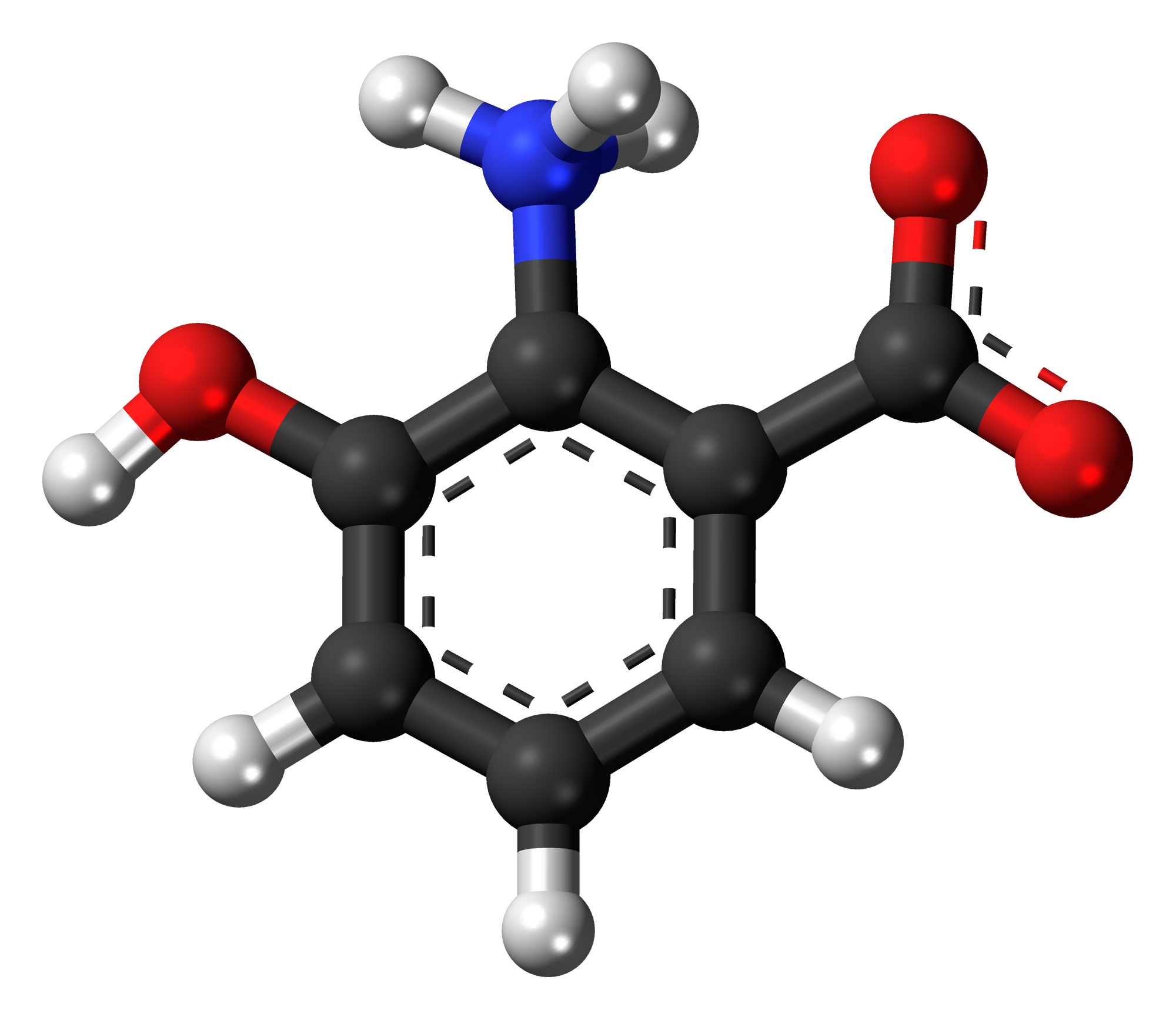

Names
- Preferred IUPAC name 2-Amino-3-hydroxybenzoic acid

Identifiers
CAS Number	548-93-6
3D model (JSmol)	Interactive image; Interactive image
ChEBI	CHEBI:15793
ChEMBL	ChEMBL445304
ChemSpider	84
DrugBank	DB03644
ECHA InfoCard	100.008.148
KEGG	C00632
MeSH	3-Hydroxyanthranilic+Acid
PubChem CID	86
UNII	1UQB1BT4OT
CompTox Dashboard (EPA)	DTXSID40203290
- InChI: InChI=1S/C7H7NO3/c8-6-4(7(10)11)2-1-3-5(6)9/h1-3,9H,8H2,(H,10,11) Key: WJXSWCUQABXPFS-UHFFFAOYSA-N; InChI=1/C7H7NO3/c8-6-4(7(10)11)2-1-3-5(6)9/h1-3,9H,8H2,(H,10,11) Key: WJXSWCUQABXPFS-UHFFFAOYAB
- SMILES: C1=CC(=C(C(=C1)O)N)C(=O)O; c1cc(c(c(c1)O)N)C(=O)O

Properties
Chemical formula	C_{7}H_{7}NO_{3}
Molar mass	153.137 g·mol^{−1}
Appearance	powder
Density	≈ 1 g/cm^{3}
Melting point	240–265 °C (464–509 °F; 513–538 K) decomposes 227 °C (441 °F; 500 K) from dilute HCl, decomposes
Solubility in water	low
Solubility	soluble in ether, CHCl_{3}, alcohols
Solubility in hydrochloric acid	1 N: 1 g/100 ml
Acidity (pK_{a})	at 20 °C: 1 = 2.7, 2 = 5.19, 3 = 10.12
UV-vis (λ_{max})	298 nm
- Except where otherwise noted, data are given for materials in their standard state (at 25 °C [77 °F], 100 kPa). verify (what is ?) Infobox references

3-Hydroxyanthranilic acid is an intermediate in the metabolism of tryptophan. It is new antioxidant isolated from methanol extract of tempeh. It is effective in preventing autoxidation of soybean oil and powder, while antioxidant 6,7,4'-trihydroxyisoflavone is not.
