= List of EC numbers (EC 1) =

This list contains a list of EC numbers for the first group, EC 1, oxidoreductases, placed in numerical order as determined by the Nomenclature Committee of the International Union of Biochemistry and Molecular Biology. All official information is tabulated at the website of the committee. The database is developed and maintained by Andrew McDonald.

== EC 1.1 Acting on the CH-OH group of donors ==
=== EC 1.1.1 With Nicotinamide adenine dinucleotide or NADP as acceptor ===
- EC 1.1.1.1: alcohol dehydrogenase
- EC 1.1.1.2: alcohol dehydrogenase (NADP^{+})
- EC 1.1.1.3: homoserine dehydrogenase
- EC 1.1.1.4: (R,R)-butanediol dehydrogenase
- EC 1.1.1.5: acetoin dehydrogenase. Now EC 1.1.1.303, diacetyl reductase [(R)-acetoin forming] and EC 1.1.1.304, diacetyl reductase [(S)-acetoin forming]
- EC 1.1.1.6: glycerol dehydrogenase
- EC 1.1.1.7: propanediol-phosphate dehydrogenase
- EC 1.1.1.8: glycerol-3-phosphate dehydrogenase (NAD^{+})
- EC 1.1.1.9: D-xylulose reductase
- EC 1.1.1.10: L-xylulose reductase
- EC 1.1.1.11: D-arabinitol 4-dehydrogenase
- EC 1.1.1.12: L-arabinitol 4-dehydrogenase
- EC 1.1.1.13: L-arabinitol 2-dehydrogenase
- EC 1.1.1.14: L-iditol 2-dehydrogenase
- EC 1.1.1.15: D-iditol 2-dehydrogenase
- EC 1.1.1.16: galactitol 2-dehydrogenase
- EC 1.1.1.17: mannitol-1-phosphate 5-dehydrogenase
- EC 1.1.1.18: inositol 2-dehydrogenase
- EC 1.1.1.19: glucuronate reductase
- EC 1.1.1.20: glucuronolactone reductase
- EC 1.1.1.207: (-)-menthol dehydrogenase
- EC 1.1.1.208: (+)-neomenthol dehydrogenase
- EC 1.1.1.21: aldose reductase
- EC 1.1.1.22: UDP-glucose 6-dehydrogenase
- EC 1.1.1.222: (R)-4-hydroxyphenyllactate dehydrogenase
- EC 1.1.1.23: histidinol dehydrogenase|
- EC 1.1.1.24: quinate/shikimate dehydrogenase (NAD^{+})
- EC 1.1.1.25: shikimate dehydrogenase (NADP^{+})
- EC 1.1.1.26: glyoxylate reductase
- EC 1.1.1.27: L-lactate dehydrogenase
- EC 1.1.1.28: D-lactate dehydrogenase
- EC 1.1.1.29: glycerate dehydrogenase
- EC 1.1.1.30: 3-hydroxybutyrate dehydrogenase
- EC 1.1.1.31: 3-hydroxyisobutyrate dehydrogenase
- EC 1.1.1.32: mevaldate reductase
- EC 1.1.1.33: mevaldate reductase (NADPH)
- EC 1.1.1.34: hydroxymethylglutaryl-CoA reductase (NADPH)
- EC 1.1.1.35: 3-hydroxyacyl-CoA dehydrogenase
- EC 1.1.1.36: acetoacetyl-CoA reductase
- EC 1.1.1.37: malate dehydrogenase
- EC 1.1.1.38: malate dehydrogenase (oxaloacetate-decarboxylating)
- EC 1.1.1.39: malate dehydrogenase (decarboxylating)
- EC 1.1.1.40: malate dehydrogenase (oxaloacetate-decarboxylating) (NADP^{+})
- EC 1.1.1.41: isocitrate dehydrogenase (NAD^{+})
- EC 1.1.1.42: isocitrate dehydrogenase (NADP^{+})
- EC 1.1.1.43: phosphogluconate 2-dehydrogenase
- EC 1.1.1.44: phosphogluconate dehydrogenase (NADP^{+}-dependent, decarboxylating)
- EC 1.1.1.45: L-gulonate 3-dehydrogenase
- EC 1.1.1.46: L-arabinose 1-dehydrogenase
- EC 1.1.1.47: glucose 1-dehydrogenase [NAD(P)^{+})]
- EC 1.1.1.48: D-galactose 1-dehydrogenase
- EC 1.1.1.49: glucose-6-phosphate dehydrogenase (NADP^{+})
- EC 1.1.1.50: 3α-hydroxysteroid 3-dehydrogenase (Si-specific)
- EC 1.1.1.51: 3(or 17)β-hydroxysteroid dehydrogenase
- EC 1.1.1.52: 3α-hydroxycholanate dehydrogenase (NAD^{+})
- EC 1.1.1.53: 3α(or 20β)-hydroxysteroid dehydrogenase
- EC 1.1.1.54: allyl-alcohol dehydrogenase
- EC 1.1.1.55: lactaldehyde reductase (NADPH)
- EC 1.1.1.56: ribitol 2-dehydrogenase
- EC 1.1.1.57: fructuronate reductase
- EC 1.1.1.58: tagaturonate reductase
- EC 1.1.1.59: 3-hydroxypropionate dehydrogenase
- EC 1.1.1.60: 2-hydroxy-3-oxopropionate reductase
- EC 1.1.1.61: 4-hydroxybutyrate dehydrogenase
- EC 1.1.1.62: 17β-estradiol 17-dehydrogenase
- EC 1.1.1.63: testosterone 17β-dehydrogenase. Now EC 1.1.1.239, 3α(17β)-hydroxysteroid dehydrogenase (NAD^{+})
- EC 1.1.1.64: testosterone 17β-dehydrogenase (NADP^{+})
- EC 1.1.1.65: pyridoxine 4-dehydrogenase
- EC 1.1.1.66: ω-hydroxydecanoate dehydrogenase
- EC 1.1.1.67: mannitol 2-dehydrogenase
- EC 1.1.1.68: 5,10-methylenetetrahydrofolate reductase. Now EC 1.5.1.20, methylenetetrahydrofolate reductase [NAD(P)H]
- EC 1.1.1.69: gluconate 5-dehydrogenase
- EC 1.1.1.70: D-glucuronolactone dehydrogenase. Now included with EC 1.2.1.3 aldehyde dehydrogenase (NAD^{+})
- EC 1.1.1.71: alcohol dehydrogenase [NAD(P)^{+}]
- EC 1.1.1.72: glycerol dehydrogenase (NADP^{+})
- EC 1.1.1.73: octanol dehydrogenase
- EC 1.1.1.74: D-aminopropanol dehydrogenase (reaction due to EC 1.1.1.4 (R,R)-butanediol dehydrogenase)
- EC 1.1.1.75: (R)-aminopropanol dehydrogenase
- EC 1.1.1.76: (S,S)-butanediol dehydrogenase
- EC 1.1.1.77: lactaldehyde reductase
- EC 1.1.1.78: methylglyoxal reductase (NADH-dependent)
- EC 1.1.1.79: glyoxylate reductase (NADP^{+})
- EC 1.1.1.80: isopropanol dehydrogenase (NADP^{+})
- EC 1.1.1.81: hydroxypyruvate reductase
- EC 1.1.1.82: malate dehydrogenase (NADP^{+})
- EC 1.1.1.83: D-malate dehydrogenase (decarboxylating)
- EC 1.1.1.84: dimethylmalate dehydrogenase
- EC 1.1.1.85: 3-isopropylmalate dehydrogenase
- EC 1.1.1.86: ketol-acid reductoisomerase (NADP^{+})
- EC 1.1.1.87: homoisocitrate dehydrogenase
- EC 1.1.1.88: hydroxymethylglutaryl-CoA reductase
- EC 1.1.1.89: dihydroxyisovalerate dehydrogenase (isomerizing). Now included with EC 1.1.1.86 ketol-acid reductoisomerase
- EC 1.1.1.90: aryl-alcohol dehydrogenase
- EC 1.1.1.91: aryl-alcohol dehydrogenase (NADP^{+})
- EC 1.1.1.92: oxaloglycolate reductase (decarboxylating)
- EC 1.1.1.93: tartrate dehydrogenase
- EC 1.1.1.94: glycerol-3-phosphate dehydrogenase [NAD(P)^{+}]
- EC 1.1.1.95: phosphoglycerate dehydrogenase
- EC 1.1.1.96: diiodophenylpyruvate reductase
- EC 1.1.1.97: 3-hydroxybenzyl-alcohol dehydrogenase
- EC 1.1.1.98: (R)-2-hydroxy-fatty-acid dehydrogenase
- EC 1.1.1.99: (S)-2-hydroxy-fatty-acid dehydrogenase
- EC 1.1.1.100: 3-oxoacyl-[acyl-carrier-protein] reductase
- EC 1.1.1.101: acylglycerone-phosphate reductase
- EC 1.1.1.102: 3-dehydrosphinganine reductase
- EC 1.1.1.103: L-threonine 3-dehydrogenase
- EC 1.1.1.104: 4-oxoproline reductase
- EC 1.1.1.105: all-trans-retinol dehydrogenase (NAD^{+})
- EC 1.1.1.106: pantoate 4-dehydrogenase
- EC 1.1.1.107: pyridoxal 4-dehydrogenase
- EC 1.1.1.108: carnitine 3-dehydrogenase
- EC 1.1.1.109: Now EC 1.3.1.28, 2,3-dihydro-2,3-dihydroxybenzoate dehydrogenase
- EC 1.1.1.110: aromatic 2-oxoacid reductase
- EC 1.1.1.111: 3-(imidazol-5-yl)lactate dehydrogenase
- EC 1.1.1.112: indanol dehydrogenase
- EC 1.1.1.113: L-xylose 1-dehydrogenase
- EC 1.1.1.114: apiose 1-reductase
- EC 1.1.1.115: ribose 1-dehydrogenase (NADP^{+})
- EC 1.1.1.116: D-arabinose 1-dehydrogenase (NAD^{+})
- EC 1.1.1.117: D-arabinose 1-dehydrogenase [NAD(P)^{+}]
- EC 1.1.1.118: glucose 1-dehydrogenase (NAD^{+})
- EC 1.1.1.119: glucose 1-dehydrogenase (NADP^{+})
- EC 1.1.1.120: galactose 1-dehydrogenase (NADP^{+})
- EC 1.1.1.121: aldose 1-dehydrogenase (NAD^{+})
- EC 1.1.1.122: D-threo-aldose 1-dehydrogenase
- EC 1.1.1.123: sorbose 5-dehydrogenase (NADP^{+})
- EC 1.1.1.124: fructose 5-dehydrogenase (NADP^{+})
- EC 1.1.1.125: 2-deoxy-D-gluconate 3-dehydrogenase
- EC 1.1.1.126: 2-dehydro-3-deoxy-D-gluconate 6-dehydrogenase
- EC 1.1.1.127: 2-dehydro-3-deoxy-D-gluconate 5-dehydrogenase
- EC 1.1.1.128: The reaction described is covered by EC 1.1.1.264, L-idonate 5-dehydrogenase.
- EC 1.1.1.129: L-threonate 3-dehydrogenase
- EC 1.1.1.130: 3-dehydro-L-gulonate 2-dehydrogenase
- EC 1.1.1.131: mannuronate reductase
- EC 1.1.1.132: GDP-mannose 6-dehydrogenase
- EC 1.1.1.133: dTDP-4-dehydrorhamnose reductase
- EC 1.1.1.134: dTDP-6-deoxy-L-talose 4-dehydrogenase (NADP^{+})
- EC 1.1.1.135: GDP-6-deoxy-D-talose 4-dehydrogenase
- EC 1.1.1.136: UDP-N-acetylglucosamine 6-dehydrogenase
- EC 1.1.1.137: ribitol-5-phosphate 2-dehydrogenase
- EC 1.1.1.138: mannitol 2-dehydrogenase (NADP^{+})
- EC 1.1.1.139: polyol dehydrogenase (NADP^{+}). Now included with EC 1.1.1.21 aldehyde reductase
- EC 1.1.1.140: sorbitol-6-phosphate 2-dehydrogenase
- EC 1.1.1.141: 15-hydroxyprostaglandin dehydrogenase (NAD^{+})
- EC 1.1.1.142: D-pinitol dehydrogenase
- EC 1.1.1.143: sequoyitol dehydrogenase
- EC 1.1.1.144: perillyl-alcohol dehydrogenase
- EC 1.1.1.145: 3β-hydroxy-Δ5-steroid dehydrogenase
- EC 1.1.1.146: 11β-hydroxysteroid dehydrogenase
- EC 1.1.1.147: 16α-hydroxysteroid dehydrogenase
- EC 1.1.1.148: estradiol 17α-dehydrogenase
- EC 1.1.1.149: 20α-hydroxysteroid dehydrogenase
- EC 1.1.1.150: 21-hydroxysteroid dehydrogenase (NAD^{+})
- EC 1.1.1.151: 21-hydroxysteroid dehydrogenase (NADP^{+})
- EC 1.1.1.152: 3α-hydroxy-5β-androstane-17-one 3α-dehydrogenase
- EC 1.1.1.153: sepiapterin reductase (L-erythro-7,8-dihydrobiopterin forming)
- EC 1.1.1.154: ureidoglycolate dehydrogenase
- EC 1.1.1.155: homoisocitrate dehydrogenase. The enzyme is identical to EC 1.1.1.87, homoisocitrate dehydrogenase
- EC 1.1.1.156: glycerol 2-dehydrogenase (NADP^{+})
- EC 1.1.1.157: 3-hydroxybutyryl-CoA dehydrogenase
- EC 1.1.1.158: Now EC 1.3.1.98, UDP-N-acetylmuramate dehydrogenase
- EC 1.1.1.159: 7α-hydroxysteroid dehydrogenase
- EC 1.1.1.160: dihydrobunolol dehydrogenase
- EC 1.1.1.161: The activity is part of EC 1.14.13.15, cholestanetriol 26-monooxygenase
- EC 1.1.1.162: erythrulose reductase
- EC 1.1.1.163: cyclopentanol dehydrogenase
- EC 1.1.1.164: hexadecanol dehydrogenase
- EC 1.1.1.165: 2-alkyn-1-ol dehydrogenase
- EC 1.1.1.166: hydroxycyclohexanecarboxylate dehydrogenase
- EC 1.1.1.167: hydroxymalonate dehydrogenase
- EC 1.1.1.168: 2-dehydropantolactone reductase (Re-specific)
- EC 1.1.1.169: 2-dehydropantoate 2-reductase
- EC 1.1.1.170: 3β-hydroxysteroid-4α-carboxylate 3-dehydrogenase (decarboxylating)
- EC 1.1.1.171: Now EC 1.5.1.20, methylenetetrahydrofolate reductase [NAD(P)H]
- EC 1.1.1.172: 2-oxoadipate reductase
- EC 1.1.1.173: L-rhamnose 1-dehydrogenase
- EC 1.1.1.174: cyclohexane-1,2-diol dehydrogenase
- EC 1.1.1.175: D-xylose 1-dehydrogenase
- EC 1.1.1.176: 12α-hydroxysteroid dehydrogenase
- EC 1.1.1.177: glycerol-3-phosphate 1-dehydrogenase (NADP^{+})
- EC 1.1.1.178: 3-hydroxy-2-methylbutyryl-CoA dehydrogenase
- EC 1.1.1.179: D-xylose 1-dehydrogenase (NADP^{+}, D-xylono-1,5-lactone-forming)
- EC 1.1.1.180: Now included with EC 1.1.1.131 mannuronate reductase
- EC 1.1.1.181: cholest-5-ene-3β,7α-diol 3β-dehydrogenase
- EC 1.1.1.182: Now included with EC 1.1.1.198 (+)-borneol dehydrogenase, EC 1.1.1.227 (-)-borneol dehydrogenase and EC 1.1.1.228 (+)-sabinol dehydrogenase
- EC 1.1.1.183: geraniol dehydrogenase (NADP^{+})
- EC 1.1.1.184: carbonyl reductase (NADPH)
- EC 1.1.1.185: L-glycol dehydrogenase
- EC 1.1.1.186: dTDP-galactose 6-dehydrogenase
- EC 1.1.1.187: GDP-4-dehydro-D-rhamnose reductase
- EC 1.1.1.188: prostaglandin-F synthase
- EC 1.1.1.189: prostaglandin-E2 9-reductase
- EC 1.1.1.190: indole-3-acetaldehyde reductase (NADH)
- EC 1.1.1.191: indole-3-acetaldehyde reductase (NADPH)
- EC 1.1.1.192: long-chain-alcohol dehydrogenase
- EC 1.1.1.193: 5-amino-6-(5-phosphoribosylamino)uracil reductase
- EC 1.1.1.194: coniferyl-alcohol dehydrogenase
- EC 1.1.1.195: cinnamyl-alcohol dehydrogenase
- EC 1.1.1.196: 15-hydroxyprostaglandin-D dehydrogenase (NADP^{+})
- EC 1.1.1.197: 15-hydroxyprostaglandin dehydrogenase (NADP^{+})
- EC 1.1.1.198: (+)-borneol dehydrogenase
- EC 1.1.1.199: (S)-usnate reductase
- EC 1.1.1.200: aldose-6-phosphate reductase (NADPH)
- EC 1.1.1.228: (+)-sabinol dehydrogenase
- EC 1.1.1.251: galactitol-1-phosphate 5-dehydrogenase
- EC 1.1.1.252: tetrahydroxynaphthalene reductase
- EC 1.1.1.253: Now EC 1.5.1.33, pteridine reductase
- EC 1.1.1.254: (S)-carnitine 3-dehydrogenase
- EC 1.1.1.255: mannitol dehydrogenase
- EC 1.1.1.256: fluoren-9-ol dehydrogenase
- EC 1.1.1.257: 4-(hydroxymethyl)benzenesulfonate dehydrogenase
- EC 1.1.1.258: 6-hydroxyhexanoate dehydrogenase
- EC 1.1.1.259: 3-hydroxypimeloyl-CoA dehydrogenase
- EC 1.1.1.260: sulcatone reductase
- EC 1.1.1.261: sn-glycerol-1-phosphate dehydrogenase
- EC 1.1.1.262: 4-hydroxythreonine-4-phosphate dehydrogenase
- EC 1.1.1.263: 1,5-anhydro-D-fructose reductase
- EC 1.1.1.264: L-idonate 5-dehydrogenase
- EC 1.1.1.265: 3-methylbutanal reductase
- EC 1.1.1.266: dTDP-4-dehydro-6-deoxyglucose reductase
- EC 1.1.1.267: 1-deoxy-D-xylulose-5-phosphate reductoisomerase
- EC 1.1.1.268: 2-(R)-hydroxypropyl-CoM dehydrogenase
- EC 1.1.1.269: 2-(S)-hydroxypropyl-CoM dehydrogenase
- EC 1.1.1.270: 3β-hydroxysteroid 3-dehydrogenase
- EC 1.1.1.271: GDP-L-fucose synthase
- EC 1.1.1.272: D-2-hydroxyacid dehydrogenase (NADP^{+})
- EC 1.1.1.273: vellosimine dehydrogenase
- EC 1.1.1.274: 2,5-didehydrogluconate reductase (2-dehydro-D-gluconate-forming)
- EC 1.1.1.275: (+)-trans-carveol dehydrogenase
- EC 1.1.1.276: serine 3-dehydrogenase (NADP^{+)}
- EC 1.1.1.277: 3β-hydroxy-5β-steroid dehydrogenase
- EC 1.1.1.278: 3β-hydroxy-5α-steroid dehydrogenase
- EC 1.1.1.279: (R)-3-hydroxyacid-ester dehydrogenase
- EC 1.1.1.280: (S)-3-hydroxyacid-ester dehydrogenase
- EC 1.1.1.281: GDP-4-dehydro-6-deoxy-D-mannose reductase
- EC 1.1.1.282: Quinate/shikimate dehydrogenase
- EC 1.1.1.283: methylglyoxal reductase (NADPH-dependent)
- EC 1.1.1.284: S-(hydroxymethyl)glutathione dehydrogenase
- EC 1.1.1.285: 3′′-deamino-3′′-oxonicotianamine reductase
- EC 1.1.1.286: isocitrate—homoisocitrate dehydrogenase
- EC 1.1.1.287: D-arabinitol dehydrogenase (NADP^{+})
- EC 1.1.1.288: xanthoxin dehydrogenase
- EC 1.1.1.289: sorbose reductase
- EC 1.1.1.290: 4-phosphoerythronate dehydrogenase
- EC 1.1.1.291: 2-hydroxymethylglutarate dehydrogenase
- EC 1.1.1.292: 1,5-anhydro-D-fructose reductase (1,5-anhydro-D-mannitol-forming)
- EC 1.1.1.293: tropinone reductase I. This enzyme was already in the Enzyme List as EC 1.1.1.206, tropine dehydrogenase so EC 1.1.1.293 has been withdrawn at the public-review stage
- EC 1.1.1.294: chlorophyll(ide) b reductase
- EC 1.1.1.295: momilactone-A synthase
- EC 1.1.1.296: dihydrocarveol dehydrogenase
- EC 1.1.1.297: limonene-1,2-diol dehydrogenase
- EC 1.1.1.298: 3-hydroxypropionate dehydrogenase (NADP^{+})
- EC 1.1.1.299: malate dehydrogenase [NAD(P)^{+)}]
- EC 1.1.1.300: NADP-retinol dehydrogenase
- EC 1.1.1.301: D-arabitol-phosphate dehydrogenase
- EC 1.1.1.302: 2,5-diamino-6-(ribosylamino)-4(3H)-pyrimidinone 5′-phosphate reductase
- EC 1.1.1.303: Diacetyl reductase ((R)-acetoin forming)
- EC 1.1.1.304: Diacetyl reductase ((S)-acetoin forming)
- EC 1.1.1.305: UDP-glucuronic acid dehydrogenase (UDP-4-keto-hexauronic acid decarboxylating)
- EC 1.1.1.306: S-(hydroxymethyl)mycothiol dehydrogenase
- EC 1.1.1.307: D-xylose reductase
- EC 1.1.1.308: sulfopropanediol 3-dehydrogenase
- EC 1.1.1.309: phosphonoacetaldehyde reductase (NADH)
- EC 1.1.1.310: (S)-sulfolactate dehydrogenase
- EC 1.1.1.311: (S)-1-phenylethanol dehydrogenase
- EC 1.1.1.312: 2-hydroxy-4-carboxymuconate semialdehyde hemiacetal dehydrogenase
- EC 1.1.1.313: sulfoacetaldehyde reductase
- EC 1.1.1.314: Now known to be catalyzed by EC 1.14.14.95, germacrene A hydroxylase
- EC 1.1.1.315: 11-cis-retinol dehydrogenase
- EC 1.1.1.316: L-galactose 1-dehydrogenase
- EC 1.1.1.317: perakine reductase
- EC 1.1.1.318: eugenol synthase
- EC 1.1.1.319: isoeugenol synthase
- EC 1.1.1.320: benzil reductase [(S)-benzoin forming]
- EC 1.1.1.321: benzil reductase [(R)-benzoin forming]
- EC 1.1.1.322: (–)-endo-fenchol dehydrogenase
- EC 1.1.1.323: (+)-thujan-3-ol dehydrogenase
- EC 1.1.1.324: 8-hydroxygeraniol dehydrogenase
- EC 1.1.1.325: sepiapterin reductase (L-threo-7,8-dihydrobiopterin forming)
- EC 1.1.1.326: zerumbone synthase
- EC 1.1.1.327: 5-exo-hydroxycamphor dehydrogenase
- EC 1.1.1.328: nicotine blue oxidoreductase
- EC 1.1.1.329: 2-deoxy-scyllo-inosamine dehydrogenase
- EC 1.1.1.330: very-long-chain 3-oxoacyl-CoA reductase
- EC 1.1.1.331: secoisolariciresinol dehydrogenase
- EC 1.1.1.332: chanoclavine-I dehydrogenase
- EC 1.1.1.333: decaprenylphospho-β-D-erythro-pentofuranosid-2-ulose 2-reductase
- EC 1.1.1.334: methylecgonone reductase
- EC 1.1.1.335: UDP-N-acetyl-2-amino-2-deoxyglucuronate dehydrogenase
- EC 1.1.1.336: UDP-N-acetyl-D-mannosamine dehydrogenase
- EC 1.1.1.337: L-2-hydroxycarboxylate dehydrogenase (NAD^{+})
- EC 1.1.1.338: (2R)-3-sulfolactate dehydrogenase (NADP^{+})
- EC 1.1.1.339: dTDP-6-deoxy-L-talose 4-dehydrogenase (NAD^{+})
- EC 1.1.1.340: 1-deoxy-11β-hydroxypentalenate dehydrogenase
- EC 1.1.1.341: CDP-abequose synthase
- EC 1.1.1.342: CDP-paratose synthase
- EC 1.1.1.343: phosphogluconate dehydrogenase (NAD^{+}-dependent, decarboxylating)
- EC 1.1.1.344: dTDP-6-deoxy-L-talose 4-dehydrogenase [NAD(P)^{+}]
- EC 1.1.1.345: D-2-hydroxyacid dehydrogenase (NAD^{+})
- EC 1.1.1.346: 2,5-didehydrogluconate reductase (2-dehydro-L-gulonate-forming)
- EC 1.1.1.347: geraniol dehydrogenase (NAD^{+})
- EC 1.1.1.348: (3R)-2′-hydroxyisoflavanone reductase
- EC 1.1.1.349: norsolorinic acid ketoreductase
- EC 1.1.1.350: ureidoglycolate dehydrogenase (NAD^{+})
- EC 1.1.1.351: phosphogluconate dehydrogenase [NAD(P)^{+}-dependent, decarboxylating]
- EC 1.1.1.352: 5′-hydroxyaverantin dehydrogenase
- EC 1.1.1.353: versiconal hemiacetal acetate reductase
- EC 1.1.1.354: farnesol dehydrogenase (NAD^{+})
- EC 1.1.1.355: 2′-dehydrokanamycin reductase
- EC 1.1.1.356: GDP-L-colitose synthase
- EC 1.1.1.357: 3α-hydroxysteroid 3-dehydrogenase
- EC 1.1.1.358: 2-dehydropantolactone reductase
- EC 1.1.1.359: aldose 1-dehydrogenase [NAD(P)^{+}]
- EC 1.1.1.360: glucose/galactose 1-dehydrogenase
- EC 1.1.1.361: glucose-6-phosphate 3-dehydrogenase
- EC 1.1.1.362: aklaviketone reductase
- EC 1.1.1.363: glucose-6-phosphate dehydrogenase [NAD(P)^{+}]
- EC 1.1.1.364: dTDP-4-dehydro-6-deoxy-α-D-gulose 4-ketoreductase
- EC 1.1.1.365: D-galacturonate reductase
- EC 1.1.1.366: L-idonate 5-dehydrogenase (NAD^{+})
- EC 1.1.1.367: UDP-2-acetamido-2,6-β-L-arabino-hexul-4-ose reductase
- EC 1.1.1.368: 6-hydroxycyclohex-1-ene-1-carbonyl-CoA dehydrogenase
- EC 1.1.1.369: D-chiro-inositol 1-dehydrogenase
- EC 1.1.1.370: scyllo-inositol 2-dehydrogenase (NAD^{+})
- EC 1.1.1.371: scyllo-inositol 2-dehydrogenase (NADP^{+})
- EC 1.1.1.372: D/L-glyceraldehyde reductase
- EC 1.1.1.373: sulfolactaldehyde 3-reductase
- EC 1.1.1.374: UDP-N-acetylglucosamine 3-dehydrogenase
- EC 1.1.1.375: L-2-hydroxycarboxylate dehydrogenase [NAD(P)^{+}]
- EC 1.1.1.376: L-arabinose 1-dehydrogenase [NAD(P)^{+}]
- EC 1.1.1.377: L-rhamnose 1-dehydrogenase (NADP^{+})
- EC 1.1.1.378: L-rhamnose 1-dehydrogenase [NAD(P)^{+}]
- EC 1.1.1.379: (R)-mandelate dehydrogenase
- EC 1.1.1.380: L-gulonate 5-dehydrogenase
- EC 1.1.1.381: 3-hydroxy acid dehydrogenase
- EC 1.1.1.382: ketol-acid reductoisomerase (NAD^{+})
- EC 1.1.1.383: ketol-acid reductoisomerase [NAD(P)^{+}]
- EC 1.1.1.384: dTDP-3,4-didehydro-2,6-dideoxy-α-D-glucose 3-reductase
- EC 1.1.1.385: dihydroanticapsin dehydrogenase
- EC 1.1.1.386: ipsdienol dehydrogenase
- EC 1.1.1.387: L-serine 3-dehydrogenase (NAD^{+})
- EC 1.1.1.388: glucose-6-phosphate dehydrogenase (NAD^{+})
- EC 1.1.1.389: 2-dehydro-3-deoxy-L-galactonate 5-dehydrogenase
- EC 1.1.1.390: sulfoquinovose 1-dehydrogenase
- EC 1.1.1.391: 3β-hydroxycholanate 3-dehydrogenase (NAD^{+})
- EC 1.1.1.392: 3α-hydroxycholanate dehydrogenase (NADP^{+})
- EC 1.1.1.393: 3β-hydroxycholanate 3-dehydrogenase (NADP^{+})
- EC 1.1.1.394: aurachin B dehydrogenase
- EC 1.1.1.395: 3α-hydroxy bile acid-CoA-ester 3-dehydrogenase
- EC 1.1.1.396: bacteriochlorophyllide a dehydrogenase
- EC 1.1.1.397: β-methylindole-3-pyruvate reductase
- EC 1.1.1.398: 2-glutathionyl-2-methylbut-3-en-1-ol dehydrogenase
- EC 1.1.1.399: 2-oxoglutarate reductase
- EC 1.1.1.400: 2-methyl-1,2-propanediol dehydrogenase
- EC 1.1.1.401: 2-dehydro-3-deoxy-L-rhamnonate dehydrogenase (NAD^{+})
- EC 1.1.1.402: D-erythritol 1-phosphate dehydrogenase
- EC 1.1.1.403: D-threitol dehydrogenase (NAD^{+})
- EC 1.1.1.404: tetrachlorobenzoquinone reductase
- EC 1.1.1.405: ribitol-5-phosphate 2-dehydrogenase (NADP^{+})
- EC 1.1.1.406: galactitol 2-dehydrogenase (L-tagatose-forming)
- EC 1.1.1.407: D-altritol 5-dehydrogenase
- EC 1.1.1.408: 4-phospho-D-threonate 3-dehydrogenase
- EC 1.1.1.409: 4-phospho-D-erythronate 3-dehydrogenase
- EC 1.1.1.410: D-erythronate 2-dehydrogenase
- EC 1.1.1.411: L-threonate 2-dehydrogenase
- EC 1.1.1.412: 2-alkyl-3-oxoalkanoate reductase
- EC 1.1.1.413: A-factor type γ-butyrolactone 1′-reductase (1S-forming)
- EC 1.1.1.414: L-galactonate 5-dehydrogenase
- EC 1.1.1.415: noscapine synthase
- EC 1.1.1.416: isopyridoxal dehydrogenase (5-pyridoxolactone-forming)
- EC 1.1.1.417: 3β-hydroxysteroid-4β-carboxylate 3-dehydrogenase (decarboxylating)
- EC 1.1.1.418: plant 3β-hydroxysteroid-4α-carboxylate 3-dehydrogenase (decarboxylating)
- EC 1.1.1.419: nepetalactol dehydrogenase
- EC 1.1.1.420: D-apiose dehydrogenase
- EC 1.1.1.421: D-apionate oxidoisomerase
- EC 1.1.1.422: pseudoephedrine dehydrogenase
- EC 1.1.1.423: (1R,2S)-ephedrine 1-dehydrogenase
- EC 1.1.1.424: D-xylose 1-dehydrogenase (NADP^{+}, D-xylono-1,4-lactone-forming)
- EC 1.1.1.425: levoglucosan dehydrogenase
- EC 1.1.1.426: UDP-N-acetyl-α-D-quinovosamine dehydrogenase

=== EC 1.1.2 With a cytochrome as acceptor ===
- EC 1.1.2.1: glycerolphosphate dehydrogenase. As the acceptor is now known, the enzyme has been transferred to EC 1.1.5.3, glycerol-3-phosphate dehydrogenase.
- EC 1.1.2.2: mannitol dehydrogenase (cytochrome)
- EC 1.1.2.3: L-lactate dehydrogenase (cytochrome)
- EC 1.1.2.4: D-lactate dehydrogenase (cytochrome)
- EC 1.1.2.5: D-lactate dehydrogenase (cytochrome c-553)
- EC 1.1.2.6: polyvinyl alcohol dehydrogenase (cytochrome)
- EC 1.1.2.7: methanol dehydrogenase (cytochrome c)
- EC 1.1.2.8: alcohol dehydrogenase (cytochrome c)
- EC 1.1.2.9: 1-butanol dehydrogenase (cytochrome c)
- EC 1.1.2.10: lanthanide-dependent methanol dehydrogenase
- EC 1.1.2.11: glucoside 3-dehydrogenase (cytochrome c)

=== EC 1.1.3 With oxygen as acceptor ===
- EC 1.1.3.1: Now included with EC 1.1.3.15 (S)-2-hydroxy-acid oxidase
- EC 1.1.3.2: L-lactate oxidase
- EC 1.1.3.3: malate oxidase
- EC 1.1.3.4: glucose oxidase
- EC 1.1.3.5: hexose oxidase
- EC 1.1.3.6: cholesterol oxidase
- EC 1.1.3.7: aryl-alcohol oxidase
- EC 1.1.3.8: L-gulonolactone oxidase
- EC 1.1.3.9: galactose oxidase
- EC 1.1.3.10: pyranose oxidase
- EC 1.1.3.11: L-sorbose oxidase
- EC 1.1.3.12: pyridoxine 4-oxidase
- EC 1.1.3.13: alcohol oxidase
- EC 1.1.3.14: catechol oxidase (dimerizing)
- EC 1.1.3.15: (S)-2-hydroxy-acid oxidase
- EC 1.1.3.16: ecdysone oxidase
- EC 1.1.3.17: choline oxidase
- EC 1.1.3.18: Secondary-alcohol oxidase
- EC 1.1.3.19: 4-hydroxymandelate oxidase
- EC 1.1.3.20: long-chain-alcohol oxidase
- EC 1.1.3.21: glycerol-3-phosphate oxidase
- EC 1.1.3.22: Now EC 1.17.3.2, xanthine oxidase. The enzyme was incorrectly classified as acting on a CH-OH group
- EC 1.1.3.23: Thiamine oxidase
- EC 1.1.3.24: L-galactonolactone oxidase
- EC 1.1.3.25: Now included with EC 1.1.99.18, cellobiose dehydrogenase (acceptor)
- EC 1.1.3.26: Now EC 1.21.3.2, columbamine oxidase
- EC 1.1.3.27: hydroxyphytanate oxidase
- EC 1.1.3.28: nucleoside oxidase
- EC 1.1.3.29: N-acylhexosamine oxidase
- EC 1.1.3.30: polyvinyl-alcohol oxidase
- EC 1.1.3.31: deleted, cannot be distinguished from EC 1.1.3.13, alcohol oxidase
- EC 1.1.3.32: Now EC 1.14.21.1, (S)-stylopine synthase
- EC 1.1.3.33: Now EC 1.14.21.2, (S)-cheilanthifoline synthase
- EC 1.1.3.34: Now EC 1.14.21.3, berbamunine synthase
- EC 1.1.3.35: Now EC 1.14.21.4, salutaridine synthase
- EC 1.1.3.36: Now EC 1.14.21.5, (S)-canadine synthase
- EC 1.1.3.37: D-arabinono-1,4-lactone oxidase
- EC 1.1.3.38: vanillyl-alcohol oxidase
- EC 1.1.3.39: nucleoside oxidase (H_{2}O_{2}-forming)
- EC 1.1.3.40: D-mannitol oxidase
- EC 1.1.3.41: xylitol oxidase
- EC 1.1.3.42: prosolanapyrone-II oxidase
- EC 1.1.3.43: paromamine 6′-oxidase
- EC 1.1.3.44: 6′′′-hydroxyneomycin C oxidase
- EC 1.1.3.45: aclacinomycin-N oxidase
- EC 1.1.3.46: 4-hydroxymandelate oxidase
- EC 1.1.3.47: 5-(hydroxymethyl)furfural oxidase
- EC 1.1.3.48: 3-deoxy-α-D-manno-octulosonate 8-oxidase
- EC 1.1.3.49: (R)-mandelonitrile oxidase

=== EC 1.1.4 With a disulfide as acceptor ===
- EC 1.1.4.1: Now EC 1.17.4.4, vitamin-K-epoxide reductase (warfarin-sensitive)
- EC 1.1.4.2: Now EC 1.17.4.5, vitamin-K-epoxide reductase (warfarin-insensitive)

=== EC 1.1.5 With a quinone or similar compound as acceptor ===
- EC 1.1.5.1: deleted, see EC 1.1.99.18 cellobiose dehydrogenase (acceptor)
- EC 1.1.5.2: quinoprotein glucose dehydrogenase
- EC 1.1.5.3: glycerol-3-phosphate dehydrogenase (quinone)
- EC 1.1.5.4: malate dehydrogenase (quinone)
- EC 1.1.5.5: alcohol dehydrogenase (quinone)
- EC 1.1.5.6: formate dehydrogenase-N
- EC 1.1.5.7: cyclic alcohol dehydrogenase (quinone)
- EC 1.1.5.8: quinate dehydrogenase (quinone)

=== EC 1.1.9 With a copper protein as acceptor ===
- EC 1.1.9.1: alcohol dehydrogenase (azurin)

=== EC 1.1.98 With other, known, acceptors ===
- EC 1.1.98.1: Now EC 1.1.9.1, alcohol dehydrogenase (azurin)
- EC 1.1.98.2: glucose-6-phosphate dehydrogenase (coenzyme-F_{420})
- EC 1.1.98.3: decaprenylphospho-β-D-ribofuranose 2-oxidase
- EC 1.1.98.3: decaprenylphospho-β-D-ribofuranose 2-dehydrogenase
- EC 1.1.98.4: F_{420}H_{2}:quinone oxidoreductase
- EC 1.1.98.5: secondary-alcohol dehydrogenase (coenzyme-F_{420})
- EC 1.1.98.6: ribonucleoside-triphosphate reductase (formate)
- EC 1.1.98.7: serine-type anaerobic sulfatase-maturating enzyme

=== EC 1.1.99 With unknown physiological acceptors ===
- EC 1.1.99.1: choline dehydrogenase
- EC 1.1.99.2: L-2-hydroxyglutarate dehydrogenase
- EC 1.1.99.3: gluconate 2-dehydrogenase (acceptor)
- EC 1.1.99.4: dehydrogluconate dehydrogenase
- EC 1.1.99.5: now EC 1.1.5.3, glycerol-3-phosphate dehydrogenase
- EC 1.1.99.6: D-2-hydroxy-acid dehydrogenase
- EC 1.1.99.7: lactate—malate transhydrogenase
- EC 1.1.99.8: Now EC 1.1.2.7, methanol dehydrogenase (cytochrome c) and EC 1.1.2.8, alcohol dehydrogenase (cytochrome c).
- EC 1.1.99.9: pyridoxine 5-dehydrogenase
- EC 1.1.99.10: Now EC 1.1.5.9, glucose 1-dehydrogenase (FAD, quinone)
- EC 1.1.99.11: Now classified as EC 1.1.5.14, fructose 5-dehydrogenase
- EC 1.1.99.12: sorbose dehydrogenase
- EC 1.1.99.13: glucoside 3-dehydrogenase
- EC 1.1.99.14: glycolate dehydrogenase
- EC 1.1.99.15: Now EC 1.5.1.20, methylenetetrahydrofolate reductase [NAD(P)H]
- EC 1.1.99.16: Now EC EC 1.1.5.4, malate dehydrogenase (quinone)
- EC 1.1.99.17: Now EC 1.1.5.2, quinoprotein glucose dehydrogenase
- EC 1.1.99.18: cellobiose dehydrogenase (acceptor)
- EC 1.1.99.19: Now EC 1.17.99.4, uracil/thymine dehydrogenase
- EC 1.1.99.20: alkan-1-ol dehydrogenase (acceptor)
- EC 1.1.99.21: D-sorbitol dehydrogenase (acceptor)
- EC 1.1.99.22: glycerol dehydrogenase (acceptor)
- EC 1.1.99.23: Now EC 1.1.2.6, polyvinyl alcohol dehydrogenase (cytochrome)
- EC 1.1.99.24: hydroxyacid-oxoacid transhydrogenase
- EC 1.1.99.25: Now EC 1.1.5.8, quinate dehydrogenase (quinone),
- EC 1.1.99.26: 3-hydroxycyclohexanone dehydrogenase
- EC 1.1.99.27: (R)-pantolactone dehydrogenase (flavin)
- EC 1.1.99.28: glucose-fructose oxidoreductase
- EC 1.1.99.29: pyranose dehydrogenase (acceptor)
- EC 1.1.99.30: 2-oxoacid reductase
- EC 1.1.99.31: (S)-mandelate dehydrogenase
- EC 1.1.99.32: L-sorbose 1-dehydrogenase
- EC 1.1.99.33: Now EC 1.17.99.7, formate dehydrogenase (acceptor)
- EC 1.1.99.34: now EC 1.1.98.2, glucose-6-phosphate dehydrogenase (coenzyme-F_{420})
- EC 1.1.99.35: soluble quinoprotein glucose dehydrogenase
- EC 1.1.99.36: alcohol dehydrogenase (nicotinoprotein)
- EC 1.1.99.37: methanol dehydrogenase (nicotinoprotein)
- EC 1.1.99.38: 2-deoxy-scyllo-inosamine dehydrogenase (AdoMet-dependent)
- EC 1.1.99.39: D-2-hydroxyglutarate dehydrogenase
- EC 1.1.99.40: (R)-2-hydroxyglutarate—pyruvate transhydrogenase
- EC 1.1.99.41: 3-hydroxy-1,2-didehydro-2,3-dihydrotabersonine reductase
- EC 1.1.99.42: 4-pyridoxic acid dehydrogenase

== EC 1.2 Acting on the aldehyde or oxo group of donors ==
=== EC 1.2.1 With NAD^{+} or NADP^{+} as acceptor ===
- EC 1.2.1.1: deleted, replaced by EC 1.1.1.284, S-(hydroxymethyl)glutathione dehydrogenase and EC 4.4.1.22, S-(hydroxymethyl)glutathione synthase
- EC 1.2.1.2: Now EC 1.17.1.9, formate dehydrogenase
- EC 1.2.1.3: aldehyde dehydrogenase (NAD^{+})
- EC 1.2.1.4: aldehyde dehydrogenase (NADP^{+})
- EC 1.2.1.5: aldehyde dehydrogenase (NAD(P)^{+})
- EC 1.2.1.6: deleted (was benzaldehyde dehydrogenase)
- EC 1.2.1.7: benzaldehyde dehydrogenase (NADP^{+})
- EC 1.2.1.8: betaine-aldehyde dehydrogenase
- EC 1.2.1.9: glyceraldehyde-3-phosphate dehydrogenase (NADP^{+})
- EC 1.2.1.10: acetaldehyde dehydrogenase (acetylating)
- EC 1.2.1.11: aspartate-semialdehyde dehydrogenase
- EC 1.2.1.12: glyceraldehyde-3-phosphate dehydrogenase (phosphorylating)
- EC 1.2.1.13: glyceraldehyde-3-phosphate dehydrogenase (NADP^{+}) (phosphorylating)
- EC 1.2.1.14: Now EC 1.1.1.205, IMP dehydrogenase
- EC 1.2.1.15: malonate-semialdehyde dehydrogenase
- EC 1.2.1.16: succinate-semialdehyde dehydrogenase [NAD(P)^{+}]
- EC 1.2.1.17: glyoxylate dehydrogenase (acylating)
- EC 1.2.1.18: malonate-semialdehyde dehydrogenase (acetylating)
- EC 1.2.1.19: aminobutyraldehyde dehydrogenase
- EC 1.2.1.20: glutarate-semialdehyde dehydrogenase
- EC 1.2.1.21: glycolaldehyde dehydrogenase
- EC 1.2.1.22: lactaldehyde dehydrogenase
- EC 1.2.1.23: 2-oxoaldehyde dehydrogenase (NAD^{+})
- EC 1.2.1.24: succinate-semialdehyde dehydrogenase (NAD^{+})
- EC 1.2.1.25: branched-chain α-keto acid dehydrogenase system
- EC 1.2.1.26: 2,5-dioxovalerate dehydrogenase
- EC 1.2.1.27: methylmalonate-semialdehyde dehydrogenase (CoA-acylating)
- EC 1.2.1.28: benzaldehyde dehydrogenase (NAD^{+})
- EC 1.2.1.29: aryl-aldehyde dehydrogenase
- EC 1.2.1.30: aryl-aldehyde dehydrogenase (NADP^{+})
- EC 1.2.1.31: L-aminoadipate-semialdehyde dehydrogenase
- EC 1.2.1.32: aminomuconate-semialdehyde dehydrogenase
- EC 1.2.1.33: (R)-dehydropantoate dehydrogenase
- EC 1.2.1.34: Now EC 1.1.1.131, mannuronate reductase
- EC 1.2.1.35: Now EC 1.1.1.203, uronate dehydrogenase
- EC 1.2.1.36: retinal dehydrogenase
- EC 1.2.1.37: Now EC 1.17.1.4, xanthine dehydrogenase
- EC 1.2.1.38: N-acetyl-γ-glutamyl-phosphate reductase
- EC 1.2.1.39: phenylacetaldehyde dehydrogenase
- EC 1.2.1.40: part of EC 1.14.13.15, cholestanetriol 26-monooxygenase
- EC 1.2.1.41: glutamate-5-semialdehyde dehydrogenase
- EC 1.2.1.42: hexadecanal dehydrogenase (acylating)
- EC 1.2.1.43: Now EC 1.17.1.10, formate dehydrogenase (NADP^{+})
- EC 1.2.1.44: cinnamoyl-CoA reductase
- EC 1.2.1.45: Now EC 1.1.1.312, 2-hydroxy-4-carboxymuconate semialdehyde hemiacetal dehydrogenase
- EC 1.2.1.46: formaldehyde dehydrogenase
- EC 1.2.1.47: 4-trimethylammoniobutyraldehyde dehydrogenase
- EC 1.2.1.48: long-chain-aldehyde dehydrogenase
- EC 1.2.1.49: 2-oxoaldehyde dehydrogenase (NADP^{+})
- EC 1.2.1.50: long-chain-fatty-acyl-CoA reductase
- EC 1.2.1.51: pyruvate dehydrogenase (NADP^{+})
- EC 1.2.1.52: deleted 2025 (was oxoglutarate dehydrogenase (NADP+))
- EC 1.2.1.53: 4-hydroxyphenylacetaldehyde dehydrogenase
- EC 1.2.1.54: γ-guanidinobutyraldehyde dehydrogenase
- EC 1.2.1.55: Now EC 1.1.1.279, (R)-3-hydroxyacid-ester dehydrogenase
- EC 1.2.1.56: Now EC 1.1.1.280, (S)-3-hydroxyacid-ester dehydrogenase
- EC 1.2.1.57: butanal dehydrogenase
- EC 1.2.1.58: phenylglyoxylate dehydrogenase (acylating)
- EC 1.2.1.59: glyceraldehyde-3-phosphate dehydrogenase (NAD(P)^{+})
- EC 1.2.1.60: 5-carboxymethyl-2-hydroxymuconic-semialdehyde dehydrogenase
- EC 1.2.1.61: 4-hydroxymuconic-semialdehyde dehydrogenase
- EC 1.2.1.62: 4-formylbenzenesulfonate dehydrogenase
- EC 1.2.1.63: 6-oxohexanoate dehydrogenase
- EC 1.2.1.64: 4-hydroxybenzaldehyde dehydrogenase (NAD^{+})
- EC 1.2.1.65: salicylaldehyde dehydrogenase
- EC 1.2.1.66: Now EC 1.1.1.306, ''S''-(hydroxymethyl)mycothiol dehydrogenase
- EC 1.2.1.67: vanillin dehydrogenase
- EC 1.2.1.68: coniferyl-aldehyde dehydrogenase
- EC 1.2.1.69: fluoroacetaldehyde dehydrogenase
- EC 1.2.1.70: glutamyl-tRNA reductase
- EC 1.2.1.71: succinylglutamate-semialdehyde dehydrogenase
- EC 1.2.1.72: erythrose-4-phosphate dehydrogenase
- EC 1.2.1.73: sulfoacetaldehyde dehydrogenase
- EC 1.2.1.74: abieta-7,13-dien-18-al dehydrogenase
- EC 1.2.1.75: malonyl CoA reductase (malonate semialdehyde-forming)
- EC 1.2.1.76: succinate-semialdehyde dehydrogenase (acylating)
- EC 1.2.1.77: 3,4-dehydroadipyl-CoA semialdehyde dehydrogenase (NADP^{+})
- EC 1.2.1.78: 2-formylbenzoate dehydrogenase
- EC 1.2.1.79: succinate-semialdehyde dehydrogenase (NADP^{+})
- EC 1.2.1.80: long-chain acyl-[acyl-carrier-protein] reductase
- EC 1.2.1.81: sulfoacetaldehyde dehydrogenase (acylating)
- EC 1.2.1.82: β-apo-4′-carotenal oxygenase
- EC 1.2.1.83: 3-succinoylsemialdehyde-pyridine dehydrogenase
- EC 1.2.1.84: alcohol-forming fatty acyl-CoA reductase
- EC 1.2.1.85: 2-hydroxymuconate-6-semialdehyde dehydrogenase
- EC 1.2.1.86: geranial dehydrogenase
- EC 1.2.1.87: propanal dehydrogenase (CoA-propanoylating)
- EC 1.2.1.88: L-glutamate γ-semialdehyde dehydrogenase
- EC 1.2.1.89: D-glyceraldehyde dehydrogenase (NADP^{+})
- EC 1.2.1.90: glyceraldehyde-3-phosphate dehydrogenase [NAD(P)^{+}]
- EC 1.2.1.91: 3-oxo-5,6-dehydrosuberyl-CoA semialdehyde dehydrogenase
- EC 1.2.1.92: 3,6-anhydro-α-L-galactose dehydrogenase
- EC 1.2.1.93: formate dehydrogenase (NAD+, ferredoxin). Now EC 1.17.1.11, formate dehydrogenase (NAD^{+}, ferredoxin) *
- EC 1.2.1.94: farnesal dehydrogenase
- EC 1.2.1.95: L-2-aminoadipate reductase
- EC 1.2.1.96: 4-hydroxybenzaldehyde dehydrogenase (^{+}+)
- EC 1.2.1.97: 3-sulfolactaldehyde dehydrogenase
- EC 1.2.1.98: 2-hydroxy-2-methylpropanal dehydrogenase
- EC 1.2.1.99: 4-(γ-glutamylamino)butanal dehydrogenase
- EC 1.2.1.100: 5-formyl-3-hydroxy-2-methylpyridine 4-carboxylic acid 5-dehydrogenase
- EC 1.2.1.101: L-tyrosine reductase
- EC 1.2.1.102: isopyridoxal dehydrogenase (5-pyridoxate-forming)
- EC 1.2.1.103: [amino-group carrier protein]-6-phospho-L-2-aminoadipate reductase
- EC 1.2.1.104: pyruvate dehydrogenase system
- EC 1.2.1.105: 2-oxoglutarate dehydrogenase system
- EC 1.2.1.106: [amino-group carrier protein]-5-phospho-L-glutamate reductase
- EC 1.2.1.107: glyceraldehyde-3-phosphate dehydrogenase (arsenate-transferring)

=== EC 1.2.2 With a cytochrome as acceptor ===
- EC 1.2.2.1: formate dehydrogenase (cytochrome)
- EC 1.2.2.2: Now covered by EC 1.2.5.1, pyruvate dehydrogenase (quinone)
- EC 1.2.2.3: Now EC 1.17.2.3, formate dehydrogenase (cytochrome-c-553)
- EC 1.2.2.4: Now classified as EC 1.2.5.3, aerobic carbon monoxide dehydrogenase

=== EC 1.2.3 With oxygen as acceptor ===
- EC 1.2.3.1: aldehyde oxidase
- EC 1.2.3.2: Now EC 1.17.3.2, xanthine oxidase
- EC 1.2.3.3: pyruvate oxidase
- EC 1.2.3.4: oxalate oxidase
- EC 1.2.3.5: glyoxylate oxidase
- EC 1.2.3.6: pyruvate oxidase (CoA-acetylating)
- EC 1.2.3.7: indole-3-acetaldehyde oxidase
- EC 1.2.3.8: pyridoxal oxidase
- EC 1.2.3.9: aryl-aldehyde oxidase
- EC 1.2.3.10: deleted, activity due to EC 1.2.2.4 carbon-monoxide dehydrogenase (cytochrome b-561)
- EC 1.2.3.11: Now included with EC 1.2.3.1, aldehyde oxidase
- EC 1.2.3.12: Now included with EC 1.2.3.1, aldehyde oxidase
- EC 1.2.3.13: Now EC 1.14.13.82, vanillate monooxygenase
- EC 1.2.3.14: Abscisic-aldehyde oxidase
- EC 1.2.3.15: (methyl)glyoxal oxidase

=== EC 1.2.4 With a disulfide as acceptor ===
- EC 1.2.4.1: pyruvate dehydrogenase (acetyl-transferring)
- EC 1.2.4.2: oxoglutarate dehydrogenase (succinyl-transferring)
- EC 1.2.4.3: Now included with EC 1.2.4.4, 3-methyl-2-oxobutanoate dehydrogenase (2-methylpropanoyl-transferring)
- EC 1.2.4.4: 3-methyl-2-oxobutanoate dehydrogenase (2-methylpropanoyl-transferring)

=== EC 1.2.5 With a quinone or similar compound as acceptor ===
- EC 1.2.5.1: pyruvate dehydrogenase (quinone)
- EC 1.2.5.2: aldehyde dehydrogenase (quinone)
- EC 1.2.5.3: aerobic carbon monoxide dehydrogenase

=== EC 1.2.7 With an iron–sulfur protein as acceptor ===
- EC 1.2.7.1: pyruvate synthase
- EC 1.2.7.2: Now included with EC 1.2.7.1, pyruvate synthase.
- EC 1.2.7.3: 2-oxoglutarate synthase
- EC 1.2.7.4: anaerobic carbon monoxide dehydrogenase
- EC 1.2.7.5: aldehyde ferredoxin oxidoreductase
- EC 1.2.7.6: glyceraldehyde-3-phosphate dehydrogenase (ferredoxin)
- EC 1.2.7.7: 3-methyl-2-oxobutanoate dehydrogenase (ferredoxin)
- EC 1.2.7.8: indolepyruvate ferredoxin oxidoreductase
- EC 1.2.7.9: deleted, identical to EC 1.2.7.3, 2-oxoglutarate synthase
- EC 1.2.7.10: oxalate oxidoreductase
- EC 1.2.7.11: 2-oxoacid oxidoreductase (ferredoxin)
- EC 1.2.7.12: formylmethanofuran dehydrogenase

=== EC 1.2.98: With other, known physiological acceptors ===
- EC 1.2.98.1: formaldehyde dismutase

=== EC 1.2.99: With unknown physiological acceptors ===
- EC 1.2.99.1: Now EC 1.17.99.4, uracil/thymine dehydrogenase
- EC 1.2.99.2: Now EC 1.2.7.4, carbon-monoxide dehydrogenase (ferredoxin)
- EC 1.2.99.3: Now EC 1.2.5.2, aldehyde dehydrogenase (quinone)
- EC 1.2.99.4: Now EC 1.2.98.1, formaldehyde dismutase
- EC 1.2.99.5: Now EC 1.2.7.12, formylmethanofuran dehydrogenase
- EC 1.2.99.6: carboxylate reductase
- EC 1.2.99.7: aldehyde dehydrogenase (FAD-independent)
- EC 1.2.99.8: glyceraldehyde dehydrogenase (FAD-containing)
- EC 1.2.99.9: Now EC 1.17.98.3, formate dehydrogenase (coenzyme F_{420})
- EC 1.2.99.10: 4,4′-diapolycopenoate synthase

== EC 1.3 Acting on the CH-CH group of donors ==
=== EC 1.3.1 With NAD^{+} or NADP^{+} as acceptor ===
- EC 1.3.1.1: dihydrouracil dehydrogenase (NAD^{+})
- EC 1.3.1.2: dihydropyrimidine dehydrogenase (NADP^{+})
- EC 1.3.1.3: Δ^{4}-3-oxosteroid 5β-reductase
- EC 1.3.1.4: transferred to EC 1.3.1.22, 3-oxo-5α-steroid 4-dehydrogenase (NADP^{+})
- EC 1.3.1.5: cucurbitacin Δ^{23}-reductase
- EC 1.3.1.6: fumarate reductase (NADH)
- EC 1.3.1.7: meso-tartrate dehydrogenase
- EC 1.3.1.8: acyl-CoA dehydrogenase (NADP^{+})
- EC 1.3.1.9: enoyl-[acyl-carrier-protein] reductase (NADH)
- EC 1.3.1.10: enoyl-[acyl-carrier-protein] reductase (NADPH, Si-specific)
- EC 1.3.1.11: 2-coumarate reductase
- EC 1.3.1.12: prephenate dehydrogenase
- EC 1.3.1.13: prephenate dehydrogenase (NADP^{+})
- EC 1.3.1.14: dihydroorotate dehydrogenase (NAD^{+})
- EC 1.3.1.15: dihydroorotate dehydrogenase (NADP^{+})
- EC 1.3.1.16: β-nitroacrylate reductase
- EC 1.3.1.17: 3-methyleneoxindole reductase
- EC 1.3.1.18: kynurenate-7,8-dihydrodiol dehydrogenase
- EC 1.3.1.19: cis-1,2-dihydrobenzene-1,2-diol dehydrogenase
- EC 1.3.1.20: trans-1,2-dihydrobenzene-1,2-diol dehydrogenase
- EC 1.3.1.21: 7-dehydrocholesterol reductase
- EC 1.3.1.22: 3-oxo-5α-steroid 4-dehydrogenase (NADP^{+})
- EC 1.3.1.23: Identical to EC 1.3.1.3, Δ4-3-oxosteroid 5β-reductase
- EC 1.3.1.24: biliverdin reductase
- EC 1.3.1.25: 1,6-dihydroxycyclohexa-2,4-diene-1-carboxylate dehydrogenase
- EC 1.3.1.26: Now EC 1.17.1.8, 4-hydroxy-tetrahydrodipicolinate reductase
- EC 1.3.1.27: 2-hexadecenal reductase
- EC 1.3.1.28: 2,3-dihydro-2,3-dihydroxybenzoate dehydrogenase
- EC 1.3.1.29: cis-1,2-dihydro-1,2-dihydroxynaphthalene dehydrogenase
- EC 1.3.1.30: transferred to EC 1.3.1.22, 3-oxo-5α-steroid 4-dehydrogenase (NADP^{+})
- EC 1.3.1.31: 2-enoate reductase
- EC 1.3.1.32: maleylacetate reductase
- EC 1.3.1.33: protochlorophyllide reductase
- EC 1.3.1.34: 2,4 Dienoyl-CoA reductase (NADPH)
- EC 1.3.1.35: Now EC 1.14.19.22, microsomal oleoyl-lipid 12-desaturase
- EC 1.3.1.36: geissoschizine dehydrogenase
- EC 1.3.1.37: cis-2-enoyl-CoA reductase (NADPH)
- EC 1.3.1.38: trans-2-enoyl-CoA reductase (NADPH)
- EC 1.3.1.39: trans-2-enoyl-CoA reductase (NADPH)
- EC 1.3.1.40: 2-hydroxy-6-oxo-6-phenylhexa-2,4-dienoate reductase
- EC 1.3.1.41: xanthommatin reductase
- EC 1.3.1.42: 12-oxophytodienoate reductase
- EC 1.3.1.43: arogenate dehydrogenase
- EC 1.3.1.44: trans-2-enoyl-CoA reductase (NAD^{+})
- EC 1.3.1.45: 2′-hydroxyisoflavone reductase
- EC 1.3.1.46: biochanin-A reductase
- EC 1.3.1.47: α-santonin 1,2-reductase
- EC 1.3.1.48: 13,14-dehydro-15-oxoprostaglandin 13-reductase
- EC 1.3.1.49: cis-3,4-dihydrophenanthrene-3,4-diol dehydrogenase
- EC 1.3.1.50: n Now EC 1.1.1.252 tetrahydroxynaphthalene reductase
- EC 1.3.1.51: 2′-hydroxydaidzein reductase
- EC 1.3.1.52: Now EC 1.3.8.5, 2-methyl-branched-chain-enoyl-CoA reductase
- EC 1.3.1.53: (3S,4R)-3,4-dihydroxycyclohexa-1,5-diene-1,4-dicarboxylate dehydrogenase
- EC 1.3.1.54: precorrin-6A reductase
- EC 1.3.1.55: identical to EC 1.3.1.25, 1,6-dihydroxycyclohexa-2,4-diene-1-carboxylate dehydrogenase
- EC 1.3.1.56: cis-2,3-dihydrobiphenyl-2,3-diol dehydrogenase
- EC 1.3.1.57: phloroglucinol reductase
- EC 1.3.1.58: 2,3-dihydroxy-2,3-dihydro-p-cumate dehydrogenase
- EC 1.3.1.59: There is no evidence that the enzyme exists
- EC 1.3.1.60: dibenzothiophene dihydrodiol dehydrogenase
- EC 1.3.1.61: identical to EC 1.3.1.53, (3S,4R)-3,4-dihydroxycyclohexa-1,5-diene-1,4-dicarboxylate dehydrogenase
- EC 1.3.1.62: pimeloyl-CoA dehydrogenase
- EC 1.3.1.63: Now EC 1.21.1.2, 2,4-dichlorobenzoyl-CoA reductase
- EC 1.3.1.64: phthalate 4,5-cis-dihydrodiol dehydrogenase
- EC 1.3.1.65: 5,6-dihydroxy-3-methyl-2-oxo-1,2,5,6-tetrahydroquinoline dehydrogenase
- EC 1.3.1.66: cis-dihydroethylcatechol dehydrogenase
- EC 1.3.1.67: cis-1,2-dihydroxy-4-methylcyclohexa-3,5-diene-1-carboxylate dehydrogenase
- EC 1.3.1.68: 1,2-dihydroxy-6-methylcyclohexa-3,5-dienecarboxylate dehydrogenase
- EC 1.3.1.69: zeatin reductase
- EC 1.3.1.70: Δ^{14}-sterol reductase
- EC 1.3.1.71: Δ^{24(24^{1})}-sterol reductase
- EC 1.3.1.72: Δ^{24}-sterol reductase
- EC 1.3.1.73: 1,2-dihydrovomilenine reductase
- EC 1.3.1.74: 2-alkenal reductase [NAD(P)^{+}]
- EC 1.3.1.75: 3,8-divinyl protochlorophyllide a 8-vinyl-reductase (NADPH)
- EC 1.3.1.76: precorrin-2 dehydrogenase
- EC 1.3.1.77: anthocyanidin reductase [(2R,3R)-flavan-3-ol-forming]
- EC 1.3.1.78: arogenate dehydrogenase (NADP^{+})
- EC 1.3.1.79: arogenate dehydrogenase (NAD(P)^{+})
- EC 1.3.1.80: Now classified as EC 1.3.7.12, red chlorophyll catabolite reductase
- EC 1.3.1.81: (+)-pulegone reductase
- EC 1.3.1.82: (-)-isopiperitenone reductase
- EC 1.3.1.83: geranylgeranyl diphosphate reductase
- EC 1.3.1.84: acrylyl-CoA reductase (NADPH)
- EC 1.3.1.85: crotonyl-CoA carboxylase/reductase
- EC 1.3.1.86: crotonyl-CoA reductase
- EC 1.3.1.87: 3-(cis-5,6-dihydroxycyclohexa-1,3-dien-1-yl)propanoate dehydrogenase
- EC 1.3.1.88: tRNA-dihydrouridine^{16/17} synthase (NAD(P)^{+})
- EC 1.3.1.89: tRNA-dihydrouridine^{47} synthase (NAD(P)^{+})
- EC 1.3.1.90: tRNA-dihydrouridine^{20a/20b} synthase (NAD(P)^{+})
- EC 1.3.1.91: tRNA-dihydrouridine^{20} synthase (NAD(P)^{+})
- EC 1.3.1.92: artemisinic aldehyde Δ^{11(13)}-reductase
- EC 1.3.1.93: very-long-chain enoyl-CoA reductase
- EC 1.3.1.94: polyprenol reductase
- EC 1.3.1.95: acrylyl-CoA reductase (NADH)
- EC 1.3.1.96: Botryococcus squalene synthase
- EC 1.3.1.97: botryococcene synthase
- EC 1.3.1.98: Now known to be catalyzed by two different enzymes, EC 1.3.1.122, (S)-8-oxocitronellyl enol synthase, and EC 5.5.1.34, (+)-cis,trans-nepetalactol synthase
- EC 1.3.1.100: chanoclavine-I aldehyde reductase
- EC 1.3.1.101: 2,3-bis-O-geranylgeranyl-sn-glycerol 1-phosphate reductase [NAD(P)H]
- EC 1.3.1.102: 2-alkenal reductase (NADP+)
- EC 1.3.1.103: 2-haloacrylate reductase
- EC 1.3.1.104: enoyl-[acyl-carrier-protein] reductase (NADPH)
- EC 1.3.1.105: 2-methylene-furan-3-one reductase
- EC 1.3.1.106: cobalt-precorrin-6A reductase
- EC 1.3.1.107: sanguinarine reductase
- EC 1.3.1.108: caffeoyl-CoA reductase
- EC 1.3.1.109: butanoyl-CoA dehydrogenase complex (NAD^{+}, ferredoxin)
- EC 1.3.1.110: lactate dehydrogenase (NAD^{+},ferredoxin)
- EC 1.3.1.111: geranylgeranyl-bacteriochlorophyllide a reductase
- EC 1.3.1.112: anthocyanidin reductase [(2S)-flavan-3-ol-forming]
- EC 1.3.1.113: (4-alkanoyl-5-oxo-2,5-dihydrofuran-3-yl)methyl phosphate reductase
- EC 1.3.1.114: 3-dehydro-bile acid Δ^{4,6}-reductase
- EC 1.3.1.115: 3-oxocholoyl-CoA 4-desaturase
- EC 1.3.1.116: 7β-hydroxy-3-oxochol-24-oyl-CoA 4-desaturase
- EC 1.3.1.117: hydroxycinnamoyl-CoA reductase
- EC 1.3.1.118: meromycolic acid enoyl-[acyl-carrier-protein] reductase
- EC 1.3.1.119: chlorobenzene dihydrodiol dehydrogenase
- EC 1.3.1.120: cyclohexane-1-carbonyl-CoA reductase NADP^{+})
- EC 1.3.1.121: 4-amino-4-deoxyprephenate dehydrogenase
- EC 1.3.1.122: (S)-8-oxocitronellyl enol synthase
- EC 1.3.1.123: 8-oxogeranial reductase
- EC 1.3.1.124: 2,4-dienoyl-CoA reductase [(3E)-enoyl-CoA-producing]

=== EC 1.3.2 With a cytochrome as acceptor ===
- EC 1.3.2.1: now EC 1.3.99.2
- EC 1.3.2.2: now EC 1.3.99.3
- EC 1.3.2.3: galactonolactone dehydrogenase

=== EC 1.3.3 With oxygen as acceptor ===
- EC 1.3.3.1: dihydroorotate oxidase
- EC 1.3.3.2: Now EC 1.14.19.20 Δ^{7}-sterol 5(6)-desaturase
- EC 1.3.3.3: coproporphyrinogen oxidase
- EC 1.3.3.4: protoporphyrinogen oxidase
- EC 1.3.3.5: bilirubin oxidase
- EC 1.3.3.6: acyl-CoA oxidase
- EC 1.3.3.7: dihydrouracil oxidase
- EC 1.3.3.8: tetrahydroberberine oxidase
- EC 1.3.3.9: Now EC 1.14.19.62 secologanin synthase
- EC 1.3.3.10: tryptophan a,b-oxidase
- EC 1.3.3.11: pyrroloquinoline-quinone synthase
- EC 1.3.3.12: l-galactonolactone oxidase

=== EC 1.3.5 With a quinone or related compound as acceptor ===
- EC 1.3.5.1: succinate dehydrogenase (quinone)
- EC 1.3.5.2: dihydroorotate dehydrogenase (quinone)
- EC 1.3.5.3: protoporphyrinogen IX dehydrogenase (menaquinone)
- EC 1.3.5.4: fumarate reductase (quinol)
- EC 1.3.5.5: 15-cis-phytoene desaturase
- EC 1.3.5.6: 9,9'-dicis-zeta-carotene desaturase

=== EC 1.3.7 With an iron–sulfur protein as acceptor ===
- EC 1.3.7.1: 6-hydroxynicotinate reductase
- EC 1.3.7.2: 15,16-dihydrobiliverdin:ferredoxin oxidoreductase
- EC 1.3.7.3: phycoerythrobilin:ferredoxin oxidoreductase
- EC 1.3.7.4: phytochromobilin:ferredoxin oxidoreductase
- EC 1.3.7.5: phycocyanobilin:ferredoxin oxidoreductase
- EC 1.3.7.6: phycoerythrobilin synthase
- EC 1.3.7.7: ferredoxin:protochlorophyllide reductase (ATP-dependent)
- EC 1.3.7.8: benzoyl-CoA reductase
- EC 1.3.7.9: 4-hydroxybenzoyl-CoA reductase
- EC 1.3.7.10: pentalenolactone synthase
- EC 1.3.7.15: chlorophyllide a reductase

=== EC 1.3.8 With a flavin as acceptor ===
- EC 1.3.8.1: short-chain acyl-CoA dehydrogenase
- EC 1.3.8.2: 4,4′-diapophytoene desaturase (4,4′-diapolycopene-forming)
- EC 1.3.8.3: (R)-benzylsuccinyl-CoA dehydrogenase
- EC 1.3.8.4: isovaleryl-CoA dehydrogenase
- EC 1.3.8.5: 2-methyl-branched-chain-enoyl-CoA reductase
- EC 1.3.8.6: glutaryl-CoA dehydrogenase (ETF)
- EC 1.3.8.7: medium-chain acyl-CoA dehydrogenase
- EC 1.3.8.8: long-chain acyl-CoA dehydrogenase
- EC 1.3.8.9: very-long-chain acyl-CoA dehydrogenase
- EC 1.3.8.10: cyclohex-1-ene-1-carbonyl-CoA dehydrogenase
- EC 1.3.8.11: cyclohexane-1-carbonyl-CoA dehydrogenase (electron-transfer flavoprotein)
- EC 1.3.8.12: (2S)-methylsuccinyl-CoA dehydrogenase
- EC 1.3.8.13: crotonobetainyl-CoA reductase
- EC 1.3.8.14: L-prolyl-[peptidyl-carrier protein] dehydrogenase
- EC 1.3.8.15: 3-(aryl)acrylate reductase
- EC 1.3.8.16: 2-amino-4-deoxychorismate dehydrogenase
- EC 1.3.8.17: dehydro coenzyme F_{420} reductase

=== EC 1.3.98 With other,known physiological acceptors ===
- EC 1.3.98.1: dihydroorotate dehydrogenase (fumarate)
- EC 1.3.98.2: Now EC 1.3.4.1, fumarate reductase (CoM/CoB)
- EC 1.3.98.3: coproporphyrinogen dehydrogenase
- EC 1.3.98.4: 5a,11a-dehydrotetracycline reductase
- EC 1.3.98.5: hydrogen peroxide-dependent heme synthase
- EC 1.3.98.6: AdoMet-dependent heme synthase
- EC 1.3.98.7: [mycofactocin precursor peptide]-tyrosine decarboxylase

=== EC 1.3.99 With unknown physiological acceptors ===
- EC 1.3.99.1: The activity is included in EC 1.3.5.1, succinate dehydrogenase (quinone)
- EC 1.3.99.2: Now EC 1.3.8.1, butyryl-CoA dehydrogenase.
- EC 1.3.99.3: now EC 1.3.8.7, medium-chain acyl-CoA dehydrogenase, EC 1.3.8.8, long-chain acyl-CoA dehydrogenase and EC 1.3.8.9, very-long-chain acyl-CoA dehydrogenase
- EC 1.3.99.4: 3-oxosteroid 1-dehydrogenase
- EC 1.3.99.5: 3-oxo-5α-steroid 4-dehydrogenase (acceptor)
- EC 1.3.99.6: 3-oxo-5β-steroid 4-dehydrogenase
- EC 1.3.99.7: Now EC 1.3.8.6, glutaryl-CoA dehydrogenase
- EC 1.3.99.8: 2-furoyl-CoA dehydrogenase
- EC 1.3.99.9: Now EC 1.21.99.1, β-cyclopiazonate dehydrogenase
- EC 1.3.99.10: Now EC 1.3.8.4, isovaleryl-CoA dehydrogenase
- EC 1.3.99.11: transferred to EC 1.3.5.2, dihydroorotate dehydrogenase
- EC 1.3.99.12: Now classified as EC 1.3.8.5, 2-methyl-branched-chain-enoyl-CoA reductase
- EC 1.3.99.13: Now EC 1.3.8.8, long-chain-acyl-CoA dehydrogenase
- EC 1.3.99.14: cyclohexanone dehydrogenase
- EC 1.3.99.15: Now EC 1.3.7.8
- EC 1.3.99.16: isoquinoline 1-oxidoreductase
- EC 1.3.99.17: quinoline 2-oxidoreductase
- EC 1.3.99.18: quinaldate 4-oxidoreductase
- EC 1.3.99.19: quinoline-4-carboxylate 2-oxidoreductase
- EC 1.3.99.20: Now EC 1.3.7.9, 4-hydroxybenzoyl-CoA reductase
- EC 1.3.99.21: Now EC 1.3.8.3, (R)-benzylsuccinyl-CoA dehydrogenase
- EC 1.3.99.22: Now EC 1.3.98.3, coproporphyrinogen dehydrogenase
- EC 1.3.99.23: all-trans-retinol 13,14-reductase
- EC 1.3.99.24: Now EC 1.3.8.16, 2-amino-4-deoxychorismate dehydrogenase
- EC 1.3.99.25: carvone reductase
- EC 1.3.99.26: all-trans-ζ-carotene desaturase
- EC 1.3.99.27: 1-hydroxycarotenoid 3,4-desaturase
- EC 1.3.99.28: phytoene desaturase (neurosporene-forming)
- EC 1.3.99.29: phytoene desaturase (zeta-carotene-forming)
- EC 1.3.99.30: phytoene desaturase (3,4-didehydrolycopene-forming)
- EC 1.3.99.31: phytoene desaturase (lycopene-forming)
- EC 1.3.99.32: glutaryl-CoA dehydrogenase (non-decarboxylating)
- EC 1.3.99.33: urocanate reductase
- EC 1.3.99.34: Now classified as EC 1.3.7.11, 2,3-bis-O-geranylgeranyl-sn-glycero-phospholipid reductase
- EC 1.3.99.35: Now EC 1.3.7.15, chlorophyllide a reductase *
- EC 1.3.99.36: cypemycin cysteine dehydrogenase (decarboxylating)
- EC 1.3.99.37: 1-hydroxy-2-isopentenylcarotenoid 3,4-desaturase
- EC 1.3.99.38: menaquinone-9 β-reductase
- EC 1.3.99.39: carotenoid φ-ring synthase
- EC 1.3.99.40: carotenoid χ-ring synthase

== EC 1.4 Acting on the CH-NH_{2} group of donors ==
=== EC 1.4.1 With NAD^{+} or NADP^{+} as acceptor ===
- EC 1.4.1.1: alanine dehydrogenase
- EC 1.4.1.2: glutamate dehydrogenase
- EC 1.4.1.3: glutamate dehydrogenase (NAD(P)^{+})
- EC 1.4.1.4: glutamate dehydrogenase (NADP^{+})
- EC 1.4.1.5: L-amino-acid dehydrogenase
- EC 1.4.1.6: deleted, Now included with EC 1.21.4.1, D-proline reductase (dithiol)
- EC 1.4.1.7: serine 2-dehydrogenase
- EC 1.4.1.8: valine dehydrogenase (NADP^{+})
- EC 1.4.1.9: leucine dehydrogenase
- EC 1.4.1.10: glycine dehydrogenase
- EC 1.4.1.11: L-erythro-3,5-diaminohexanoate dehydrogenase
- EC 1.4.1.12: 2,4-diaminopentanoate dehydrogenase
- EC 1.4.1.13: glutamate synthase (NADPH)
- EC 1.4.1.14: glutamate synthase (NADH)
- EC 1.4.1.15: lysine dehydrogenase
- EC 1.4.1.16: diaminopimelate dehydrogenase
- EC 1.4.1.17: N-methylalanine dehydrogenase
- EC 1.4.1.18: lysine 6-dehydrogenase
- EC 1.4.1.19: tryptophan dehydrogenase
- EC 1.4.1.20: phenylalanine dehydrogenase
- EC 1.4.1.21: aspartate dehydrogenase
- EC 1.4.1.22: there is no overall consumption of NAD^{+} during the reaction. As a result, transfer of the enzyme from EC 4.3.1.12 was not necessary and EC 1.4.1.22 was withdrawn before being made official
- EC 1.4.1.23: valine dehydrogenase (NAD^{+})
- EC 1.4.1.24: 3-dehydroquinate synthase II
- EC 1.4.1.25: L-arginine dehydrogenase
- EC 1.4.1.26: 2,4-diaminopentanoate dehydrogenase (NAD^{+})
- EC 1.4.1.27: glycine cleavage system

=== EC 1.4.2 With a cytochrome as acceptor ===
- EC 1.4.2.1: glycine dehydrogenase (cytochrome)
- EC 1.4.2.3: pseudooxynicotine oxidase

=== EC 1.4.3 With oxygen as acceptor ===
- EC 1.4.3.1: D-aspartate oxidase
- EC 1.4.3.2: L-amino-acid oxidase
- EC 1.4.3.3: D-amino-acid oxidase
- EC 1.4.3.4: monoamine oxidase
- EC 1.4.3.5: pyridoxal 5′-phosphate synthase
- EC 1.4.3.6: replaced by two enzymes, EC 1.4.3.21 (primary-amine oxidase) and EC 1.4.3.22 (diamine oxidase)
- EC 1.4.3.7: D-glutamate oxidase
- EC 1.4.3.8: ethanolamine oxidase
- EC 1.4.3.9: Now included with EC 1.4.3.4 amine oxidase (flavin-containing)
- EC 1.4.3.10: putrescine oxidase
- EC 1.4.3.11: L-glutamate oxidase
- EC 1.4.3.12: cyclohexylamine oxidase
- EC 1.4.3.13: protein-lysine 6-oxidase
- EC 1.4.3.14: L-lysine oxidase
- EC 1.4.3.15: D-glutamate(D-aspartate) oxidase
- EC 1.4.3.16: L-aspartate oxidase
- EC 1.4.3.17: Now EC 1.3.3.10, tryptophan α,β-oxidase
- EC 1.4.3.18: Not approved as the enzyme was shown to be a dehydrogenase and not an oxidase (see EC 1.5.99.12, cytokinin dehydrogenase)
- EC 1.4.3.19: glycine oxidase
- EC 1.4.3.20: L-lysine 6-oxidase
- EC 1.4.3.21: primary-amine oxidase
- EC 1.4.3.22: diamine oxidase
- EC 1.4.3.23: 7-chloro-L-tryptophan oxidase
- EC 1.4.3.24: Now EC 1.4.2.3, pseudooxynicotine oxidase
- EC 1.4.3.25: L-arginine oxidase
- EC 1.4.3.26: pre-mycofactocin synthase

=== EC 1.4.4 With a disulfide as acceptor ===
- EC 1.4.4.1: Now EC 1.21.4.1, D-proline reductase (dithiol)
- EC 1.4.4.2: glycine dehydrogenase (aminomethyl-transferring)

=== EC 1.4.5 With a quinone or other compound as acceptor ===
- EC 1.4.5.1: D-amino acid dehydrogenase (quinone)

=== EC 1.4.7 With an iron–sulfur protein as acceptor ===
- EC 1.4.7.1: glutamate synthase (ferredoxin)

=== EC 1.4.9 With a copper protein as acceptor ===
- EC 1.4.9.1: methylamine dehydrogenase (amicyanin)
- EC 1.4.9.2: aralkylamine dehydrogenase (azurin)

=== EC 1.4.98 With other, known physiological acceptors ===
- EC 1.4.98.1: NOW 1.4.9.1 methylamine dehydrogenase (amicyanin)

=== EC 1.4.99 With unknown physiological acceptors ===
- EC 1.4.99.1: Now EC 1.4.99.6, D-arginine dehydrogenase
- EC 1.4.99.2: taurine dehydrogenase
- EC 1.4.99.3: Now EC 1.4.9.1, methylamine dehydrogenase (amicyanin)
- EC 1.4.99.4: Now EC 1.4.9.2, aralkylamine dehydrogenase (azurin)
- EC 1.4.99.5: glycine dehydrogenase (cyanide-forming)
- EC 1.4.99.6: D-arginine dehydrogenase

== EC 1.5 Acting on the CH-NH group of donors ==
=== EC 1.5.1 With NAD^{+} or NADP^{+} as acceptor ===
- EC 1.5.1.1: 1-piperideine-2-carboxylate/1-pyrroline-2-carboxylate reductase (NAD(P)H)
- EC 1.5.1.2: pyrroline-5-carboxylate reductase
- EC 1.5.1.3: dihydrofolate reductase
- EC 1.5.1.4: Now included with EC 1.5.1.3 dihydrofolate reductase
- EC 1.5.1.5: methylenetetrahydrofolate dehydrogenase (NADP^{+})
- EC 1.5.1.6: formyltetrahydrofolate dehydrogenase
- EC 1.5.1.7: saccharopine dehydrogenase (NAD^{+}, L-lysine-forming)
- EC 1.5.1.8: saccharopine dehydrogenase (NADP^{+}, L-lysine-forming)
- EC 1.5.1.9: saccharopine dehydrogenase (NAD^{+}, L-glutamate-forming)
- EC 1.5.1.10: saccharopine dehydrogenase (NADP^{+}, L-glutamate-forming)
- EC 1.5.1.11: D-octopine dehydrogenase
- EC 1.5.1.12: Now EC 1.2.1.88, L-glutamate γ-semialdehyde dehydrogenase
- EC 1.5.1.13: Now EC 1.17.1.5, nicotinate dehydrogenase
- EC 1.5.1.14: Now included with EC 1.5.1.21 Δ^{1}-piperideine-2-carboxylate reductase
- EC 1.5.1.15: methylenetetrahydrofolate dehydrogenase (NAD^{+})
- EC 1.5.1.16: D-lysopine dehydrogenase
- EC 1.5.1.17: alanopine dehydrogenase
- EC 1.5.1.18: ephedrine dehydrogenase
- EC 1.5.1.19: D-nopaline dehydrogenase
- EC 1.5.1.20: methylenetetrahydrofolate reductase (NAD(P)H)
- EC 1.5.1.21: 1-piperideine-2-carboxylate/1-pyrroline-2-carboxylate reductase (NADPH)
- EC 1.5.1.22: strombine dehydrogenase
- EC 1.5.1.23: tauropine dehydrogenase
- EC 1.5.1.24: N^{5}-(carboxyethyl)ornithine synthase
- EC 1.5.1.25: thiomorpholine-carboxylate dehydrogenase
- EC 1.5.1.26: β-alanopine dehydrogenase
- EC 1.5.1.27: 1,2-dehydroreticulinium reductase (NADPH)
- EC 1.5.1.28: opine dehydrogenase
- EC 1.5.1.29: Now covered by EC 1.5.1.38 [FMN reductase (NADPH)], EC 1.5.1.39 [FMN reductase [NAD(P)H])] and EC 1.5.1.41 (riboflavin reductase [NAD(P)H])
- EC 1.5.1.30: flavin reductase (NADPH)
- EC 1.5.1.31: berberine reductase
- EC 1.5.1.32: vomilenine reductase
- EC 1.5.1.33: pteridine reductase
- EC 1.5.1.34: 6,7-dihydropteridine reductase
- EC 1.5.1.35: identical to EC 1.2.1.19, aminobutyraldehyde dehydrogenase, as the substrates 1-pyrroline and 4-aminobutanal are interconvertible
- EC 1.5.1.36: flavin reductase (NADH)
- EC 1.5.1.37: FAD reductase (NADH)
- EC 1.5.1.38: FMN reductase (NADPH)
- EC 1.5.1.39: FMN reductase (NAD(P)H)
- EC 1.5.1.40: 8-hydroxy-5-deazaflavin:NADPH oxidoreductase
- EC 1.5.1.41: riboflavin reductase (NAD(P)H)
- EC 1.5.1.42: FMN reductase (NADH)
- EC 1.5.1.43: carboxynorspermidine synthase
- EC 1.5.1.44: festuclavine dehydrogenase
- EC 1.5.1.45: FAD reductase (NAD(P)H)
- EC 1.5.1.46: agroclavine dehydrogenase
- EC 1.5.1.47: dihydromethanopterin reductase [NAD(P)^{+}]
- EC 1.5.1.48: 2-methyl-1-pyrroline reductase
- EC 1.5.1.49: 1-pyrroline-2-carboxylate reductase [NAD(P)H]
- EC 1.5.1.50: dihydromonapterin reductase
- EC 1.5.1.51: N-[(2S)-2-amino-2-carboxyethyl]-L-lutamate dehydrogenase
- EC 1.5.1.52: staphylopine dehydrogenase
- EC 1.5.1.53: methylenetetrahydrofolate reductase (NADPH)
- EC 1.5.1.54: methylenetetrahydrofolate reductase (NADH)

=== EC 1.5.3 With oxygen as acceptor ===
- EC 1.5.3.1: sarcosine oxidase
- EC 1.5.3.2: N-methyl-L-amino-acid oxidase
- EC 1.5.3.3: deleted
- EC 1.5.3.4: N^{6}-methyl-lysine oxidase
- EC 1.5.3.5: (S)-6-hydroxynicotine oxidase
- EC 1.5.3.6: (R)-6-hydroxynicotine oxidase
- EC 1.5.3.7: L-pipecolate oxidase
- EC 1.5.3.8: Now included with EC 1.3.3.8, tetrahydroberberine oxidase
- EC 1.5.3.9: Now EC 1.21.3.3, reticuline oxidase
- EC 1.5.3.10: dimethylglycine oxidase
- EC 1.5.3.11: Now included with EC 1.5.3.13 (N^{1}-acetylpolyamine oxidase), EC 1.5.3.14 (polyamine oxidase (propane-1,3-diamine-forming)), EC 1.5.3.15 (N^{8}-acetylspermidine oxidase (propane-1,3-diamine-forming)), EC 1.5.3.16 (spermine oxidase) and EC 1.5.3.17 (non-specific polyamine oxidase)
- EC 1.5.3.12: dihydrobenzophenanthridine oxidase
- EC 1.5.3.13: N^{1}-acetylpolyamine oxidase
- EC 1.5.3.14: polyamine oxidase (propane-1,3-diamine-forming)
- EC 1.5.3.15: N^{8}-acetylspermidine oxidase (propane-1,3-diamine-forming)
- EC 1.5.3.16: spermine oxidase
- EC 1.5.3.17: non-specific polyamine oxidase
- EC 1.5.3.18: L-saccharopine oxidase
- EC 1.5.3.19: 4-methylaminobutanoate oxidase (formaldehyde-forming)
- EC 1.5.3.20: N-alkylglycine oxidase
- EC 1.5.3.21: 4-methylaminobutanoate oxidase (methylamine-forming)
- EC 1.5.3.22: coenzyme F_{420}H_{2} oxidase
- EC 1.5.3.23: glyphosate oxidoreductase

=== EC 1.5.4 With a disulfide as acceptor ===
- EC 1.5.4.1: pyrimidodiazepine synthase

=== EC 1.5.5 With a quinone or similar compound as acceptor ===
- EC 1.5.5.1: electron-transferring-flavoprotein dehydrogenase
- EC 1.5.5.2: proline dehydrogenase
- EC 1.5.5.3: hydroxyproline dehydrogenase

=== EC 1.5.7 With an iron–sulfur protein as acceptor ===
- EC 1.5.7.1: methylenetetrahydrofolate reductase (ferredoxin)
- EC 1.5.7.2: coenzyme F_{420} oxidoreductase (ferredoxin)

=== EC 1.5.8 With a flavin or flavoprotein as acceptor ===
- EC 1.5.8.1: dimethylamine dehydrogenase
- EC 1.5.8.2: trimethylamine dehydrogenase
- EC 1.5.8.3: sarcosine dehydrogenase
- EC 1.5.8.4: dimethylglycine dehydrogenase

=== EC 1.5.98 With other, known, physiological acceptors ===
- EC 1.5.98.1: ethylenetetrahydromethanopterin dehydrogenase
- EC 1.5.98.2: 5,10-methylenetetrahydromethanopterin reductase
- EC 1.5.98.3: coenzyme F_{420}:methanophenazine dehydrogenase

=== EC 1.5.99 With unknown physiological acceptors ===
- EC 1.5.99.1: Now EC 1.5.8.3, sarcosine dehydrogenase
- EC 1.5.99.2: Now EC 1.5.8.4, dimethylglycine dehydrogenase
- EC 1.5.99.3: L-pipecolate dehydrogenase
- EC 1.5.99.4: nicotine dehydrogenase
- EC 1.5.99.5: methylglutamate dehydrogenase
- EC 1.5.99.6: spermidine dehydrogenase
- EC 1.5.99.7: Now EC 1.5.8.2, trimethylamine dehydrogenase
- EC 1.5.99.8: Now EC 1.5.5.2, proline dehydrogenase
- EC 1.5.99.9: transferred to EC 1.5.98.1, methylenetetrahydromethanopterin dehydrogenase
- EC 1.5.99.10: Now EC 1.5.8.1, dimethylamine dehydrogenase
- EC 1.5.99.11: transferred to EC 1.5.98.2, 5,10-methylenetetrahydromethanopterin reductase
- EC 1.5.99.12: cytokinin dehydrogenase
- EC 1.5.99.13: D-proline dehydrogenase
- EC 1.5.99.14: 6-hydroxypseudooxynicotine dehydrogenase
- EC 1.5.99.15: dihydromethanopterin reductase (acceptor)

== EC 1.6 Acting on NADH or NADPH ==
=== EC 1.6.1 With NAD or NADP as acceptor ===
- EC 1.6.1.1: NAD(P)^{+} transhydrogenase (Si-specific)
- EC 1.6.1.2: NAD(P)^{+} transhydrogenase (Re/Si-specific)

=== EC 1.6.2 With a heme protein as acceptor ===
- EC 1.6.2.1: now EC 1.6.99.3 NADH dehydrogenase
- EC 1.6.2.2: cytochrome-b_{5} reductase
- EC 1.6.2.3: deleted
- EC 1.6.2.4: NADPH—hemoprotein reductase
- EC 1.6.2.5: NADPH—cytochrome-c_{2} reductase
- EC 1.6.2.6: leghemoglobin reductase

=== EC 1.6.3 With oxygen as acceptor ===
- EC 1.6.3.1: NAD(P)H oxidase (H_{2}O_{2}-forming)
- EC 1.6.3.2: NAD(P)H oxidase (H_{2}O-forming)
- EC 1.6.3.3: NADH oxidase (H_{2}O_{2}-forming)
- EC 1.6.3.4: NADH oxidase (H_{2}O-forming)
- EC 1.6.3.5: renalase

=== EC 1.6.4 With a disulfide as acceptor (deleted sub-class) ===
- EC 1.6.4.1: now EC 1.8.1.6 cystine reductase
- EC 1.6.4.2: now EC 1.8.1.7 glutathione-disulfide reductase
- EC 1.6.4.3: now EC 1.8.1.4 dihydrolipoyl dehydrogenase
- EC 1.6.4.4: now EC 1.8.1.8 protein-disulfide reductase
- EC 1.6.4.5: now EC 1.8.1.9 thioredoxin-disulfide reductase
- EC 1.6.4.6: now EC 1.8.1.10 CoA-glutathione reductase
- EC 1.6.4.7: now EC 1.8.1.11 asparagusate reductase
- EC 1.6.4.8: now EC 1.8.1.12 trypanothione-disulfide reductase
- EC 1.6.4.9: now EC 1.8.1.13 bis-γ-glutamylcystine reductase
- EC 1.6.4.10: now EC 1.8.1.14 CoA-disulfide reductase

=== EC 1.6.5 With a quinone or similar compound as acceptor ===
- EC 1.6.5.1: deleted
- EC 1.6.5.2: NAD(P)H dehydrogenase (quinone)
- EC 1.6.5.3: now EC 7.1.1.2 NADH:ubiquinone reductase (H^{+}-translocating)
- EC 1.6.5.4: monodehydroascorbate reductase (NADH)
- EC 1.6.5.5: NADPH:quinone reductase
- EC 1.6.5.6: p-benzoquinone reductase (NADPH)
- EC 1.6.5.7: 2-hydroxy-1,4-benzoquinone reductase
- EC 1.6.5.8: Now EC 7.2.1.1, NADH:ubiquinone reductase (Na^{+}-transporting)
- EC 1.6.5.9: NADH:ubiquinone reductase (non-electrogenic)
- EC 1.6.5.10: NADPH dehydrogenase (quinone)
- EC 1.6.5.11: Identical to EC 1.6.5.9, NADH:quinone reductase (non-electrogenic)
- EC 1.6.5.12: demethylphylloquinone reductase

=== EC 1.6.6 With a nitrogenous group as acceptor ===
- EC 1.6.6.1: Now EC 1.7.1.1, nitrate reductase (NADH)
- EC 1.6.6.2: Now EC 1.7.1.2, nitrate reductase [NAD(P)H]
- EC 1.6.6.3: Now EC 1.7.1.3, nitrate reductase (NADPH)
- EC 1.6.6.4: Now EC 1.7.1.4, nitrite reductase [NAD(P)H]
- EC 1.6.6.5: Now EC 1.7.2.1, nitrite reductase (NO-forming)
- EC 1.6.6.6: Now EC 1.7.1.5, hyponitrite reductase
- EC 1.6.6.7: Now EC 1.7.1.6, azobenzene reductase
- EC 1.6.6.8: Now EC 1.7.1.7, GMP reductase
- EC 1.6.6.9: Now known to be catalysed by EC 1.7.2.3, trimethylamine-N-oxide reductase
- EC 1.6.6.10: Now EC 1.7.1.9, nitroquinoline-N-oxide reductase]
- EC 1.6.6.11: Now EC 1.7.1.10, hydroxylamine reductase (NADH)
- EC 1.6.6.12: Now EC 1.7.1.11, 4-(dimethylamino)phenylazoxybenzene reductase
- EC 1.6.6.13: Now EC 1.7.1.12, N-hydroxy-2-acetamidofluorene reductase

=== EC 1.6.7 With an iron–sulfur protein as acceptor (deleted sub-subclass) ===
- EC 1.6.7.1: now EC 1.18.1.2 ferredoxin—NADP^{+} reductase
- EC 1.6.7.2: now EC 1.18.1.1 rubredoxin—NAD^{+} reductase
- EC 1.6.7.3: now EC 1.18.1.3 ferredoxin—NAD^{+} reductase

=== EC 1.6.8 With a flavin as acceptor (deleted sub-subclass) ===
- EC 1.6.8.1: Now EC 1.5.1.29 FMN reductase
- EC 1.6.8.2: Now EC 1.5.1.30 flavin reductase

=== EC 1.6.99 With unknown physiological acceptors ===
- EC 1.6.99.1: NADPH dehydrogenase
- EC 1.6.99.2: Now EC 1.6.5.2, NAD(P)H dehydrogenase (quinone
- EC 1.6.99.3: The activity is covered by EC 7.1.1.2, NADH:ubiquinone reductase (H+-translocating)
- EC 1.6.99.4: Now EC 1.18.1.2, ferredoxin—NADP^{+} reductase
- EC 1.6.99.5: Now EC 1.6.5.11, NADH dehydrogenase (quinone)
- EC 1.6.99.6: Now EC 1.6.5.10, NADPH dehydrogenase (quinone)
- EC 1.6.99.7: Now EC 1.5.1.34, 6,7-dihydropteridine reductase
- EC 1.6.99.8: Deleted
- EC 1.6.99.9: Now EC 1.16.1.4, cob(II)alamin reductase
- EC 1.6.99.10: included in EC 1.5.1.34, 6,7-dihydropteridine reductase
- EC 1.6.99.11: Deleted
- EC 1.6.99.12: Now EC 1.16.1.6, cyanocobalamin reductase (cyanide-eliminating)
- EC 1.6.99.13: Now EC 1.16.1.7, ferric-chelate reductase

== EC 1.7 Acting on other nitrogenous compounds as donors ==
=== EC 1.7.1 With NAD^{+} or NADP^{+} as acceptor ===
- EC 1.7.1.1: nitrate reductase (NADH)
- EC 1.7.1.2: nitrate reductase (NAD(P)H)
- EC 1.7.1.3: nitrate reductase (NADPH)
- EC 1.7.1.4: nitrite reductase (NAD(P)H)
- EC 1.7.1.5: hyponitrite reductase
- EC 1.7.1.6: azobenzene reductase
- EC 1.7.1.7: GMP reductase
- EC 1.7.1.8: deleted
- EC 1.7.1.9: nitroquinoline-N-oxide reductase
- EC 1.7.1.10: hydroxylamine reductase (NADH)
- EC 1.7.1.11: 4-(dimethylamino)phenylazoxybenzene reductase
- EC 1.7.1.12: N-hydroxy-2-acetamidofluorene reductase
- EC 1.7.1.13: preQ_{1} synthase
- EC 1.7.1.14: nitric oxide reductase (NAD(P), nitrous oxide-forming)
- EC 1.7.1.15: nitrite reductase (NADH)
- EC 1.7.1.16: nitrobenzene nitroreductase
- EC 1.7.1.17: FMN-dependent NADH-azoreductase

=== EC 1.7.2 With a cytochrome as acceptor ===
- EC 1.7.2.1: nitrite reductase (NO-forming)
- EC 1.7.2.2: nitrite reductase (cytochrome; ammonia-forming)
- EC 1.7.2.3: trimethylamine-N-oxide reductase
- EC 1.7.2.4: nitrous-oxide reductase
- EC 1.7.2.5: nitric oxide reductase (cytochrome c)
- EC 1.7.2.6: hydroxylamine dehydrogenase
- EC 1.7.2.7: hydrazine synthase
- EC 1.7.2.8: hydrazine dehydrogenase

=== EC 1.7.3 With oxygen as acceptor ===
- EC 1.7.3.1: nitroalkane oxidase
- EC 1.7.3.2: acetylindoxyl oxidase
- EC 1.7.3.3: factor-independent urate hydroxylase
- EC 1.7.3.4: Now covered by EC 1.7.2.6, hydroxylamine dehydrogenase, and EC 1.7.3.6, hydroxylamine oxidase (cytochrome)
- EC 1.7.3.5: 3-aci-nitropropanoate oxidase
- EC 1.7.3.6: hydroxylamine oxidase (cytochrome)

=== EC 1.7.5 With a quinone or similar compound as acceptor ===
- EC 1.7.5.1: nitrate reductase (quinone)
- EC 1.7.5.2: nitric oxide reductase (menaquinol)

=== EC 1.7.6 With a nitrogenous group as acceptor ===
- EC 1.7.6.1: nitrite dismutase

=== EC 1.7.7 With an iron–sulfur protein as acceptor ===
- EC 1.7.7.1: ferredoxin—nitrite reductase
- EC 1.7.7.2: ferredoxin—nitrate reductase

=== EC 1.7.99 With other acceptors ===
- EC 1.7.99.1: hydroxylamine reductase
- EC 1.7.99.2: deleted: reaction may have been due to the combined action of EC 1.7.99.6 nitrous-oxide reductase and EC 1.7.99.7 nitric-oxide reductase
- EC 1.7.99.3: Now included with EC 1.7.2.1, nitrite reductase (NO-forming)
- EC 1.7.99.4: Now EC 1.7.1.1, nitrate reductase (NADH), EC 1.7.1.2, nitrate reductase [NAD(P)H], EC 1.7.1.3, nitrate reductase (NADPH), EC 1.7.5.1, nitrate reductase (quinone), EC 1.7.7.2, nitrate reductase (ferredoxin) and EC 1.9.6.1, nitrate reductase (cytochrome)
- EC 1.7.99.5: Now included with EC 1.5.1.20, methylenetetrahydrofolate reductase [NAD(P)H]
- EC 1.7.99.6: Now EC 1.7.2.4 nitrous-oxide reductase
- EC 1.7.99.7: Now EC 1.7.2.5 nitric oxide reductase (cytochrome c)
- EC 1.7.99.8: hydroxylamine oxidoreductase
- EC 1.7.99.8: Now classified as EC 1.7.2.8, hydrazine dehydrogenase

== EC 1.8 Acting on a sulfur group of donors ==
=== EC 1.8.1 With NAD^{+} or NADP^{+} as acceptor ===
- EC 1.8.1.1: deleted
- EC 1.8.1.2: sulfite reductase (NADPH)
- EC 1.8.1.3: deleted; reaction shown to be due to EC 1.14.13.8, flavin-containing monooxygenase
- EC 1.8.1.4: dihydrolipoyl dehydrogenase
- EC 1.8.1.5: 2-oxopropyl-CoM reductase (carboxylating)
- EC 1.8.1.6: cystine reductase
- EC 1.8.1.7: glutathione-disulfide reductase
- EC 1.8.1.8: protein-disulfide reductase
- EC 1.8.1.9: thioredoxin-disulfide reductase
- EC 1.8.1.10: CoA-glutathione reductase
- EC 1.8.1.11: asparagusate reductase
- EC 1.8.1.12: trypanothione-disulfide reductase
- EC 1.8.1.13: bis-γ-glutamylcystine reductase
- EC 1.8.1.14: CoA-disulfide reductase
- EC 1.8.1.15: mycothione reductase
- EC 1.8.1.16: glutathione amide reductase
- EC 1.8.1.17: dimethylsulfone reductase
- EC 1.8.1.18: NAD(P)H sulfur oxidoreductase (CoA-dependent)
- EC 1.8.1.19: sulfide dehydrogenase
- EC 1.8.1.20: 4,4′-dithiodibutanoate disulfide reductase
- EC 1.8.1.21: dissimilatory dimethyldisulfide reductase
- EC 1.8.1.22: dissimilatory sulfite reductase

=== EC 1.8.2 With a cytochrome as acceptor ===
- EC 1.8.2.1: sulfite dehydrogenase (cytochrome)
- EC 1.8.2.2: thiosulfate dehydrogenase
- EC 1.8.2.3: sulfide-cytochrome-c reductase (flavocytochrome c)
- EC 1.8.2.4: dimethyl sulfide:cytochrome c_{2} reductase
- EC 1.8.2.5: thiosulfate reductase (cytochrome)
- EC 1.8.2.6: S-disulfanyl-L-cysteine oxidoreductase
- EC 1.8.2.7: thiocyanate desulfurase

=== EC 1.8.3 With oxygen as acceptor ===
- EC 1.8.3.1: sulfite oxidase
- EC 1.8.3.2: thiol oxidase
- EC 1.8.3.3: glutathione oxidase
- EC 1.8.3.4: methanethiol oxidase
- EC 1.8.3.5: prenylcysteine oxidase
- EC 1.8.3.6: farnesylcysteine lyase
- EC 1.8.3.7: formylglycine-generating enzyme

=== EC 1.8.4 With a disulfide as acceptor ===
- EC 1.8.4.1: glutathione—homocystine transhydrogenase
- EC 1.8.4.2: protein-disulfide reductase (glutathione)
- EC 1.8.4.3: glutathione—CoA-glutathione transhydrogenase
- EC 1.8.4.4: glutathione—cystine transhydrogenase
- EC 1.8.4.5: Now EC 1.8.4.13, L-methionine (S)-S-oxide reductase and EC 1.8.4.14, L-methionine (R)-S-oxide reductase
- EC 1.8.4.6: due to EC 1.8.4.11, peptide-methionine (S)-S-oxide reductase
- EC 1.8.4.7: enzyme-thiol transhydrogenase (glutathione-disulfide)
- EC 1.8.4.8: phosphoadenylyl-sulfate reductase (thioredoxin)
- EC 1.8.4.9: adenylyl-sulfate reductase (glutathione)
- EC 1.8.4.10: adenylyl-sulfate reductase (thioredoxin)
- EC 1.8.4.11: peptide-methionine (S)-S-oxide reductase
- EC 1.8.4.12: peptide-methionine (R)-S-oxide reductase
- EC 1.8.4.13: L-methionine (S)-S-oxide reductase
- EC 1.8.4.14: L-methionine (R)-S-oxide reductase
- EC 1.8.4.15: protein dithiol oxidoreductase (disulfide-forming)
- EC 1.8.4.16: thioredoxin:protein disulfide reductase

=== EC 1.8.5 With a quinone or similar compound as acceptor ===
- EC 1.8.5.1: glutathione dehydrogenase (ascorbate)
- EC 1.8.5.2: thiosulfate dehydrogenase (quinone)
- EC 1.8.5.3: respiratory dimethylsulfoxide reductase
- EC 1.8.5.4: bacterial sulfide:quinone reductase
- EC 1.8.5.5: thiosulfate reductase (quinone)
- EC 1.8.5.6: sulfite dehydrogenase (quinone)
- EC 1.8.5.7: glutathionyl-hydroquinone reductase
- EC 1.8.5.8: eukaryotic sulfide quinone oxidoreductase
- EC 1.8.5.9: protein dithiol:quinone oxidoreductase DsbB
- EC 1.8.5.10: DsrC-trisulfide reductase

=== EC 1.8.6 With a nitrogenous group as acceptor (deleted sub-subclass) ===
- EC 1.8.6.1: Now included with EC 2.5.1.18 glutathione transferase

=== EC 1.8.7 With an iron–sulfur protein as acceptor ===
- EC 1.8.7.1: assimilatory sulfite reductase (ferredoxin)
- EC 1.8.7.2: ferredoxin:thioredoxin reductase
- EC 1.8.7.3: ferredoxin:CoB-CoM heterodisulfide reductase

=== EC 1.8.98 With other, known, acceptors ===
- EC 1.8.98.1: dihydromethanophenazine:CoB-CoM heterodisulfide reductase
- EC 1.8.98.2: sulfiredoxin

=== EC 1.8.99 With other acceptors ===
- EC 1.8.99.1: Now covered by EC 1.8.1.2, assimilatory sulfite reductase (NADPH) and EC 1.8.7.1, assimilatory sulfite reductase (ferredoxin)
- EC 1.8.99.2: adenylyl-sulfate reductase
- EC 1.8.99.3: an in vitro artifact of EC 1.8.1.22, dissimilatory sulfite reductase
- EC 1.8.99.4: Now EC 1.8.4.8, phosphoadenylyl-sulfate reductase (thioredoxin)
- EC 1.8.99.5: Now EC 1.8.1.22, dissimilatory sulfite reductase

== EC 1.9 Acting on a heme group of donors ==
=== EC 1.9.3 With oxygen as acceptor ===
- EC 1.9.3.1: Now EC 7.1.1.9, cytochrome-c oxidase
- EC 1.9.3.2: Now included with EC 1.7.2.1, nitrite reductase (NO-forming)

=== EC 1.9.6 With a nitrogenous group as acceptor ===
- EC 1.9.6.1: nitrate reductase (cytochrome)

=== EC 1.9.98 With other, known, physiological acceptors ===
- EC 1.9.98.1: iron—cytochrome-c reductase

=== EC 1.9.99 With other acceptors ===
- EC 1.9.99.1: Now EC 1.9.98.1, iron—cytochrome-c reductase

== EC 1.10 Acting on diphenols and related substances as donors ==
=== EC 1.10.1 With NAD^{+} or NADP^{+} as acceptor ===
- EC 1.10.1.1: trans-acenaphthene-1,2-diol dehydrogenase

=== EC 1.10.2 With a cytochrome as acceptor ===
- EC 1.10.2.1: The activity is covered by EC 7.2.1.3, ascorbate ferrireductase (transmembrane)
- EC 1.10.2.2: Now EC 7.1.1.8, quinol—cytochrome-c reductase

=== EC 1.10.3 With oxygen as acceptor ===
- EC 1.10.3.1: catechol oxidase
- EC 1.10.3.2: laccase
- EC 1.10.3.3: L-ascorbate oxidase
- EC 1.10.3.4: o-aminophenol oxidase
- EC 1.10.3.5: 3-hydroxyanthranilate oxidase
- EC 1.10.3.6: rifamycin-B oxidase
- EC 1.10.3.7: Now EC 1.21.3.4, sulochrin oxidase [(+)-bisdechlorogeodin-forming]
- EC 1.10.3.8: Now EC 1.21.3.5, sulochrin oxidase [(-)-bisdechlorogeodin-forming]
- EC 1.10.3.9: photosystem II
- EC 1.10.3.10: Now EC 7.1.1.3, ubiquinol oxidase (H^{+}-transporting)
- EC 1.10.3.11: ubiquinol oxidase (non-electrogenic)
- EC 1.10.3.12: Now EC 7.1.1.5, menaquinol oxidase (H^{+}-transporting)
- EC 1.10.3.13: Now EC 7.1.1.4, caldariellaquinol oxidase (H^{+}-transporting)
- EC 1.10.3.14: Now EC 7.1.1.7, ubiquinol oxidase (electrogenic, proton-motive force generating)
- EC 1.10.3.15: grixazone synthase
- EC 1.10.3.16: dihydrophenazinedicarboxylate synthase
- EC 1.10.3.17: superoxide oxidase

=== EC 1.10.5 With a quinone or related compound as acceptor ===
- EC 1.10.5.1: ribosyldihydronicotinamide dehydrogenase (quinone)

=== EC 1.10.9 With a copper protein as acceptor ===
- EC 1.10.9.1: Now EC 7.1.1.6, plastoquinol—plastocyanin reductase

=== EC 1.10.99 With unknown physiological acceptors ===
- EC 1.10.99.1: Now EC 1.10.9.1 plastoquinol—plastocyanin reductase
- EC 1.10.99.2: Now EC 1.10.5.1 ribosyldihydronicotinamide dehydrogenase (quinone)
- EC 1.10.99.3: Now EC 1.23.5.1 violaxanthin de-epoxidase

== EC 1.11 Acting on a peroxide as acceptor ==
=== EC 1.11.1 Peroxidases ===
- EC 1.11.1.1: NADH peroxidase
- EC 1.11.1.2: NADPH peroxidase
- EC 1.11.1.3: fatty-acid peroxidase
- EC 1.11.1.4: Now EC 1.13.11.11 EC 1.13.11.11 tryptophan 2,3-dioxygenase
- EC 1.11.1.5: cytochrome-c peroxidase
- EC 1.11.1.6: catalase
- EC 1.11.1.7: peroxidase
- EC 1.11.1.8: iodide peroxidase
- EC 1.11.1.9: glutathione peroxidase
- EC 1.11.1.10: chloride peroxidase
- EC 1.11.1.11: L-ascorbate peroxidase
- EC 1.11.1.12: phospholipid-hydroperoxide glutathione peroxidase
- EC 1.11.1.13: manganese peroxidase
- EC 1.11.1.14: lignin peroxidase
- EC 1.11.1.15: Now described by EC 1.11.1.24, thioredoxin-dependent peroxiredoxin; EC 1.11.1.25, glutaredoxin-dependent peroxiredoxin; EC 1.11.1.26, NADH-dependent peroxiredoxin; EC 1.11.1.27, glutathione-dependent peroxiredoxin; EC 1.11.1.28, lipoyl-dependent peroxiredoxin; and EC 1.11.1.29, mycoredoxin-dependent peroxiredoxin
- EC 1.11.1.16: versatile peroxidase
- EC 1.11.1.17: glutathione amide-dependent peroxidase
- EC 1.11.1.18: bromide peroxidase
- EC 1.11.1.19: dye decolorizing peroxidase
- EC 1.11.1.20: prostamide/prostaglandin F_{2α} synthase
- EC 1.11.1.21: catalase-peroxidase
- EC 1.11.1.22: hydroperoxy fatty acid reductase
- EC 1.11.1.23: (S)-2-hydroxypropylphosphonic acid epoxidase
- EC 1.11.1.24: thioredoxin-dependent peroxiredoxin
- EC 1.11.1.25: glutaredoxin-dependent peroxiredoxin
- EC 1.11.1.26: NADH-dependent peroxiredoxin
- EC 1.11.1.27: glutathione-dependent peroxiredoxin
- EC 1.11.1.28: lipoyl-dependent peroxiredoxin
- EC 1.11.1.29: mycoredoxin-dependent peroxiredoxin

=== EC 1.11.2 Peroxygenase ===
- EC 1.11.2.1: unspecific peroxygenase
- EC 1.11.2.2: myeloperoxidase
- EC 1.11.2.3: plant seed peroxygenase
- EC 1.11.2.4: fatty-acid peroxygenase
- EC 1.11.2.5: 3-methyl-L-tyrosine peroxygenase
- EC 1.11.2.6: L-tyrosine peroxygenase

== EC 1.12 Acting on hydrogen as donor ==
=== EC 1.12.1 With NAD^{+} or NADP^{+} as acceptor ===
- EC 1.12.1.1: Now EC 1.12.7.2, ferredoxin hydrogenase
- EC 1.12.1.2: hydrogen dehydrogenase
- EC 1.12.1.3: hydrogen dehydrogenase (NADP^{+})
- EC 1.12.1.4: hydrogenase (NAD^{+}, ferredoxin)
- EC 1.12.1.5: hydrogen dehydrogenase [NAD(P)^{+}]

=== EC 1.12.2 With a cytochrome as acceptor ===
- EC 1.12.2.1: cytochrome-c_{3} hydrogenase

=== EC 1.12.5 With a quinone or similar compound as acceptor ===
- EC 1.12.5.1: hydrogen:quinone oxidoreductase

=== EC 1.12.7 With an iron–sulfur protein as acceptor ===
- EC 1.12.7.1: Now EC 1.12.7.2, ferredoxin hydrogenase
- EC 1.12.7.2: ferredoxin hydrogenase

=== EC 1.12.98 With other known acceptors ===
- EC 1.12.98.1: coenzyme F_{420} hydrogenase
- EC 1.12.98.2: 5,10-methenyltetrahydromethanopterin hydrogenase
- EC 1.12.98.3: Methanosarcina-phenazine hydrogenase
- EC 1.12.98.4: Sulfhydrogenase

=== EC 1.12.99 With unknown physiological acceptors ===
- EC 1.12.99.1: Now EC 1.12.98.1, coenzyme F_{420} hydrogenase
- EC 1.12.99.2: Now shown to be two enzymes, EC 1.12.98.3, Methanosarcina-phenazine hydrogenase and EC 1.8.98.1, CoB—CoM heterodisulfide reductase
- EC 1.12.99.3: Now EC 1.12.5.1, hydrogen:quinone oxidoreductase
- EC 1.12.99.4: Now EC 1.12.98.2, 5,10-methenyltetrahydromethanopterin hydrogenase
- EC 1.12.99.5: Identical to EC 1.13.11.47, 3-hydroxy-4-oxoquinoline 2,4-dioxygenase
- EC 1.12.99.6: hydrogenase (acceptor)

== EC 1.13 Acting on single donors with incorporation of molecular oxygen (oxygenases) ==
=== EC 1.13.11 With incorporation of two atoms of oxygen ===
- EC 1.13.11.1: catechol 1,2-dioxygenase
- EC 1.13.11.2: catechol 2,3-dioxygenase
- EC 1.13.11.3: protocatechuate 3,4-dioxygenase
- EC 1.13.11.4: gentisate 1,2-dioxygenase
- EC 1.13.11.5: homogentisate 1,2-dioxygenase
- EC 1.13.11.6: 3-hydroxyanthranilate 3,4-dioxygenase
- EC 1.13.11.7: deleted
- EC 1.13.11.8: protocatechuate 4,5-dioxygenase
- EC 1.13.11.9: 2,5-dihydroxypyridine 5,6-dioxygenase
- EC 1.13.11.10: 7,8-dihydroxykynurenate 8,8a-dioxygenase
- EC 1.13.11.11: tryptophan 2,3-dioxygenase
- EC 1.13.11.12: linoleate 13S-lipoxygenas
- EC 1.13.11.13: The activity is the sum of several enzymatic and spontaneous reactions
- EC 1.13.11.14: 2,3-dihydroxybenzoate 3,4-dioxygenase
- EC 1.13.11.15: 3,4-dihydroxyphenylacetate 2,3-dioxygenase
- EC 1.13.11.16: 3-carboxyethylcatechol 2,3-dioxygenase
- EC 1.13.11.17: indole 2,3-dioxygenase
- EC 1.13.11.18: persulfide dioxygenase
- EC 1.13.11.19: cysteamine dioxygenase
- EC 1.13.11.20: cysteine dioxygenase
- EC 1.13.11.21: Now EC 1.14.99.36, β-carotene 15,15′-monooxygenase
- EC 1.13.11.22: caffeate 3,4-dioxygenase
- EC 1.13.11.23: 2,3-dihydroxyindole 2,3-dioxygenase
- EC 1.13.11.24: quercetin 2,3-dioxygenase
- EC 1.13.11.25: 3,4-dihydroxy-9,10-secoandrosta-1,3,5(10)-triene-9,17-dione 4,5-dioxygenase
- EC 1.13.11.26: peptide-tryptophan 2,3-dioxygenase
- EC 1.13.11.27: 4-hydroxyphenylpyruvate dioxygenase
- EC 1.13.11.28: 2,3-dihydroxybenzoate 2,3-dioxygenase
- EC 1.13.11.29: stizolobate synthase
- EC 1.13.11.30: stizolobinate synthase
- EC 1.13.11.31: arachidonate 12-lipoxygenase
- EC 1.13.11.32: Now EC 1.13.12.16, nitronate monooxygenase
- EC 1.13.11.33: arachidonate 15-lipoxygenase
- EC 1.13.11.34: arachidonate 5-lipoxygenase
- EC 1.13.11.35: pyrogallol 1,2-oxygenase
- EC 1.13.11.36: chloridazon-catechol dioxygenase
- EC 1.13.11.37: hydroxyquinol 1,2-dioxygenase
- EC 1.13.11.38: 1-hydroxy-2-naphthoate 1,2-dioxygenase
- EC 1.13.11.39: biphenyl-2,3-diol 1,2-dioxygenase
- EC 1.13.11.40: arachidonate 8-lipoxygenase
- EC 1.13.11.41: 2,4′-dihydroxyacetophenone dioxygenase
- EC 1.13.11.42: identical to EC 1.13.11.11, tryptophan 2,3-dioxygenase
- EC 1.13.11.43: lignostilbene αβ-dioxygenase
- EC 1.13.11.44: Activity is covered by EC 1.13.11.60, linoleate 8R-lipoxygenase and EC 5.4.4.6, 9,12-octadecadienoate 8-hydroperoxide 8S-isomerase
- EC 1.13.11.45: linoleate 11-lipoxygenase
- EC 1.13.11.46: 4-hydroxymandelate synthase
- EC 1.13.11.47: 3-hydroxy-4-oxoquinoline 2,4-dioxygenase
- EC 1.13.11.48: 3-hydroxy-2-methyl-quinolin-4-one 2,4-dioxygenase
- EC 1.13.11.49: chlorite O_{2}-lyase
- EC 1.13.11.50: acetylacetone-cleaving enzyme
- EC 1.13.11.51: 9-cis-epoxycarotenoid dioxygenase
- EC 1.13.11.52: indoleamine 2,3-dioxygenase
- EC 1.13.11.53: acireductone dioxygenase (Ni^{2+}-requiring)
- EC 1.13.11.54: acireductone dioxygenase [iron(II)-requiring]
- EC 1.13.11.55: sulfur oxygenase/reductase
- EC 1.13.11.56: 1,2-dihydroxynaphthalene dioxygenase
- EC 1.13.11.57: gallate dioxygenase
- EC 1.13.11.58: linoleate 9S-lipoxygenase
- EC 1.13.11.59: torulene dioxygenase
- EC 1.13.11.60: inoleate 8R-lipoxygenase
- EC 1.13.11.61: linolenate 9R-lipoxygenase
- EC 1.13.11.62: linoleate 10R-lipoxygenase
- EC 1.13.11.63: β-carotene 15,15′-dioxygenase
- EC 1.13.11.64: 5-nitrosalicylate dioxygenase
- EC 1.13.11.65: carotenoid isomerooxygenase
- EC 1.13.11.66: hydroquinone 1,2-dioxygenase
- EC 1.13.11.67: 8′-apo-β-carotenoid 14′,13′-cleaving dioxygenase
- EC 1.13.11.68: 9-cis-β-carotene 9′,10′-cleaving dioxygenase
- EC 1.13.11.69: carlactone synthase
- EC 1.13.11.70: all-trans-10′-apo-β-carotenal 13,14-cleaving dioxygenase
- EC 1.13.11.71: carotenoid-9′,10′-cleaving dioxygenase
- EC 1.13.11.72: 2-hydroxyethylphosphonate dioxygenase
- EC 1.13.11.73: methylphosphonate synthase
- EC 1.13.11.74: 2-aminophenol 1,6-dioxygenase
- EC 1.13.11.75: all-trans-8′-apo-β-carotenal 15,15′-oxygenase
- EC 1.13.11.76: 2-amino-5-chlorophenol 1,6-dioxygenase
- EC 1.13.11.77: oleate 10S-lipoxygenase
- EC 1.13.11.78: 2-amino-1-hydroxyethylphosphonate dioxygenase (glycine-forming)
- EC 1.13.11.79: aerobic 5,6-dimethylbenzimidazole synthase
- EC 1.13.11.80: (3,5-dihydroxyphenyl)acetyl-CoA 1,2-dioxygenase
- EC 1.13.11.81: 7,8-dihydroneopterin oxygenase
- EC 1.13.11.82: 8′-apo-carotenoid 13,14-cleaving dioxygenase
- EC 1.13.11.83: 4-hydroxy-3-prenylphenylpyruvate oxygenase
- EC 1.13.11.84: crocetin dialdehyde synthase
- EC 1.13.11.85: exo-cleaving rubber dioxygenase
- EC 1.13.11.86: 5-aminosalicylate 1,2-dioxygenase
- EC 1.13.11.87: endo-cleaving rubber dioxygenase
- EC 1.13.11.88: isoeugenol monooxygenase
- EC 1.13.11.89: (hydroxymethyl)phosphonate dioxygenase
- EC 1.13.11.90: [1-hydroxy-2-(trimethylamino)ethyl]phosphonate dioxygenase (glycine-betaine-forming)
- EC 1.13.11.91: 3-mercaptopropionate dioxygenase
- EC 1.13.11.92: fatty acid α-dioxygenase

=== EC 1.13.12 With incorporation of one atom of oxygen (internal monooxygenases or internal mixed function oxidases) ===
- EC 1.13.12.1: arginine 2-monooxygenase
- EC 1.13.12.2: lysine 2-monooxygenase
- EC 1.13.12.3: tryptophan 2-monooxygenase
- EC 1.13.12.4: lactate 2-monooxygenase
- EC 1.13.12.5: Renilla-type luciferase
- EC 1.13.12.6: Cypridina-luciferin 2-monooxygenase
- EC 1.13.12.7: firefly luciferase
- EC 1.13.12.8: Watasenia-luciferin 2-monooxygenase
- EC 1.13.12.9: phenylalanine 2-monooxygenase
- EC 1.13.12.10: Reaction covered by EC 1.14.13.59, L-lysine 6-monooxygenase (NADPH)
- EC n1.13.12.11: The activity is due to EC 1.14.13.8, flavin-containing monooxygenase
- EC 1.13.12.12: transferred to EC 1.13.11.67, 8-apo-β-carotenoid 14′,13′-cleaving dioxygenase
- EC 1.13.12.13: Oplophorus-luciferin 2-monooxygenase
- EC 1.13.12.14: Now EC 1.14.13.122, chlorophyllide-a oxygenase
- EC 1.13.12.15: 3,4-dihydroxyphenylalanine oxidative deaminase
- EC 1.13.12.16: nitronate monooxygenase
- EC 1.13.12.17: dichloroarcyriaflavin A synthase
- EC 1.13.12.18: dinoflagellate luciferase
- EC 1.13.12.19: 2-oxoglutarate dioxygenase (ethene-forming)
- EC 1.13.12.20: noranthrone monooxygenase
- EC 1.13.12.21: tetracenomycin-F1 monooxygenase
- EC 1.13.12.22: deoxynogalonate monooxygenase
- EC 1.13.12.23: 4-hydroxy-3-prenylbenzoate synthase
- EC 1.13.12.24: calcium-regulated photoprotein

=== EC 1.13.99 Miscellaneous ===
- EC 1.13.99.1: inositol oxygenase
- EC 1.13.99.2: Now EC 1.14.12.10, benzoate 1,2-dioxygenase
- EC 1.13.99.3: tryptophan 2′-dioxygenase
- EC 1.13.99.4: Now EC 1.14.12.9, 4-chlorophenylacetate 3,4-dioxygenase
- EC 1.13.99.5: now EC 1.13.11.47, 3-hydroxy-4-oxoquinoline 2,4-dioxygenase

== EC 1.14 Acting on paired donors, with incorporation or reduction of molecular oxygen ==
=== EC 1.14.1 With NADH or NADPH as one donor (deleted sub-subclass) ===
- EC 1.14.1.1: now EC 1.14.14.1, unspecific monooxygenase
- EC 1.14.1.2: now EC 1.14.13.9, kynurenine 3-monooxygenase
- EC 1.14.1.3: deleted, covered by EC 1.14.99.7, squalene monooxygenase and EC 5.4.99.7, lanosterol synthase
- EC 1.14.1.4: now EC 1.14.99.2, kynurenine 7,8-hydroxylase
- EC 1.14.1.5: now EC 1.14.13.5; imidazoleacetate 4-monooxygenase
- EC 1.14.1.6: now EC 1.14.15.4, steroid 11β-monooxygenase
- EC 1.14.1.7: now EC 1.14.99.9, steroid 17α-monooxygenase
- EC 1.14.1.8: now EC 1.14.99.10, steroid 21-monooxygenase
- EC 1.14.1.9: deleted
- EC 1.14.1.10: now EC 1.14.99.11 estradiol 6β-monooxygenase
- EC 1.14.1.11: deleted

=== EC 1.14.2 With ascorbate as one donor (deleted sub-subclass) ===
- EC 1.14.2.1: now EC 1.14.17.1, dopamine β-monooxygenase
- EC 1.14.2.2: now EC 1.13.11.27, 4-hydroxyphenylpyruvate dioxygenase

=== EC 1.14.3 With reduced pteridine as one donor (deleted sub-subclass) ===
- EC 1.14.3.1: now EC 1.14.16.1, phenylalanine 4-monooxygenase

=== EC 1.14.11 With 2-oxoglutarate as one donor, and incorporation of one atom each of oxygen into both donors ===
- EC 1.14.11.1: γ-butyrobetaine dioxygenase
- EC 1.14.11.2: procollagen-proline dioxygenase
- EC 1.14.11.3: pyrimidine-deoxynucleoside 2′-dioxygenase
- EC 1.14.11.4: procollagen-lysine 5-dioxygenase
- EC 1.14.11.5: Now included with EC 1.14.11.6 thymine dioxygenase
- EC 1.14.11.6: thymine dioxygenase
- EC 1.14.11.7: procollagen-proline 3-dioxygenase
- EC 1.14.11.8: trimethyllysine dioxygenase
- EC 1.14.11.9: flavanone 3-dioxygenase
- EC 1.14.11.10: pyrimidine-deoxynucleoside 1′-dioxygenase
- EC 1.14.11.11: hyoscyamine (6S)-dioxygenase
- EC 1.14.11.12: gibberellin-44 dioxygenase
- EC 1.14.11.13: gibberellin 2β-dioxygenase
- EC 1.14.11.14: Now EC 1.14.20.13, 6β-hydroxyhyoscyamine epoxidase
- EC 1.14.11.15: gibberellin 3β-dioxygenase
- EC 1.14.11.16: peptide-aspartate β-dioxygenase
- EC 1.14.11.17: taurine dioxygenase
- EC 1.14.11.18: phytanoyl-CoA dioxygenase
- EC 1.14.11.19: Now EC 1.14.20.4, anthocyanidin synthase
- EC 1.14.11.20: deacetoxyvindoline 4-hydroxylase
- EC 1.14.11.21: clavaminate synthase
- EC 1.14.11.22: Now EC 1.14.20.5, flavone synthase
- EC 1.14.11.23: Now EC 1.14.20.6, flavonol synthase
- EC 1.14.11.24: 2′-deoxymugineic-acid 2′-dioxygenase
- EC 1.14.11.25: mugineic-acid 3-dioxygenase
- EC 1.14.11.26: deacetoxycephalosporin-C hydroxylase
- EC 1.14.11.27: [histone H3]-dimethyl-L-lysine^{36} demethylase
- EC 1.14.11.28: proline 3-hydroxylase
- EC 1.14.11.29: hypoxia-inducible factor-proline dioxygenase
- EC 1.14.11.30: hypoxia-inducible factor-asparagine dioxygenase
- EC 1.14.11.31: thebaine 6-O-demethylase
- EC 1.14.11.32: codeine 3-O-demethylase
- EC 1.14.11.33: DNA oxidative demethylase
- EC 1.14.11.34: Now EC 1.14.20.7, 2-oxoglutarate/L-arginine monooxygenase/decarboxylase (succinate-forming)
- EC 1.14.11.35: 1-deoxypentalenic acid 11β-hydroxylase
- EC 1.14.11.36: pentalenolactone F synthase
- EC 1.14.11.36: pentalenolactone F synthase
- EC 1.14.11.37: kanamycin B dioxygenase
- EC 1.14.11.38: verruculogen synthase
- EC 1.14.11.39: L-asparagine hydroxylase
- EC 1.14.11.40: enduracididine β-hydroxylase
- EC 1.14.11.41: L-arginine hydroxylase
- EC 1.14.11.42: tRNA^{Phe} (7-(3-amino-3-carboxypropyl)wyosine^{37}-C^{2})-hydroxylase
- EC 1.14.11.43: (S)-dichlorprop dioxygenase (2-oxoglutarate)
- EC 1.14.11.44: (R)-dichlorprop dioxygenase (2-oxoglutarate)
- EC 1.14.11.45: L-isoleucine 4-hydroxylase
- EC 1.14.11.46: 2-aminoethylphosphonate dioxygenase
- EC 1.14.11.47: [50S ribosomal protein L16]-arginine 3-hydroxylase
- EC 1.14.11.48: xanthine dioxygenase
- EC 1.14.11.49: uridine-5′-phosphate dioxygenase
- EC|1.14.11.50: Now EC 1.14.20.8, (–)-deoxypodophyllotoxin synthase
- EC 1.14.11.51: DNA N^{6}-methyladenine demethylase
- EC 1.14.11.52: validamycin A dioxygenase
- EC 1.14.11.53: mRNA N^{6}-methyladenine demethylase
- EC 1.14.11.54: mRNA N^{1}-methyladenine demethylase
- EC 1.14.11.55: ectoine hydroxylase
- EC 1.14.11.56: L-proline cis-4-hydroxylase
- EC 1.14.11.57: L-proline trans-4-hydroxylase
- EC 1.14.11.58: ornithine lipid ester-linked acyl 2-hydroxylase
- EC 1.14.11.59: 2,4-dihydroxy-1,4-benzoxazin-3-one-glucoside dioxygenase
- EC 1.14.11.60: scopoletin 8-hydroxylase
- EC 1.14.11.61: feruloyl-CoA 6-hydroxylase
- EC 1.14.11.62: trans-4-coumaroyl-CoA 2-hydroxylase
- EC 1.14.11.63: peptidyl-lysine (3S)-dioxygenase
- EC 1.14.11.64: glutarate dioxygenase
- EC 1.14.11.65: [histone H3]-dimethyl-L-lysine^{9} demethylase
- EC 1.14.11.66: [histone H3]-trimethylL-lysine^{9} demethylase
- EC 1.14.11.67: [histone H3]-trimethyl-LL-lysine^{4} demethylase
- EC 1.14.11.68: [histone H3]-trimethyl-L-lysine^{27} demethylase
- EC 1.14.11.69: [histone H3]-trimethyl-L-lysine^{37} demethylase
- EC 1.14.11.70: 7-deoxycylindrospermopsin hydroxylase
- EC 1.14.11.71: methylphosphonate hydroxylase
- EC 1.14.11.72: [2-(trimethylamino)ethyl]phosphonate dioxygenase
- EC 1.14.11.73: [protein]-arginine 3-hydroxylase
- EC 1.14.11.74: L-isoleucine 3^{1}-dioxygenase
- EC 1.14.11.75: 3^{1}-hydroxy-L-isoleucine 4-dioxygenase
- EC 1.14.11.76: L-glutamate 3(R)-hydroxylase
- EC 1.14.11.77: alkyl sulfatase

=== EC 1.14.12 With NADH or NADPH as one donor, and incorporation of two atoms of oxygen into one donor ===
- EC 1.14.12.1: anthranilate 1,2-dioxygenase (deaminating, decarboxylating)
- EC 1.14.12.2: Now EC 1.14.13.35 anthranilate 3-monooxygenase (deaminating)
- EC 1.14.12.3: benzene 1,2-dioxygenase
- EC 1.14.12.4: EC 1.14.13.242, 3-hydroxy-2-methylpyridinecarboxylate monooxygenase
- EC 1.14.12.5: Now EC .14.13.241, 5-pyridoxate monooxygenase
- EC 1.14.12.6: Now EC 1.14.13.66, 2-hydroxycyclohexanone 2-monooxygenase
- EC 1.14.12.7: phthalate 4,5-dioxygenase
- EC 1.14.12.8: 4-sulfobenzoate 3,4-dioxygenase
- EC 1.14.12.9: 4-chlorophenylacetate 3,4-dioxygenase
- EC 1.14.12.10: benzoate 1,2-dioxygenase
- EC 1.14.12.11: toluene dioxygenase
- EC 1.14.12.12: naphthalene 1,2-dioxygenase
- EC 1.14.12.13: 2-halobenzoate 1,2-dioxygenase
- EC 1.14.12.14: 2-aminobenzenesulfonate 2,3-dioxygenase
- EC 1.14.12.15: terephthalate 1,2-dioxygenase
- EC 1.14.12.16: 2-hydroxyquinoline 5,6-dioxygenase
- EC 1.14.12.17: nitric oxide dioxygenase
- EC 1.14.12.18: biphenyl 2,3-dioxygenase
- EC 1.14.12.19: 3-phenylpropionate dioxygenase
- EC 1.14.12.20: Now classified as EC 1.14.15.17, pheophorbide a oxygenase.
- EC 1.14.12.21: Now EC 1.14.13.208, benzoyl-CoA 2,3-epoxidase
- EC 1.14.12.22: carbazole 1,9a-dioxygenase
- EC 1.14.12.23: nitroarene dioxygenase
- EC 1.14.12.24: 2,4-dinitrotoluene dioxygenase
- EC 1.14.12.25: p-cumate 2,3-dioxygenase
- EC 1.14.12.26: chlorobenzene dioxygenase

=== EC 1.14.13 With NADH or NADPH as one donor, and incorporation of one atom of oxygen into the other donor ===
- EC 1.14.13.1: salicylate 1-monooxygenase
- EC 1.14.13.2: 4-hydroxybenzoate 3-monooxygenase
- EC 1.14.13.3: Now EC 1.14.14.9, 4-hydroxyphenylacetate 3-monooxygenase
- EC 1.14.13.4: melilotate 3-monooxygenase
- EC 1.14.13.5: imidazoleacetate 4-monooxygenase
- EC 1.14.13.6: orcinol 2-monooxygenase
- EC 1.14.13.7: phenol 2-monooxygenase
- EC 1.14.13.8: flavin-containing monooxygenase
- EC 1.14.13.9: kynurenine 3-monooxygenase
- EC 1.14.13.10: 2,6-dihydroxypyridine 3-monooxygenase
- EC 1.14.13.11: Now EC 1.14.14.91, trans-cinnamate 4-monooxygenase
- EC 1.14.13.12: Now EC 1.14.14.92, benzoate 4-monooxygenase
- EC 1.14.13.13: Now classified as EC 1.14.15.18, calcidiol 1-monooxygenase
- EC 1.14.13.14: trans-cinnamate 2-monooxygenase
- EC 1.14.13.15: Now EC 1.14.15.15, cholestanetriol 26-monooxygenase
- EC 1.14.13.16: cyclopentanone monooxygenase
- EC 1.14.13.17: Now EC 1.14.14.23, cholesterol 7α-monooxygenase
- EC 1.14.13.18: 4-hydroxyphenylacetate 1-monooxygenase
- EC 1.14.13.19: taxifolin 8-monooxygenase
- EC 1.14.13.20: 2,4-dichlorophenol 6-monooxygenase
- EC 1.14.13.21: Now EC 1.14.14.82, flavonoid 3′-monooxygenase
- EC 1.14.13.22: cyclohexanone monooxygenase
- EC 1.14.13.23: 3-hydroxybenzoate 4-monooxygenase
- EC 1.14.13.24: 3-hydroxybenzoate 6-monooxygenase
- EC 1.14.13.25: methane monooxygenase (soluble)
- EC 1.14.13.26: Now classified as EC 1.14.18.4, phosphatidylcholine 12-monooxygenase
- EC 1.14.13.27: 4-aminobenzoate 1-monooxygenase
- EC 1.14.13.28: Now EC 1.14.14.93, 3,9-dihydroxypterocarpan 6a-monooxygenase
- EC 1.14.13.29: 4-nitrophenol 2-monooxygenase
- EC 1.14.13.30: Now EC 1.14.14.94, leukotriene-B_{4} 20-monooxygenase
- EC 1.14.13.31: 2-nitrophenol 2-monooxygenase
- EC 1.14.13.32: albendazole monooxygenase
- EC 1.14.13.33: 4-hydroxybenzoate 3-monooxygenase (NAD(P)H)
- EC 1.14.13.34: leukotriene-E_{4} 20-monooxygenase
- EC 1.14.13.35: anthranilate 3-monooxygenase (deaminating)
- EC 1.14.13.36: Now EC 1.14.14.96, 5-O-(4-coumaroyl)-D-quinate 3′-monooxygenase
- EC 1.14.13.37: Now EC 1.14.14.97, methyltetrahydroprotoberberine 14-monooxygenase
- EC 1.14.13.38: anhydrotetracycline monooxygenase
- EC 1.14.13.39: nitric-oxide synthase
- EC 1.14.13.40: anthraniloyl-CoA monooxygenase
- EC 1.14.13.41: Now EC 1.14.14.36, tyrosine N-monooxygenase
- EC 1.14.13.42: The activity is covered by EC 1.14.13.68, 4-hydroxyphenylacetaldehyde oxime monooxygenase
- EC 1.14.13.43: questin monooxygenase
- EC 1.14.13.44: 2-hydroxybiphenyl 3-monooxygenase
- EC 1.14.13.45: Now EC 1.14.18.2, CMP-N-acetylneuraminate monooxygenase
- EC 1.14.13.46: (-)-menthol monooxygenase
- EC 1.14.13.47: Now EC 1.14.14.99, (S)-limonene 3-monooxygenase
- EC 1.14.13.48: Now classified as EC 1.14.14.51, (S)-limonene 6-monooxygenase
- EC 1.14.13.49: Now classified as EC 1.14.14.52, (S)-limonene 7-monooxygenase
- EC 1.14.13.50: pentachlorophenol monooxygenase
- EC 1.14.13.51: 6-oxocineole dehydrogenase
- EC 1.14.13.52: Now EC 1.14.14.88, isoflavone 3′-hydroxylase
- EC 1.14.13.53: Now EC 1.14.14.89, 4′-methoxyisoflavone 2′-hydroxylase
- EC 1.14.13.54: ketosteroid monooxygenase
- EC 1.14.13.55: Now EC 1.14.14.98, protopine 6-monooxygenase
- EC 1.14.13.56: Now EC 1.14.14.100, dihydrosanguinarine 10-monooxygenase
- EC 1.14.13.57: Now EC 1.14.14.101, dihydrochelirubine 12-monooxygenase
- EC 1.14.13.58: benzoyl-CoA 3-monooxygenase
- EC 1.14.13.59: L-lysine N^{6}-monooxygenase (NADPH)
- EC 1.14.13.60: Now included with EC 1.14.13.100, 25-hydroxycholesterol 7α-hydroxylase
- EC 1.14.13.61: 2-hydroxyquinoline 8-monooxygenase
- EC 1.14.13.62: 4-hydroxyquinoline 3-monooxygenase
- EC 1.14.13.63: 3-hydroxyphenylacetate 6-hydroxylase
- EC 1.14.13.64: 4-hydroxybenzoate 1-hydroxylase
- EC 1.14.13.65: deleted
- EC 1.14.13.66: 2-hydroxycyclohexanone 2-monooxygenase
- EC 1.14.13.67: Now EC 1.14.14.55, quinine 3-monooxygenase
- EC 1.14.13.68: Now EC 1.14.14.37, 4-hydroxyphenylacetaldehyde oxime monooxygenase
- EC 1.14.13.69: alkene monooxygenase
- EC 1.14.13.70: Now EC 1.14.14.154, sterol 14α-demethylase
- EC 1.14.13.71: Now EC 1.14.14.102, N-methylcoclaurine 3′-monooxygenase
- EC 1.14.13.72: Now classified as EC 1.14.18.9, methylsterol monooxygenase
- EC 1.14.13.73: Now EC 1.14.14.103, tabersonine 16-hydroxylase
- EC 1.14.13.74: Now EC 1.14.14.85, 7-deoxyloganin 7-hydroxylase
- EC 1.14.13.75: Now EC 1.14.14.104, vinorine hydroxylase
- EC 1.14.13.76: Now EC 1.14.14.105, taxane 10β-hydroxylase
- EC 1.14.13.77: Now EC 1.14.14.106, taxane 13α-hydroxylase
- EC 1.14.13.78: Now EC 1.14.14.86, ent-kaurene monooxygenase
- EC 1.14.13.79: Now EC 1.14.14.107, ent-kaurenoic acid oxidase
- EC 1.14.13.80: Now classified as EC 1.14.14.53, (R)-limonene 6-monooxygenase
- EC 1.14.13.81: magnesium-protoporphyrin IX monomethyl ester (oxidative) cyclase
- EC 1.14.13.82: vanillate monooxygenase
- EC 1.14.13.83: precorrin-3B synthase
- EC 1.14.13.84: 4-hydroxyacetophenone monooxygenase
- EC 1.14.13.85: Now EC 1.14.14.135, glyceollin synthase
- EC 1.14.13.86: The activity is covered by EC 1.14.14.87, 2-hydroxyisoflavanone synthase
- EC 1.14.13.87: Now EC 1.14.14.140, licodione synthase]
- EC 1.14.13.88: Now EC 1.14.14.81, flavanoid 3,5-hydroxylase
- EC 1.14.13.89: Now EC 1.14.14.90, isoflavone 2-hydroxylase
- EC 1.14.13.90: Now EC 1.14.15.21, zeaxanthin epoxidase
- EC 1.14.13.91: Now EC 1.14.14.136, deoxysarpagine hydroxylase
- EC 1.14.13.92: phenylacetone monooxygenase
- EC 1.14.13.93: Now EC 1.14.14.137, (+)-abscisic acid 8-hydroxylase
- EC 1.14.13.94: Now EC 1.14.14.138, lithocholate 6β-hydroxylase
- EC 1.14.13.95: Now included with EC 1.14.14.139, 5β-cholestane-3α,7α-diol 12α-hydroxylase
- EC 1.14.13.96: Now EC 1.14.14.139, 5β-cholestane-3α,7α-diol 12α-hydroxylase
- EC 1.14.13.97: Now EC 1.14.14.57, taurochenodeoxycholate 6α-hydroxylase
- EC 1.14.13.98: Now EC 1.14.14.25, cholesterol 24-hydroxylase
- EC 1.14.13.99: Now EC 1.14.14.26, 24-hydroxycholesterol 7α-hydroxylase
- EC 1.14.13.100: Now classified as EC 1.14.14.29, 25/26-hydroxycholesterol 7α-hydroxylase
- EC 1.14.13.101: senecionine N-oxygenase
- EC 1.14.13.102: Now EC 1.14.14.141, psoralen synthase
- EC 1.14.13.103: Now EC 1.14.14.142, 8-dimethylallylnaringenin 2-hydroxylase
- EC 1.14.13.104: Now EC 1.14.14.143, (+)-menthofuran synthase
- EC 1.14.13.105: monocyclic monoterpene ketone monooxygenase
- EC 1.14.13.106: now classified as EC 1.14.15.39, epi-isozizaene 5-monooxygenase.
- EC 1.14.13.107: limonene 1,2-monooxygenase
- EC 1.14.13.108: Now EC 1.14.14.144, abieta-7,13-diene hydroxylase
- EC 1.14.13.109: Now EC 1.14.14.145, abieta-7,13-dien-18-ol hydroxylase
- EC 1.14.13.110: Now EC 1.14.14.146, geranylgeraniol 18-hydroxylase
- EC 1.14.13.111: methanesulfonate monooxygenase
- EC 1.14.13.112: Now EC 1.14.14.147, 3-epi-6-deoxocathasterone 23-monooxygenase
- EC 1.14.13.113: FAD-dependent urate hydroxylase
- EC 1.14.13.114: 6-hydroxynicotinate 3-monooxygenase
- EC 1.14.13.115: Now EC 1.14.14.148, angelicin synthase
- EC 1.14.13.116: Now EC 1.14.14.174, geranylhydroquinone 3-hydroxylase
- EC 1.14.13.117: Now EC 1.14.14.39, isoleucine N-monooxygenase
- EC 1.14.13.118: Now EC 1.14.14.38, valine N-monooxygenase
- EC 1.14.13.119: Now EC 1.14.14.149, 5-epiaristolochene 1,3-dihydroxylase
- EC 1.14.13.120: Now EC 1.14.14.150, costunolide synthase
- EC 1.14.13.121: Now EC 1.14.14.151, premnaspirodiene oxygenase
- EC 1.14.13.122: chlorophyllide-a oxygenase
- EC 1.14.13.123: Now EC 1.14.14.95, germacrene A hydroxylase
- EC 1.14.13.124: now classified as EC 1.14.14.40, phenylalanine N-monooxygenase
- EC 1.14.13.125: Now EC 1.14.14.156, tryptophan N-monooxygenase
- EC 1.14.13.126: Now EC 1.14.15.16, vitamin D_{3} 24-hydroxylase
- EC 1.14.13.127: 3-(3-hydroxyphenyl)propanoate hydroxylase
- EC 1.14.13.128: 7-methylxanthine demethylase
- EC 1.14.13.129: Now EC 1.14.15.24, β-carotene 3-hydroxylase
- EC 1.14.13.130: pyrrole-2-carboxylate monooxygenase
- EC 1.14.13.131: dimethyl-sulfide monooxygenase
- EC 1.14.13.132: Now EC 1.14.14.17, squalene monooxygenase
- EC 1.14.13.133: Now EC 1.14.15.32, pentalenene oxygenase
- EC 1.14.13.134: Now EC 1.14.14.152, β-amyrin 11-oxidase
- EC 1.14.13.135: 1-hydroxy-2-naphthoate hydroxylase
- EC 1.14.13.136: Now EC 1.14.14.87, 2-hydroxyisoflavanone synthase
- EC 1.14.13.137: Now EC 1.14.14.153, indole-2-monooxygenase
- EC 1.14.13.138: Now EC 1.14.14.157, indolin-2-one monooxygenase
- EC 1.14.13.139: Now EC 1.14.14.109, 3-hydroxyindolin-2-one monooxygenase
- EC 1.14.13.140: Now EC 1.14.14.110, 2-hydroxy-1,4-benzoxazin-3-one monooxygenase.
- EC 1.14.13.141: Now EC 1.14.15.29, cholest-4-en-3-one 26-monooxygenase [(25S)-3-oxocholest-4-en-26-oate forming]
- EC 1.14.13.142: Now EC 1.14.15.30, 3-ketosteroid 9α-monooxygenase
- EC 1.14.13.143: Now EC 1.14.14.76 ent-isokaurene C2/C3-hydroxylase
- EC 1.14.13.144: Now EC 1.14.14.111, 9β-pimara-7,15-diene oxidase
- EC 1.14.13.145: Now EC 1.14.14.112, ent-cassa-12,15-diene 11-hydroxylase
- EC 1.14.13.146: taxoid 14β-hydroxylase
- EC 1.14.13.147: Now EC 1.14.14.182, taxoid 7β-hydroxylase
- EC 1.14.13.148: trimethylamine monooxygenase
- EC 1.14.13.149: phenylacetyl-CoA 1,2-epoxidase
- EC 1.14.13.150: Now EC 1.14.14.113, α-humulene 10-hydroxylase
- EC 1.14.13.151: Now EC 1.14.14.84, linalool 8-monooxygenase
- EC 1.14.13.152: Now EC 1.14.14.83, geraniol 8-hydroxylase
- EC 1.14.13.153: (+)-sabinene 3-hydroxylase
- EC 1.14.13.154: erythromycin 12-hydroxylase
- EC 1.14.13.155: α-pinene monooxygenase
- EC 1.14.13.156: Now EC 1.14.14.133, 1,8-cineole 2-endo-monooxygenase
- EC 1.14.13.157: Now EC 1.14.14.56, 1,8-cineole 2-exo-monooxygenase
- EC 1.14.13.158: Now EC 1.14.14.114, amorpha-4,11-diene 12-monooxygenase
- EC 1.14.13.159: Now EC 1.14.14.24, vitamin D 25-hydroxylase
- EC 1.14.13.160: (2,2,3-trimethyl-5-oxocyclopent-3-enyl)acetyl-CoA 1,5-monooxygenase
- EC 1.14.13.161: (+)-camphor 6-exo-hydroxylase
- EC 1.14.13.162: Now EC 1.14.14.108, 2,5-diketocamphane 1,2-monooxygenase
- EC 1.14.13.163: 6-hydroxy-3-succinoylpyridine 3-monooxygenase
- EC 1.14.13.164: withdrawn: see EC 1.13.11.65, carotenoid isomerooxygenase
- EC 1.14.13.165: Now classified as EC 1.14.14.47, nitric-oxide synthase (flavodoxin)
- EC 1.14.13.166: 4-nitrocatechol 4-monooxygenase
- EC 1.14.13.167: 4-nitrophenol 4-monooxygenase
- EC 1.14.13.168: indole-3-pyruvate monooxygenase
- EC 1.14.13.169: Now EC 1.14.18.5, sphingolipid C4-monooxygenase
- EC 1.14.13.170: pentalenolactone D synthase
- EC 1.14.13.171: neopentalenolactone D synthase
- EC 1.14.13.172: salicylate 5-hydroxylase
- EC 1.14.13.173: Now EC 1.14.14.115, 11-oxo-β-amyrin 30-oxidase
- EC 1.14.13.174: Now EC 1.14.14.116, averantin hydroxylase
- EC 1.14.13.175: Now EC 1.14.14.117, aflatoxin B synthase
- EC 1.14.13.176: Now EC 1.14.14.118, tryprostatin B 6-hydroxylase
- EC 1.14.13.177: Now EC 1.14.14.119, fumitremorgin C monooxygenase
- EC 1.14.13.178: methylxanthine N^{1}-demethylase
- EC 1.14.13.179: methylxanthine N^{3}-demethylase
- EC 1.14.13.180: aklavinone 12-hydroxylase
- EC 1.14.13.181: 13-deoxydaunorubicin hydroxylase
- EC 1.14.13.182: 2-heptyl-3-hydroxy-4(1H)-quinolone synthase
- EC 1.14.13.183: Now EC 1.14.14.120, dammarenediol 12-hydroxylase
- EC 1.14.13.184: Now EC 1.14.14.121, protopanaxadiol 6-hydroxylase
- EC 1.14.13.185: Now EC 1.14.15.33, pikromycin synthase
- EC 1.14.13.186: Now EC 1.14.15.34, 20-oxo-5-O-mycaminosyltylactone 23-monooxygenase
- EC 1.14.13.187: L-evernosamine nitrososynthase
- EC 1.14.13.188: Now EC 1.14.15.35, 6-deoxyerythronolide B hydroxylase
- EC 1.14.13.189: 5-methyl-1-naphthoate 3-hydroxylase
- EC 1.14.13.190: Now EC 1.14.14.175, ferruginol synthase
- EC 1.14.13.191: Now EC 1.14.14.70, ent-sandaracopimaradiene 3-hydroxylase
- EC 1.14.13.192: Now EC 1.14.14.122, oryzalexin E synthase
- EC 1.14.13.193: Now EC 1.14.14.123, oryzalexin D synthase
- EC 1.14.13.194: Now EC 1.14.14.78, phylloquinone ω-hydroxylase
- EC 1.14.13.195: L-ornithine N^{5}-monooxygenase (NADPH)
- EC 1.14.13.196: L-ornithine N^{5}-monooxygenase [NAD(P)H]
- EC 1.14.13.197: Now EC 1.14.14.124, dihydromonacolin L hydroxylase
- EC 1.14.13.198: Now EC 1.14.14.125, monacolin L hydroxylase
- EC 1.14.13.199: Now EC 1.14.14.79, docosahexaenoic acid ω-hydroxylase
- EC 1.14.13.200: tetracenomycin A2 monooxygenase-dioxygenase
- EC 1.14.13.201: Now EC 1.14.14.126, β-amyrin 28-monooxygenase
- EC 1.14.13.202: Now EC 1.14.14.127, methyl farnesoate epoxidase
- EC 1.14.13.203: Now EC 1.14.14.128, farnesoate epoxidase
- EC 1.14.13.204: Now EC 1.14.14.129, long-chain acyl-CoA ω-monooxygenase
- EC 1.14.13.205: Now EC 1.14.14.80, long-chain fatty acid ω-monooxygenase
- EC 1.14.13.206: Now EC 1.14.14.130, laurate 7-monooxygenase
- EC 1.14.13.207: Now EC 1.14.14.31, ipsdienol synthase
- EC 1.14.13.208: benzoyl-CoA 2,3-epoxidase
- EC 1.14.13.209: salicyloyl-CoA 5-hydroxylase
- EC 1.14.13.210: 4-methyl-5-nitrocatechol 5-monooxygenase
- EC 1.14.13.211: rifampicin monooxygenase
- EC 1.14.13.212: 1,3,7-trimethyluric acid 5-monooxygenase
- EC 1.14.13.213: Now EC 1.14.14.131, bursehernin 5-monooxygenase
- EC 1.14.13.214: Now EC 1.14.14.132, (–)-4′-demethyl-deoxypodophyllotoxin 4-hydroxylase
- EC 1.14.13.215: protoasukamycin 4-monooxygenase
- EC 1.14.13.216: asperlicin C monooxygenase
- EC 1.14.13.217: protodeoxyviolaceinate monooxygenase
- EC 1.14.13.218: 5-methylphenazine-1-carboxylate 1-monooxygenase
- EC 1.14.13.219: resorcinol 4-hydroxylase (NADPH)
- EC 1.14.13.220: resorcinol 4-hydroxylase (NADH)
- EC 1.14.13.221: Now EC 1.14.15.28, cholest-4-en-3-one 26-monooxygenase [(25R)-3-oxocholest-4-en-26-oate forming]
- EC 1.14.13.222: aurachin C monooxygenase/isomerase
- EC 1.14.13.223: 3-hydroxy-4-methylanthranilyl-[aryl-carrier protein] 5-monooxygenase
- EC 1.14.13.224: violacein synthase
- EC 1.14.13.225: F-actin monooxygenase
- EC 1.14.13.226: acetone monooxygenase (methyl acetate-forming)
- EC 1.14.13.227: propane 2-monooxygenase
- EC 1.14.13.228: jasmonic acid 12-hydroxylase
- EC 1.14.13.229: tert-butyl alcohol monooxygenase
- EC 1.14.13.230: butane monooxygenase (soluble)
- EC 1.14.13.231: tetracycline 11a-monooxygenase
- EC 1.14.13.232: 6-methylpretetramide 4-monooxygenase
- EC 1.14.13.233: 4-hydroxy-6-methylpretetramide 12a-monooxygenase
- EC 1.14.13.234: 5a,11a-dehydrotetracycline 5-monooxygenase
- EC 1.14.13.235: indole-3-acetate monooxygenase
- EC 1.14.13.236: toluene 4-monooxygenase
- EC 1.14.13.237: aliphatic glucosinolate S-oxygenase
- EC 1.14.13.238: dimethylamine monooxygenase
- EC 1.14.13.239: carnitine monooxygenase
- EC 1.14.13.240: 2-polyprenylphenol 6-hydroxylase
- EC 1.14.13.241: 5-pyridoxate monooxygenase
- EC 1.14.13.242: 3-hydroxy-2-methylpyridine-5-carboxylate monooxygenase
- EC 1.14.13.243: toluene 2-monooxygenase
- EC 1.14.13.244: phenol 2-monooxygenase (NADH)
- EC 1.14.13.245: assimilatory dimethylsulfide S-monooxygenase
- EC 1.14.13.246: 4β-methylsterol monooxygenase
- EC 1.14.13.247: stachydrine N-demethylase

=== EC 1.14.14 With reduced flavin or flavoprotein as one donor, and incorporation of one atom of oxygen ===
- EC 1.14.14.1: unspecific monooxygenase
- EC 1.14.14.2: Now included with EC 1.14.14.1 unspecific monooxygenase
- EC 1.14.14.3: alkanal monooxygenase (FMN-linked)
- EC 1.14.14.4: identical to EC 1.14.15.7, choline monooxygenase.
- EC 1.14.14.5: alkanesulfonate monooxygenase
- EC 1.14.14.6: Now EC 1.14.13.111, methanesulfonate monooxygenase
- EC 1.14.14.7: transferred to EC 1.14.19.9, tryptophan 7-halogenase
- EC 1.14.14.8: anthranilate 3-monooxygenase (FAD)
- EC 1.14.14.9: 4-hydroxyphenylacetate 3-monooxygenase
- EC 1.14.14.10: nitrilotriacetate monooxygenase
- EC 1.14.14.11: styrene monooxygenase
- EC 1.14.14.12: 3-hydroxy-9,10-secoandrosta-1,3,5(10)-triene-9,17-dione monooxygenase
- EC 1.14.14.13: 4-(γ-L-glutamylamino)butanoyl-[BtrI acyl-carrier protein] monooxygenase
- EC 1.14.14.14: aromatase
- EC 1.14.14.15: (3S)-3-amino-3-(3-chloro-4-hydroxyphenyl)propanoyl-[peptidyl-carrier protein SgcC2] monooxygenase
- EC 1.14.14.16: steroid 21-monooxygenase
- EC 1.14.14.17: squalene monooxygenase
- EC 1.14.14.18: heme oxygenase (biliverdin-producing)
- EC 1.14.14.19: steroid 17α-monooxygenase
- EC 1.14.14.20: phenol 2-monooxygenase (FADH_{2})
- EC 1.14.14.21: dibenzothiophene monooxygenase
- EC 1.14.14.22: dibenzothiophene sulfone monooxygenase
- EC 1.14.14.23: cholesterol 7α-monooxygenase
- EC 1.14.14.24: vitamin D 25-hydroxylase
- EC 1.14.14.25: cholesterol 24-hydroxylase
- EC 1.14.14.26: 24-hydroxycholesterol 7α-hydroxylase
- EC 1.14.14.27: resorcinol 4-hydroxylase (FADH_{2})
- EC 1.14.14.28: long-chain alkane monooxygenase
- EC 1.14.14.29: 25/26-hydroxycholesterol 7α-hydroxylase
- EC 1.14.14.30: isobutylamine N-monooxygenase
- EC 1.14.14.31: ipsdienol synthase
- EC 1.14.14.32: 17α-hydroxyprogesterone deacetylase
- EC 1.14.14.33: ethylenediaminetetraacetate monooxygenase
- EC 1.14.14.34: methanesulfonate monooxygenase (FMNH_{2})
- EC 1.14.14.35: dimethylsulfone monooxygenase
- EC 1.14.14.36: tyrosine N-monooxygenase
- EC 1.14.14.37: 4-hydroxyphenylacetaldehyde oxime monooxygenase
- EC 1.14.14.38: valine N-monooxygenase
- EC 1.14.14.39: isoleucine N-monooxygenase
- EC 1.14.14.40: phenylalanine N-monooxygenase
- EC 1.14.14.41: (E)-2-methylbutanal oxime monooxygenase
- EC 1.14.14.42: homomethionine N-monooxygenase
- EC 1.14.14.43: (methylsulfanyl)alkanaldoxime N-monooxygenase
- EC 1.14.14.44: phenylacetaldehyde oxime monooxygenase
- EC 1.14.14.45: aromatic aldoxime N-monooxygenase
- EC 1.14.14.46: pimeloyl-[acyl-carrier protein] synthase
- EC 1.14.14.47: nitric-oxide synthase (flavodoxin)
- EC 1.14.14.48: jasmonoyl-L-amino acid 12-hydroxylase
- EC 1.14.14.49: 12-hydroxyjasmonoyl-L-amino acid 12-hydroxylase
- EC 1.14.14.50: tabersonine 3-oxygenase
- EC 1.14.14.51: (S)-limonene 6-monooxygenase
- EC 1.14.14.52: (S)-limonene 7-monooxygenase
- EC 1.14.14.53: (R)-limonene 6-monooxygenase
- EC 1.14.14.54: phenylacetate 2-hydroxylase
- EC 1.14.14.55: quinine 3-monooxygenase
- EC 1.14.14.56: 1,8-cineole 2-exo-monooxygenase
- EC 1.14.14.57: taurochenodeoxycholate 6α-hydroxylase
- EC 1.14.14.58: trimethyltridecatetraene synthase
- EC 1.14.14.59: dimethylnonatriene synthase
- EC 1.14.14.60: ferruginol monooxygenase
- EC 1.14.14.61: carnosic acid synthase
- EC 1.14.14.62: salviol synthase
- EC 1.14.14.63: β-amyrin 16β-monooxygenase
- EC 1.14.14.64: β-amyrin 6β-monooxygenase
- EC 1.14.14.65: sugiol synthase
- EC 1.14.14.66: marmesin synthase
- EC 1.14.14.67: 11-hydroxysugiol 20-monooxygenase
- EC 1.14.14.68: syn-pimaradiene 3-monooxygenase
- EC 1.14.14.69: ent-cassadiene hydroxylase
- EC 1.14.14.70: ent-sandaracopimaradiene 3-hydroxylase
- EC 1.14.14.71: cucurbitadienol 11-hydroxylase
- EC 1.14.14.72: drimenol monooxygenase
- EC 1.14.14.73: albendazole monooxygenase (sulfoxide-forming)
- EC 1.14.14.74: albendazole monooxygenase (hydroxylating)
- EC 1.14.14.75: fenbendazole monooxygenase (4′-hydroxylating)
- EC 1.14.14.76: ent-isokaurene C2/C3-hydroxylase
- EC 1.14.14.77: phenylacetonitrile α-monooxygenase
- EC 1.14.14.78: phylloquinone ω-hydroxylase
- EC 1.14.14.79: docosahexaenoic acid ω-hydroxylase
- EC 1.14.14.80: long-chain fatty acid ω-monooxygenase
- EC 1.14.14.81: flavanoid 3′,5′-hydroxylase
- EC 1.14.14.82: flavonoid 3′-monooxygenase
- EC 1.14.14.83: geraniol 8-hydroxylase
- EC 1.14.14.84: linalool 8-monooxygenase
- EC 1.14.14.85: 7-deoxyloganate 7-hydroxylase
- EC 1.14.14.86: ent-kaurene monooxygenase
- EC 1.14.14.87: 2-hydroxyisoflavanone synthase
- EC 1.14.14.88: isoflavone 3′-hydroxylase
- EC 1.14.14.89: 4′-methoxyisoflavone 2′-hydroxylase
- EC 1.14.14.90: isoflavone 2′-hydroxylase
- EC 1.14.14.91: trans-cinnamate 4-monooxygenase
- EC 1.14.14.92: benzoate 4-monooxygenase
- EC 1.14.14.93: 3,9-dihydroxypterocarpan 6a-monooxygenase
- EC 1.14.14.94: leukotriene-B4 20-monooxygenase
- EC 1.14.14.95: germacrene A hydroxylase
- EC 1.14.14.96: 5-O-(4-coumaroyl)-D-quinate 3′-monooxygenase
- EC 1.14.14.97: methyltetrahydroprotoberberine 14-monooxygenase
- EC 1.14.14.98: protopine 6-monooxygenase
- EC 1.14.14.99: (S)-limonene 3-monooxygenase
- EC 1.14.14.100: dihydrosanguinarine 10-monooxygenase
- EC 1.14.14.101: dihydrochelirubine 12-monooxygenase
- EC 1.14.14.102: N-methylcoclaurine 3′-monooxygenase
- EC 1.14.14.103: tabersonine 16-hydroxylase
- EC 1.14.14.104: vinorine hydroxylase
- EC 1.14.14.105: taxane 10β-hydroxylase
- EC 1.14.14.106: taxane 13α-hydroxylase
- EC 1.14.14.107: ent-kaurenoic acid monooxygenase
- EC 1.14.14.108: 2,5-diketocamphane 1,2-monooxygenase
- EC 1.14.14.109: 3-hydroxyindolin-2-one monooxygenase
- EC 1.14.14.110: 2-hydroxy-1,4-benzoxazin-3-one monooxygenase
- EC 1.14.14.111: 9β-pimara-7,15-diene oxidase
- EC 1.14.14.112: ent-cassa-12,15-diene 11-hydroxylase
- EC 1.14.14.113: α-humulene 10-hydroxylase
- EC 1.14.14.114: amorpha-4,11-diene 12-monooxygenase
- EC 1.14.14.115: 11-oxo-β-amyrin 30-oxidase
- EC 1.14.14.116: averantin hydroxylase
- EC 1.14.14.117: aflatoxin B synthase
- EC 1.14.14.118: tryprostatin B 6-hydroxylase
- EC 1.14.14.119: fumitremorgin C monooxygenase
- EC 1.14.14.120: dammarenediol 12-hydroxylase
- EC 1.14.14.121: protopanaxadiol 6-hydroxylase
- EC 1.14.14.122: oryzalexin E synthase
- EC 1.14.14.123: oryzalexin D synthase
- EC 1.14.14.124: dihydromonacolin L hydroxylase
- EC 1.14.14.125: monacolin L hydroxylase
- EC 1.14.14.126: β-amyrin 28-monooxygenase
- EC 1.14.14.127: methyl farnesoate epoxidase
- EC 1.14.14.128: farnesoate epoxidase
- EC 1.14.14.129: long-chain acyl-CoA ω-monooxygenase
- EC 1.14.14.130: laurate 7-monooxygenase
- EC 1.14.14.131: bursehernin 5′-monooxygenase
- EC 1.14.14.132: (–)-4′-demethyl-deoxypodophyllotoxin 4-hydroxylase
- EC 1.14.14.133: 1,8-cineole 2-endo-monooxygenase
- EC 1.14.14.134: β-amyrin 24-hydroxylase
- EC 1.14.14.135: glyceollin synthase
- EC 1.14.14.136: deoxysarpagine hydroxylase
- EC 1.14.14.137: (+)-abscisic acid 8′-hydroxylase
- EC 1.14.14.138: lithocholate 6β-hydroxylase
- EC 1.14.14.139: 5β-cholestane-3α,7α-diol 12α-hydroxylase
- EC 1.14.14.140: Now included with EC 1.14.14.162 EC 1.14.14.162, flavanone 2-hydroxylase
- EC 1.14.14.141: psoralen synthase
- EC 1.14.14.142: 8-dimethylallylnaringenin 2′-hydroxylase
- EC 1.14.14.143: (+)-menthofuran synthase
- EC 1.14.14.144: abieta-7,13-diene hydroxylase
- EC 1.14.14.145: abieta-7,13-dien-18-ol hydroxylase
- EC 1.14.14.146: geranylgeraniol 18-hydroxylase
- EC 1.14.14.147: 3-epi-6-deoxocathasterone 23-monooxygenase
- EC 1.14.14.148: angelicin synthase
- EC 1.14.14.149: 5-epiaristolochene 1,3-dihydroxylase
- EC 1.14.14.150: costunolide synthase
- EC 1.14.14.151: premnaspirodiene oxygenase
- EC 1.14.14.152: β-amyrin 11-oxidase
- EC 1.14.14.153: indole-2-monooxygenase
- EC 1.14.14.154: sterol 14α-demethylase
- EC 1.14.14.155: 3,6-diketocamphane 1,2-monooxygenase
- EC 1.14.14.156: tryptophan N-monooxygenase
- EC 1.14.14.157: indolin-2-one monooxygenase
- EC 1.14.14.158: carotenoid ε hydroxylase
- EC 1.14.14.159: dolabradiene monooxygenase
- EC 1.14.14.160: zealexin A1 synthase
- EC 1.14.14.161: nepetalactol monooxygenase
- EC 1.14.14.162: flavanone 2-hydroxylase
- EC 1.14.14.163: (S)-1-hydroxy-N-methylcanadine 13-hydroxylase
- EC 1.14.14.164: fraxetin 5-hydroxylase
- EC 1.14.14.165: indole-3-carbonyl nitrile 4-hydroxylase
- EC 1.14.14.166: (S)-N-methylcanadine 1-hydroxylase
- EC 1.14.14.167: (13S,14R)-13-O-acetyl-1-hydroxy-N-methylcanadine 8-hydroxylase
- EC 1.14.14.168: germacrene A acid 8β-hydroxylase
- EC 1.14.14.169: eupatolide synthase
- EC 1.14.14.170: 8-epi-inunolide synthase
- EC 1.14.14.171: β-amyrin 16α-hydroxylase
- EC 1.14.14.172: 3,5,6-trichloropyridin-2-ol monooxygenase
- EC 1.14.14.173: 2,4,6-trichlorophenol monooxygenase
- EC 1.14.14.174: geranylhydroquinone 3′′-hydroxylase
- EC 1.14.14.175: ferruginol synthase
- EC 1.14.14.176: taxadiene 5α-hydroxylase
- EC 1.14.14.177: ultra-long-chain fatty acid ω-hydroxylase
- EC 1.14.14.182: taxoid 7beta-hydroxylase
- EC 1.14.14.197: progesterone 11alpha-monooxygenase

=== EC 1.14.15 With reduced iron–sulfur protein as one donor, and incorporation of one atom of oxygen ===
- EC 1.14.15.1: camphor 5-monooxygenase
- EC 1.14.15.2: Now EC 1.14.13.162, 2,5-diketocamphane 1,2-monooxygenase.
- EC 1.14.15.3: alkane 1-monooxygenase
- EC 1.14.15.4: steroid 11β-monooxygenase
- EC 1.14.15.5: corticosterone 18-monooxygenase
- EC 1.14.15.6: cholesterol monooxygenase (side-chain-cleaving)
- EC 1.14.15.7: choline monooxygenase
- EC 1.14.15.8: steroid 15β-monooxygenase
- EC 1.14.15.9: spheroidene monooxygenase
- EC 1.14.15.10: (+)-camphor 6-endo-hydroxylase
- EC 1.14.15.11: pentalenic acid synthase
- EC 1.14.15.12 : pimeloyl-[acyl-carrier protein] synthase. Now EC 1.14.14.46, pimeloyl-[acyl-carrier protein] synthase
- EC 1.14.15.13: pulcherriminic acid synthase
- EC 1.14.15.14: methyl-branched lipid ω-hydroxylase
- EC 1.14.15.15: cholestanetriol 26-monooxygenase
- EC 1.14.15.16: vitamin D_{3} 24-hydroxylase
- EC 1.14.15.17: pheophorbide a oxygenase
- EC 1.14.15.18: calcidiol 1-monooxygenase
- EC 1.14.15.19: C-19 steroid 1α-hydroxylase
- EC 1.14.15.20: heme oxygenase (biliverdin-producing, ferredoxin)
- EC 1.14.15.21: zeaxanthin epoxidase
- EC 1.14.15.22: vitamin D 1,25-hydroxylase
- EC 1.14.15.23: chloroacetanilide N-alkylformylase
- EC 1.14.15.24: β-carotene 3-hydroxylase
- EC 1.14.15.25: p-cymene methyl-monooxygenase
- EC 1.14.15.26: toluene methyl-monooxygenase
- EC 1.14.15.27: β-dihydromenaquinone-9 ω-hydroxylase
- EC 1.14.15.28: cholest-4-en-3-one 26-monooxygenase [(25R)-3-oxocholest-4-en-26-oate forming]
- EC 1.14.15.29: cholest-4-en-3-one 26-monooxygenase [(25S)-3-oxocholest-4-en-26-oate forming]
- EC 1.14.15.30: 3-ketosteroid 9α-monooxygenase
- EC 1.14.15.31: 2-hydroxy-5-methyl-1-naphthoate 7-hydroxylase
- EC 1.14.15.32: pentalenene oxygenase
- EC 1.14.15.33: pikromycin synthase
- EC 1.14.15.34: 20-oxo-5-O-mycaminosyltylactone 23-monooxygenase
- EC 1.14.15.35: 6-deoxyerythronolide B hydroxylase
- EC 1.14.15.36: sterol 14α-demethylase (ferredoxin)
- EC 1.14.15.37: luteothin monooxygenase
- EC 1.14.15.38: N,N-dimethyl phenylurea N-demethylase
- EC 1.14.15.39: epi-isozizaene 5-monooxygenase

=== EC 1.14.16 With reduced pteridine as one donor, and incorporation of one atom of oxygen into the other donor ===
- EC 1.14.16.1: phenylalanine 4-monooxygenase
- EC 1.14.16.2: tyrosine 3-monooxygenase
- EC 1.14.16.3: withdrawn owing to insufficient evidence (anthranilate 3-monooxygenase)
- EC 1.14.16.4: tryptophan 5-monooxygenase
- EC 1.14.16.5: alkylglycerol monooxygenase
- EC 1.14.16.6: mandelate 4-monooxygenase
- EC 1.14.16.7: phenylalanine 3-monooxygenase

=== EC 1.14.17 With reduced ascorbate as one donor, and incorporation of one atom of oxygen into the other donor ===
- EC 1.14.17.1: dopamine β-monooxygenase
- EC |1.14.17.2: deleted, now included with EC 1.14.18.1 monophenol monooxygenase
- EC 1.14.17.3: peptidylglycine monooxygenase
- EC 1.14.17.4: aminocyclopropanecarboxylate oxidase

=== EC 1.14.18 With another compound as one donor, and incorporation of one atom of oxygen into the other donor ===
- EC 1.14.18.1: tyrosinase
- EC 1.14.18.2: CMP-N-acetylneuraminate monooxygenase
- EC 1.14.18.3: methane monooxygenase (particulate)
- EC 1.14.18.4: phosphatidylcholine 12-monooxygenase
- EC 1.14.18.5: sphingolipid C4-monooxygenase
- EC 1.14.18.6: 4-hydroxysphinganine ceramide fatty acyl 2-hydroxylase
- EC 1.14.18.7: dihydroceramide fatty acyl 2-hydroxylase
- EC 1.14.18.8: Now included with EC 1.14.14.139, 5β-cholestane-3α,7α-diol 12α-hydroxylase
- EC 1.14.18.9: 4α-methylsterol monooxygenase
- EC 1.14.18.10: plant 4,4-dimethylsterol C-4α-methyl-monooxygenase
- EC 1.14.18.11: plant 4α-monomethylsterol monooxygenase
- EC 1.14.18.12: 2-hydroxy fatty acid dioxygenase

=== EC 1.14.19 With oxidation of a pair of donors resulting in the reduction of O_{2} to two molecules of water ===
- EC 1.14.19.1: stearoyl-CoA 9-desaturase
- EC 1.14.19.2: stearoyl-[acyl-carrier-protein] 9-desaturase
- EC 1.14.19.3: linoleoyl-CoA desaturase
- EC 1.14.19.4: acyl-lipid (11-3)-desaturase
- EC 1.14.19.5: acyl-CoA 11-(Z)-desaturase
- EC 1.14.19.6: acyl-CoA (9+3)-desaturase
- EC 1.14.19.7: Now EC 1.11.1.23, (S)-2-hydroxypropylphosphonic acid epoxidase
- EC 1.14.19.8: pentalenolactone synthase
- EC 1.14.19.9: tryptophan 7-halogenase
- EC 1.14.19.10: icosanoyl-CoA 5-desaturase
- EC 1.14.19.11: acyl-[acyl-carrier-protein] 4-desaturase
- EC 1.14.19.12: acyl-lipid ω-(9-4) desaturase
- EC 1.14.19.13: acyl-CoA 15-desaturase
- EC 1.14.19.14: linoleoyl-lipid Δ^{9} conjugase
- EC 1.14.19.15: (11Z)-hexadec-11-enoyl-CoA conjugase
- EC 1.14.19.16: linoleoyl-lipid Δ^{12} conjugase (11E,13Z-forming)
- EC 1.14.19.17: sphingolipid 4-desaturase
- EC 1.14.19.18: sphingolipid 8-(E)-desaturase
- EC 1.14.19.19: sphingolipid 10-desaturase
- EC 1.14.19.20: Δ^{7}-sterol 5(6)-desaturase
- EC 1.14.19.21: cholesterol 7-desaturase
- EC 1.14.19.22: acyl-lipid ω-6 desaturase (cytochrome b_{5})
- EC 1.14.19.23: acyl-lipid (n+3)-(Z)-desaturase (ferredoxin)
- EC 1.14.19.24: acyl-CoA 11-(E)-desaturase
- EC 1.14.19.25: acyl-lipid ω-3 desaturase (cytochrome b_{5})
- EC 1.14.19.26: acyl-[acyl-carrier-protein] 6-desaturase
- EC 1.14.19.27: sn-2 palmitoyl-lipid 9-desaturase
- EC 1.14.19.28: sn-1 stearoyl-lipid 9-desaturase
- EC 1.14.19.29: sphingolipid 8-(E/Z)-desaturase
- EC 1.14.19.30: acyl-lipid (8-3)-desaturase
- EC 1.14.19.31: acyl-lipid (7-3)-desaturase
- EC 1.14.19.32: palmitoyl-CoA 14-(E/Z)-desaturase
- EC 1.14.19.33: Δ^{12} acyl-lipid conjugase (11E,13E-forming)
- EC 1.14.19.34: acyl-lipid (9+3)-(E)-desaturase
- EC 1.14.19.35: sn-2 acyl-lipid ω-3 desaturase (ferredoxin)
- EC 1.14.19.36: sn-1 acyl-lipid ω-3 desaturase (ferredoxin)
- EC 1.14.19.37: acyl-CoA 5-desaturase
- EC 1.14.19.38: acyl-lipid Δ^{6}-acetylenase
- EC 1.14.19.39: acyl-lipid Δ^{12}-acetylenase
- EC 1.14.19.40: hex-5-enoyl-[acyl-carrier protein] acetylenase
- EC 1.14.19.41: sterol 22-desaturase
- EC 1.14.19.42: palmitoyl-[glycerolipid] 7-desaturase
- EC 1.14.19.43: palmitoyl-[glycerolipid] 3-(E)-desaturase
- EC 1.14.19.44: acyl-CoA (8-3)-desaturase
- EC 1.14.19.45: sn-1 oleoyl-lipid 12-desaturase
- EC 1.14.19.46: sn-1 linoleoyl-lipid 6-desaturase
- EC 1.14.19.47: acyl-lipid (9-3)-desaturase
- EC 1.14.19.48: tert-amyl alcohol desaturase
- EC 1.14.19.49: tetracycline 7-halogenase
- EC 1.14.19.50: noroxomaritidine synthase
- EC 1.14.19.51: (S)-corytuberine synthase
- EC 1.14.19.52: camalexin synthase
- EC 1.14.19.53: all-trans-retinol 3,4-desaturase
- EC 1.14.19.54: 1,2-dehydroreticuline synthase
- EC 1.14.19.55: 4-hydroxybenzoate brominase (decarboxylating)
- EC 1.14.19.56: 1H-pyrrole-2-carbonyl-[peptidyl-carrier protein] chlorinase
- EC 1.14.19.57: 1H-pyrrole-2-carbonyl-[peptidyl-carrier protein] brominase
- EC 1.14.19.58: tryptophan 5-halogenase
- EC 1.14.19.59: tryptophan 6-halogenase
- EC 1.14.19.60: 7-chloro-L-tryptophan 6-halogenase
- EC 1.14.19.61: dihydrorhizobitoxine desaturase
- EC 1.14.19.62: secologanin synthase
- EC 1.14.19.63: pseudobaptigenin synthase
- EC 1.14.19.64: (S)-stylopine synthase
- EC 1.14.19.65: (S)-cheilanthifoline synthase
- EC 1.14.19.66: berbamunine synthase
- EC 1.14.19.67: salutaridine synthase
- EC 1.14.19.68: (S)-canadine synthase
- EC 1.14.19.69: biflaviolin synthase
- EC 1.14.19.70: mycocyclosin synthase
- EC 1.14.19.71: fumitremorgin C synthase
- EC 1.14.19.72: (–)-pluviatolide synthase
- EC 1.14.19.73: (S)-nandinine synthase
- EC 1.14.19.74: (+)-piperitol/(+)-sesamin synthase
- EC 1.14.19.75: very-long-chain acyl-lipid ω-9 desaturase
- EC 1.14.19.76: flavone synthase II
- EC 1.14.19.77: plasmanylethanolamine desaturase
- EC 1.14.19.78: decanoyl-[acyl-carrier protein] acetylenase

=== EC 1.14.20 With 2-oxoglutarate as one donor, and the other dehydrogenated ===
- EC 1.14.20.1: deacetoxycephalosporin-C synthase
- EC 1.14.20.2: Now EC 1.14.11.59, 2,4-dihydroxy-1,4-benzoxazin-3-one-glucoside dioxygenase
- EC 1.14.20.3: (5R)-carbapenem-3-carboxylate synthase
- EC 1.14.20.4: anthocyanidin synthase
- EC 1.14.20.5: flavone synthase I
- EC 1.14.20.6: flavonol synthase
- EC 1.14.20.7: 2-oxoglutarate/L-arginine monooxygenase/decarboxylase (succinate-forming)
- EC 1.14.20.8: (–)-deoxypodophyllotoxin synthase
- EC 1.14.20.9: L-tyrosine isonitrile desaturase
- EC 1.14.20.10: L-tyrosine isonitrile desaturase/decarboxylase
- EC 1.14.20.11: 3-[(Z)-2-isocyanoethenyl]-1H-indole synthase
- EC 1.14.20.12: 3-[(E)-2-isocyanoethenyl]-1H-indole synthase
- EC 1.14.20.13: 6β-hydroxyhyoscyamine epoxidase
- EC 1.14.20.14: hapalindole-type alkaloid chlorinase
- EC 1.14.20.15: L-threonyl-[L-threonyl-carrier protein] 4-chlorinase

=== EC 1.14.21 With NADH or NADPH as one donor, and the other dehydrogenated ===
- EC 1.14.21.1: Now EC 1.14.19.64, (S)-stylopine synthase
- EC 1.14.21.2: Now EC 1.14.19.65, (S)-cheilanthifoline synthase
- EC 1.14.21.3: Now EC 1.14.19.66, berbamunine synthase
- EC 1.14.21.4: Now EC 1.14.19.67, salutaridine synthase
- EC 1.14.21.5: Now EC 1.14.19.68, (S)-canadine synthase
- EC 1.14.21.6: Now EC 1.14.19.20, Δ^{7}-sterol 5(6)-desaturase
- EC 1.14.21.7: Now EC 1.14.19.69, biflaviolin synthase
- EC 1.14.21.8: Now EC 1.14.19.63, pseudobaptigenin synthase
- EC 1.14.21.9: Now EC 1.14.19.70, mycocyclosin synthase *
- EC 1.14.21.10: Now EC 1.14.19.71, fumitremorgin C synthase *
- EC 1.14.21.11: Now EC 1.14.19.72, (–)-pluviatolide synthase *
- EC 1.14.21.12: Now EC 1.14.19.73, (S)-nandinine synthase *

=== EC 1.14.99 Miscellaneous ===
- EC 1.14.99.1: prostaglandin-endoperoxide synthase
- EC 1.14.99.2: kynurenine 7,8-hydroxylase
- EC 1.14.99.3: Now EC 1.14.14.18, heme oxygenase (biliverdin-producing)
- EC 1.14.99.4: progesterone monooxygenase
- EC 1.14.99.5: Now EC 1.14.19.1, stearoyl-CoA 9-desaturase
- EC 1.14.99.6: Now EC 1.14.19.2, acyl-[acyl-carrier-protein] desaturase
- EC 1.14.99.7: Transferred to EC 1.14.13.132, squalene monooxygenase
- EC 1.14.99.8: Now included with EC 1.14.14.1 unspecific monooxygenase
- EC 1.14.99.9: Now classified as EC 1.14.14.19, steroid 17α-monooxygenase
- EC 1.14.99.10: Now EC 1.14.14.16, steroid 21-monooxygenase
- EC 1.14.99.11: estradiol 6β-monooxygenase
- EC 1.14.99.12: 4-androstene-3,17-dione monooxygenase
- EC 1.14.99.13: Now EC 1.14.13.23, 3-hydroxybenzoate 4-monooxygenase
- EC 1.14.99.14: Now EC 1.14.14.197, progesterone 11α-monooxygenase
- EC 1.14.99.15: 4-methoxybenzoate monooxygenase (O-demethylating)
- EC 1.14.99.16: Now EC 1.14.13.72, methylsterol monooxygenase
- EC 1.14.99.17: Now EC 1.14.16.5, glyceryl-ether monooxygenase
- EC 1.14.99.18: deleted
- EC 1.14.99.19: Now classified as EC 1.14.19.77, plasmanylethanolamine desaturase
- EC 1.14.99.20: phylloquinone monooxygenase (2,3-epoxidizing)
- EC 1.14.99.21: Latia-luciferin monooxygenase (demethylating)
- EC 1.14.99.22: ecdysone 20-monooxygenase
- EC 1.14.99.23: 3-hydroxybenzoate 2-monooxygenase
- EC 1.14.99.24: steroid 9α-monooxygenase
- EC 1.14.99.25: Now EC 1.14.19.3, linoleoyl-CoA desaturase
- EC 1.14.99.26: 2-hydroxypyridine 5-monooxygenase
- EC 1.14.99.27: Now classified as EC 1.17.3.4, juglone 3-monooxygenase
- EC 1.14.99.28: Now EC 1.14.14.84, linalool 8-monooxygenase
- EC 1.14.99.29: deoxyhypusine monooxygenase
- EC 1.14.99.30: Now EC 1.3.5.6, 9,9′-dicis-ζ-carotene desaturase.
- EC 1.14.99.31: Now classified as EC 1.14.19.24, myristoyl-CoA 11-(E) desaturase
- EC 1.14.99.32: Now classified as EC 1.14.19.5, acyl-CoA 11-(Z)-desaturase
- EC 1.14.99.33: Now EC 1.14.19.39, acyl-lipid Δ^{12}-acetylenase
- EC 1.14.99.34: monoprenyl isoflavone epoxidase
- EC 1.14.99.35: thiophene-2-carbonyl-CoA monooxygenase
- EC 1.14.99.36: Now classified as EC 1.13.11.63, β-carotene 15,15′-dioxygenase
- EC 1.14.99.37: Now EC 1.14.14.176, taxadiene 5α-hydroxylase
- EC 1.14.99.38: cholesterol 25-hydroxylase
- EC 1.14.99.39: ammonia monooxygenase
- EC 1.14.99.40: Now EC 1.13.11.79, 5,6-dimethylbenzimidazole synthase
- EC 1.14.99.41: Now EC 1.13.11.75, all-trans-8′-apo-β-carotenal 15,15′-oxygenase
- EC 1.14.99.42: Now EC 1.13.11.84, crocetin dialdehyde synthase
- EC 1.14.99.43: Now EC 1.14.14.134, β-amyrin 24-hydroxylase
- EC 1.14.99.44: diapolycopene oxygenase
- EC 1.14.99.45: Now EC 1.14.14.158, carotene ε-monooxygenase
- EC 1.14.99.46: pyrimidine oxygenase
- EC 1.14.99.47: (+)-larreatricin hydroxylase
- EC 1.14.99.48: heme oxygenase (staphylobilin-producing)
- EC 1.14.99.49: Now EC 1.14.15.31, 2-hydroxy-5-methyl-1-naphthoate 7-hydroxylase
- EC 1.14.99.50: γ-glutamyl hercynylcysteine S-oxide synthase
- EC 1.14.99.51: hercynylcysteine S-oxide synthase
- EC 1.14.99.52: L-cysteinyl-L-histidinylsulfoxide synthase
- EC 1.14.99.53: lytic chitin monooxygenase
- EC 1.14.99.54: lytic cellulose monooxygenase (C1-hydroxylating)
- EC 1.14.99.55: lytic starch monooxygenase
- EC 1.14.99.56: lytic cellulose monooxygenase (C4-dehydrogenating)
- EC 1.14.99.57: heme oxygenase (mycobilin-producing)
- EC 1.14.99.58: heme oxygenase (biliverdin-IX-β and δ-forming)
- EC 1.14.99.59: tryptamine 4-monooxygenase
- EC 1.14.99.60: 3-demethoxyubiquinol 3-hydroxylase
- EC 1.14.99.61: cyclooctat-9-en-7-ol 5-monooxygenase
- EC 1.14.99.62: cyclooctatin synthase
- EC 1.14.99.63: β-carotene 4-ketolase
- EC 1.14.99.64: zeaxanthin 4-ketolase
- EC 1.14.99.65: 4-amino-L-phenylalanyl-[CmlP-peptidyl-carrier-protein] 3-hydroxylase
- EC 1.14.99.66: [histone H3]-N^{6},N^{6}-dimethyl-L-lysine^{4} FAD-dependent demethylase
- EC 1.14.99.67: α-N-dichloroacetyl-p-aminophenylserinol N-oxygenase
- EC 1.14.99.68: 4-aminobenzoate N-oxygenase
- EC 1.14.99.69: tRNA 2-(methylsulfanyl)-N^{6}-isopentenyladenosine^{37} hydroxylase

== EC 1.15 Acting on superoxide as acceptor ==
=== EC 1.15.1 ===
- EC 1.15.1.1: superoxide dismutase
- EC 1.15.1.2: superoxide reductase

== EC 1.16 Oxidizing metal ions ==
=== EC 1.16.1 With NAD^{+} or NADP^{+} as acceptor ===
- EC 1.16.1.1: mercury(II) reductase
- EC 1.16.1.2: diferric-transferrin reductase
- EC 1.16.1.3: deleted since no specific enzyme catalysing this activity has been identified
- EC 1.16.1.4: cob(II)alamin reductase
- EC 1.16.1.5: deleted since the enzyme the entry was based on was later shown to be EC 1.2.1.51, pyruvate dehydrogenase (NADP^{+}).
- EC 1.16.1.6: cyanocobalamin reductase (cyanide-eliminating)
- EC 1.16.1.7: ferric-chelate reductase
- EC 1.16.1.8: [methionine synthase] reductase
- EC 1.16.1.9: ferric-chelate reductase (NADPH)
- EC 1.16.1.10: ferric-chelate reductase [NAD(P)H]

=== EC 1.16.3 With oxygen as acceptor ===
- EC 1.16.3.1: ferroxidase
- EC 1.16.3.2: bacterial non-heme ferritin
- EC 1.16.3.3: manganese oxidase

=== EC 1.16.5 With a quinone or similar compound as acceptor ===
- EC 1.16.5.1: Now EC 7.2.1.3, ascorbate ferrireductase (transmembrane)

=== EC 1.16.8 With a flavin as acceptor ===
- EC 1.16.8.1: activity now known to be catalyzed by EC 2.5.1.17, corrinoid adenosyltransferase

=== EC 1.16.9 With a copper protein as acceptor ===
- EC 1.16.9.1: iron:rusticyanin reductase

=== EC 1.16.98 With other, known, physiological acceptors ===
- EC 1.16.98.1: Now EC 1.16.9.1 iron:rusticyanin reductase

=== EC 1.16.99 With unknown physiological acceptors ===
- EC 1.16.99.1: [Co(II) methylated amine-specific corrinoid protein] reductase

== EC 1.17 Acting on CH or CH_{2} groups ==
=== EC 1.17.1 With NAD or NADP as acceptor ===
- EC 1.17.1.1: CDP-4-dehydro-6-deoxyglucose reductase
- EC 1.17.1.2: now classified as EC 1.17.7.4, 4-hydroxy-3-methylbut-2-enyl diphosphate reductase
- EC 1.17.1.3: leucoanthocyanidin reductase
- EC 1.17.1.4: xanthine dehydrogenase
- EC 1.17.1.5: nicotinate dehydrogenase
- EC 1.17.1.6: Now EC 1.17.99.5, bile-acid 7α-dehydroxylase. It is now known that FAD is the acceptor and not NAD^{+} as was thought previously
- EC 1.17.1.7: Now EC 1.2.1.91, 3-oxo-5,6-dehydrosuberyl-CoA semialdehyde dehydrogenase
- EC 1.17.1.8: 4-hydroxy-tetrahydrodipicolinate reductase
- EC 1.17.1.9: formate dehydrogenase
- EC 1.17.1.10: formate dehydrogenase (NADP^{+})
- EC 1.17.1.11: formate dehydrogenase (NAD^{+}, ferredoxin)

=== EC 1.17.2 With a cytochrome as acceptor ===
- EC 1.17.2.1: nicotinate dehydrogenase (cytochrome)
- EC 1.17.2.2: lupanine 17-hydroxylase (cytochrome c)
- EC 1.17.2.3: formate dehydrogenase (cytochrome-c-553)

=== EC 1.17.3 With oxygen as acceptor ===
- EC 1.17.3.1: pteridine oxidase
- EC 1.17.3.2: xanthine oxidase
- EC 1.17.3.3: 6-hydroxynicotinate dehydrogenase
- EC 1.17.3.4: juglone 3-hydroxylase

=== EC 1.17.4 With a disulfide as acceptor ===
- EC 1.17.4.1: ribonucleoside-diphosphate reductase
- EC 1.17.4.2: ribonucleoside-triphosphate reductase (thioredoxin)
- EC 1.17.4.3: transferred to EC 1.17.7.1, (E)-4-hydroxy-3-methylbut-2-enyl-diphosphate synthase.
- EC 1.17.4.4: vitamin-K-epoxide reductase (warfarin-sensitive)
- EC 1.17.4.5: vitamin-K-epoxide reductase (warfarin-insensitive)

=== EC 1.17.5 With a quinone or similar compound as acceptor ===
- EC 1.17.5.1: phenylacetyl-CoA dehydrogenase
- EC 1.17.5.2: caffeine dehydrogenase
- EC 1.17.5.3: formate dehydrogenase-N

=== EC 1.17.7 With an iron–sulfur protein as acceptor ===
- EC 1.17.7.1: (E)-4-hydroxy-3-methylbut-2-enyl-diphosphate synthase (ferredoxin)
- EC 1.17.7.2: 7-hydroxymethyl chlorophyll a reductase
- EC 1.17.7.3: (E)-4-hydroxy-3-methylbut-2-enyl-diphosphate synthase (flavodoxin)
- EC 1.17.7.4: 4-hydroxy-3-methylbut-2-enyl diphosphate reductase

=== EC 1.17.98 With other, known, physiological acceptors ===
- EC 1.17.98.1: bile-acid 7α-dehydroxylase. Now known to be catalyzed by multiple enzymes.
- EC 1.17.98.2: bacteriochlorophyllide c C-7^{1}-hydroxylase
- EC 1.17.98.3: formate dehydrogenase (coenzyme F_{420})
- EC 1.17.98.4: formate dehydrogenase (hydrogenase)

=== EC 1.17.99 With unknown physiological acceptors ===
- EC 1.17.99.1: Now EC 1.17.9.1, 4-methylphenol dehydrogenase (hydroxylating)
- EC 1.17.99.2: ethylbenzene hydroxylase
- EC 1.17.99.3: 3α,7α,12α-trihydroxy-5β-cholestanoyl-CoA 24-hydroxylase
- EC 1.17.99.4: uracil/thymine dehydrogenase
- EC 1.17.99.5: Now classified as EC 1.17.98.1, bile-acid 7α-dehydroxylase
- EC 1.17.99.6: epoxyqueuosine reductase
- EC 1.17.99.7: Now classified as EC 1.17.98.4, formate dehydrogenase (hydrogenase)
- EC 1.17.99.8: limonene dehydrogenase
- EC 1.17.99.9: heme a synthase
- EC 1.17.99.10: steroid C-25 hydroxylase
- EC 1.17.99.11: 3-oxo-Δ^{1}-steroid hydratase/dehydrogenase

== EC 1.18 Acting on iron–sulfur proteins as donors ==
=== EC 1.18.1 With NAD^{+} or NADP^{+} as acceptor ===
- EC 1.18.1.1: rubredoxin—NAD^{+} reductase
- EC 1.18.1.2: ferredoxin—NADP^{+} reductase
- EC 1.18.1.3: ferredoxin—NAD^{+} reductase
- EC 1.18.1.4: rubredoxin—NAD(P)^{+} reductase
- EC 1.18.1.5: Putidaredoxin—NAD^{+} reductase
- EC 1.18.1.6: adrenodoxin-NADP^{+} reductase
- EC 1.18.1.7: ferredoxin—NAD(P)^{+} reductase (naphthalene dioxygenase ferredoxin-specific)
- EC 1.18.1.8: Now EC 7.2.1.2, ferredoxin—NAD^{+} oxidoreductase (Na^{+}-transporting)

=== EC 1.18.2 With dinitrogen as acceptor (deleted sub-subclass) ===
- EC 1.18.2.1: now EC 1.18.6.1, nitrogenase

=== EC 1.18.3 With H^{+} as acceptor (deleted sub-subclass) ===
- EC 1.18.3.1: Now EC 1.12.7.2, ferredoxin hydrogenase

=== EC 1.18.6 With dinitrogen as acceptor ===
- EC 1.18.6.1: nitrogenase
- EC 1.18.6.2: vanadium-dependent nitrogenase

=== EC 1.18.96 With other, known, acceptors (deleted sub-subclass) ===
- EC 1.18.96.1: Now EC 1.15.1.2, superoxide reductase

=== EC 1.18.99 With H^{+} as acceptor (deleted sub-subclass) ===
- EC 1.18.99.1: Now EC 1.12.7.2, ferredoxin hydrogenase

== EC 1.19 Acting on reduced flavodoxin as donor ==
=== EC 1.19.1 With NAD^{+} or NADP^{+} as acceptor ===
- EC 1.19.1.1: flavodoxin—NADP^{+} reductase

=== EC 1.19.6 With dinitrogen as acceptor ===
- EC 1.19.6.1: nitrogenase (flavodoxin)

== EC 1.20 Acting on phosphorus or arsenic in donors ==
=== EC 1.20.1 Acting on phosphorus or arsenic in donors, with NAD^{+} as acceptor ===
- EC 1.20.1.1: phosphonate dehydrogenase

=== EC 1.20.2 Acting on phosphorus or arsenic in donors, with NAD(P)^{+} as acceptor ===
- EC 1.20.2.1: arsenate reductase (cytochrome c)

=== EC 1.20.4 Acting on phosphorus or arsenic in donors, with disulfide as acceptor ===
- EC 1.20.4.1: arsenate reductase (glutaredoxin)
- EC 1.20.4.2: methylarsonate reductase
- EC 1.20.4.3: mycoredoxin
- EC 1.20.4.4: arsenate reductase (thioredoxin)

=== EC 1.20.9 With a copper protein as acceptor ===
- EC 1.20.9.1: arsenate reductase (azurin)

=== EC 1.20.98 With other, known acceptors ===
- EC 1.20.98.1: Now EC 1.20.9.1, arsenate reductase (azurin)

=== EC 1.20.99 With unknown physiological acceptors ===
- EC 1.20.99.1: arsenate reductase (donor)

== EC 1.21 Catalysing the reaction X-H + Y-H = X-Y ==
=== EC 1.21.3 With oxygen as acceptor ===
- EC 1.21.3.1: isopenicillin-N synthase
- EC 1.21.3.2: columbamine oxidase
- EC 1.21.3.3: reticuline oxidase
- EC 1.21.3.4: sulochrin oxidase ((+)-bisdechlorogeodin-forming)
- EC 1.21.3.5: sulochrin oxidase ((-)-bisdechlorogeodin-forming)
- EC 1.21.3.6: aureusidin synthase
- EC 1.21.3.7: tetrahydrocannabinolic acid synthase
- EC 1.21.3.8: cannabidiolic acid synthase
- EC 1.21.3.9: now classified as EC 1.21.98.2, dichlorochromopyrrolate synthase

=== EC 1.21.4 With a disulfide as acceptor ===
- EC 1.21.4.1: D-proline reductase (dithiol)
- EC 1.21.4.2: glycine reductase
- EC 1.21.4.3: sarcosine reductase
- EC 1.21.4.4: betaine reductase
- EC 1.21.4.5: tetrachlorohydroquinone reductive dehalogenase

=== EC 1.21.98 With other, known, physiological acceptors ===
- EC 1.21.98.1: cyclic dehypoxanthinyl futalosine synthase
- EC 1.21.98.2: dichlorochromopyrrolate synthase
- EC 1.21.98.3: anaerobic magnesium-protoporphyrin IX monomethyl ester cyclase
- EC 1.21.98.4: PqqA peptide cyclase

=== EC 1.21.99 With unknown physiological acceptors ===
- EC 1.21.99.1 EC 1.21.99.1: β-cyclopiazonate dehydrogenase
- EC 1.21.99.2: Now classified as EC 1.21.98.1, cyclic dehypoxanthinyl futalosine synthase.
- EC 1.21.99.3: thyroxine 5-deiodinase
- EC 1.21.99.4: thyroxine 5′-deiodinase
- EC 1.21.99.5: tetrachloroethene reductive dehalogenase

== EC 1.22 Acting on halogen in donors ==
=== EC 1.22.1 With NAD^{+} or NADP^{+} as acceptor ===
- EC 1.22.1.1: Now EC 1.21.1.1, iodotyrosine deiodinase

== EC 1.23 Reducing C-O-C group as acceptor ==
=== EC 1.23.1 With NADH or NADPH as donor ===
- EC 1.23.1.1: (+)-Pinoresinol reductasa
- EC 1.23.1.2: (+)-lariciresinol reductase
- EC 1.23.1.3: (–)-pinoresinol reductase
- EC 1.23.1.4: (–)-lariciresinol reductase

== EC 1.97 Other oxidoreductases ==
=== EC 1.97.1 Sole sub-subclass for oxidoreductases that do not belong in the other subclasses ===
- EC 1.97.1.1: chlorate reductase
- EC 1.97.1.2: Now EC 5.4.4.9, pyrogallol hydroxytransferase
- EC 1.97.1.3: Now EC 1.12.98.4, sulfhydrogenase, since hydrogen is known to be the electron donor
- EC 1.97.1.4: [formate-C-acetyltransferase]-activating enzyme
- EC 1.97.1.5: Now EC 1.20.4.1, arsenate reductase (glutaredoxin
- EC 1.97.1.6: Now EC 1.20.99.1, arsenate reductase (donor)
- EC 1.97.1.7: Now EC 1.20.4.2, methylarsonate reductase
- EC 1.97.1.8: Now EC 1.21.99.5, tetrachloroethene reductive dehalogenase
- EC 1.97.1.9: selenate reductase
- EC 1.97.1.10: Now EC 1.21.99.4 thyroxine 5′-deiodinase
- EC 1.97.1.11: Now EC 1.21.99.3 thyroxine 5-deiodinase.
- EC 1.97.1.12: photosystem I

=== EC 1.98 Enzymes using H_{2} as reductant (deleted subclass) ===
EC 1.98.1.1: Now EC 1.12.7.2, ferredoxin hydrogenase

== EC 1.99 Other enzymes using O_{2} as oxidant ==
=== EC 1.99.1 Hydroxylases (now covered by EC 1.14) ===
- EC 1.99.1.1: deleted, Now EC 1.12.7.2, ferredoxin hydrogenase
- EC 1.99.1.2: deleted, Now EC 1.14.16.1, phenylalanine 4-monooxygenase
- EC 1.99.1.3: deleted, nicotinate 6-hydroxylase
- EC 1.99.1.4: deleted, tryptophan 5-hydroxylase
- EC 1.99.1.5: deleted, Now EC 1.14.13.9, kynurenine 3-monooxygenase
- EC 1.99.1.6: deleted, steroid 11α-hydroxylase
- EC 1.99.1.7: deleted, Now EC 1.14.15.4, steroid 11β-monooxygenase
- EC 1.99.1.8: deleted, steroid 6β-hydroxylase
- EC 1.99.1.9: deleted, Now EC 1.14.99.9, steroid 17α-monooxygenase
- EC 1.99.1.10: deleted, steroid 19-hydroxylase
- EC 1.99.1.11: deleted, Now EC 1.14.99.10, steroid 21-monooxygenase
- EC 1.99.1.12: deleted, alkoxyaryl hydroxylase
- EC 1.99.1.13: deleted, covered by EC 1.14.99.7 (squalene monooxygenase) and by EC 5.4.99.7 (lanosterol synthase)
- EC 1.99.1.14: deleted, Now EC 1.13.11.27, 4-hydroxyphenylpyruvate dioxygenase

=== EC 1.99.2 Oxygenases (now covered by EC 1.13) ===
- EC 1.99.2.1: deleted, now EC 1.13.11.12, lipoxygenase
- EC 1.99.2.2: deleted, now EC 1.13.11.1, catechol 1,2-dioxygenase
- EC 1.99.2.3: deleted, now EC 1.13.11.3, protocatechuate 3,4-dioxygenase
- EC 1.99.2.4: deleted, now EC 1.13.11.4, gentisate 1,2-dioxygenase
- EC 1.99.2.5: deleted, now EC 1.13.11.5, homogentisate 1,2-dioxygenase
- EC 1.99.2.6: deleted, now EC 1.13.99.1, inositol oxygenase
