= C6H10O2 =

The molecular formula C_{6}H_{10}O_{2} may refer to:

- Adipaldehyde
- Allyl glycidyl ether
- Caprolactone
- Cyclopentanecarboxylic acid
- Ethyl methacrylate
- Hexane-2,5-dione
- (2R)-2-Methylpent-4-enoic acid
