= C5H8O4 =

The molecular formula C_{5}H_{8}O_{4} may refer to:

- Acetolactic acid
- 4,5-Dihydroxy-2,3-pentanedione
- Dimethyl malonate
- Glutaric acid
- 4-Hydroxy-2-oxopentanoic acid
- 2-Methylsuccinic acid
- Xylosan
