= 2-Hydroxymuconate-6-semialdehyde dehydrogenase =

Class of enzymes

Identifiers
- EC no.: 1.2.1.85

Databases
- IntEnz: IntEnz view
- BRENDA: BRENDA entry
- ExPASy: NiceZyme view
- KEGG: KEGG entry
- MetaCyc: metabolic pathway
- PRIAM: profile
- PDB structures: RCSB PDB PDBe PDBsum
Search
- PMC: articles
- PubMed: articles
- NCBI: proteins

2-Hydroxymuconate-6-semialdehyde dehydrogenase (EC 1.2.1.85, xylG [gene], praB [gene] ) is an enzyme with systematic name (2E,4Z)-2-hydroxy-6-oxohexa-2,4-dienoate:NAD^{+} oxidoreductase. This enzyme catalyses the following chemical reaction

2E,4Z)-2-hydroxy-6-oxohexa-2,4-dienoic acid
+ NAD^{+}
H_{2}O
H^{+}
H_{2}O
H^{+}
(2E,4Z)-2-hydroxymuconic acid
+ NADH

This substrate for this enzyme is formed by meta ring cleavage of catechol (EC 1.13.11.2, catechol 2,3-dioxygenase), and is an intermediate in the bacterial degradation of several aromatic compounds.
