= 2,6-dioxo-6-phenylhexa-3-enoate hydrolase =

Class of enzymes

Identifiers
- EC no.: 3.7.1.8
- CAS no.: 102925-38-2

Databases
- IntEnz: IntEnz view
- BRENDA: BRENDA entry
- ExPASy: NiceZyme view
- KEGG: KEGG entry
- MetaCyc: metabolic pathway
- PRIAM: profile
- PDB structures: RCSB PDB PDBe PDBsum
- Gene Ontology: AmiGO / QuickGO
Search
- PMC: articles
- PubMed: articles
- NCBI: proteins

In enzymology, a 2,6-dioxo-6-phenylhexa-3-enoate hydrolase (EC 3.7.1.8) is an enzyme that catalyzes the chemical reaction

2,6-dioxo-6-phenylhexa-3-enoate + H_{2}O $\rightleftharpoons$ benzoate + 2-oxopent-4-enoate

Thus, the two substrates of this enzyme are 2,6-dioxo-6-phenylhexa-3-enoate and H_{2}O, whereas its two products are benzoate and 2-oxopent-4-enoate.

This enzyme belongs to the family of hydrolases, specifically those acting on carbon-carbon bonds in ketonic substances. The systematic name of this enzyme class is 2,6-dioxo-6-phenylhexa-3-enoate benzoylhydrolase. This enzyme is also called HOHPDA hydrolase. This enzyme participates in biphenyl degradation and fluorene degradation.

== Structural studies ==
As of late 2007, 3 structures have been solved for this class of enzymes, with PDB accession codes 1C4X, 1J1I, and 2OG1.
