= HMSH =

HMSH may refer to:

- 2-hydroxymuconate-semialdehyde hydrolase, an enzyme that catalyzes the chemical reaction
- His/Her Most Serene Highness, a form of royal address
- Hanns-Martin-Schleyer-Halle, an indoor arena in Stuttgart, Germany
- Human Mut-S-Homologon
