= Amne =

Amne may refer to:

- 4-oxalocrotonate decarboxylase, an enzyme
- Amné, a commune in north-western France
- Amne Machin, a mountain peak in China
- Amne, Inc., a US-based real estate technology company founded in 2016
