= 2-Hydroxymuconate semialdehyde =

Names
- Preferred IUPAC name (2Z,4E)-2-Hydroxy-6-oxohexa-2,4-dienoic acid
- Other names hydroxymuconic semialdehyde; 2-hydroxymuconate semialdehyde; 2-hydroxymuconate-6-semialdehyde

Identifiers
CAS Number	3270-98-2
3D model (JSmol)	Interactive image
ChemSpider	28533124
PubChem CID	5280366
UNII	H89BYZ9XEQ
- InChI: InChI=1S/C6H6O4/c7-4-2-1-3-5(8)6(9)10/h1-4,8H,(H,9,10)/b2-1-,5-3+ Key: KGLCZTRXNNGESL-REDYYMJGSA-N
- SMILES: O=C/C=C\C=C(\O)C(=O)O

Properties
Chemical formula	C_{6}H_{6}O_{4}
Molar mass	142.110 g·mol^{−1}
- Except where otherwise noted, data are given for materials in their standard state (at 25 °C [77 °F], 100 kPa). Infobox references

2-Hydroxymuconate semialdehyde is formed from catechol by the enzyme catechol 2,3-dioxygenase during the degradation of benzoates.

catechol
O_{2}
O_{2}
2-hydroxymuconate semialdehyde

It is oxidised to (2E,4Z)-2-hydroxymuconic acid] by the enzyme 2-hydroxymuconate-6-semialdehyde dehydrogenase.

2-hydroxymuconate semialdehyde
+ NAD^{+}
H_{2}O
H^{+}
H_{2}O
H^{+}
(2E,4Z)-2-hydroxymuconic acid
+ NADH

It is also degraded into formate and 2-oxopent-4-enoic acid by 2-hydroxymuconate-semialdehyde hydrolase.

2-hydroxymuconate semialdehyde
H_{2}O
HCO_{2}H
H_{2}O
HCO_{2}H
2-oxopent-4-enoic acid
