= 2-Oxopent-4-enoic acid =

Names
- Preferred IUPAC name 2-Oxopent-4-enoic acid
- Other names 2-Keto-4-pentenoic acid

Identifiers
CAS Number	20406-62-6
3D model (JSmol)	Interactive image
Beilstein Reference	1851398
ChEBI	CHEBI:37318
ChemSpider	951
PubChem CID	976
UNII	WW9JA557NY
CompTox Dashboard (EPA)	DTXSID20174358
- InChI: InChI=1S/C5H6O3/c1-2-3-4(6)5(7)8/h2H,1,3H2,(H,7,8) Key: NOXRYJAWRSNUJD-UHFFFAOYSA-N; InChI=1/C5H6O3/c1-2-3-4(6)5(7)8/h2H,1,3H2,(H,7,8) Key: NOXRYJAWRSNUJD-UHFFFAOYAP
- SMILES: O=C(C(=O)O)C\C=C

Properties
Chemical formula	C_{5}H_{6}O_{3}
Molar mass	114.100 g·mol^{−1}

Related compounds
Related compounds	Pentenoic acid; 4-Hydroxy-3-pentenoic acid; 2-Amino-5-chloro-4-pentenoic acid; (2R)-2-Methylpent-4-enoic acid
- Except where otherwise noted, data are given for materials in their standard state (at 25 °C [77 °F], 100 kPa). Infobox references

2-Oxopent-4-enoic acid (2-oxopent-4-enoate) is formed by the dehydration of 4-hydroxy-2-oxopentanoate by 2-oxopent-4-enoate hydratase or by the hydrolysis of 2-hydroxymuconate semialdehyde by 2-hydroxymuconate-semialdehyde hydrolase.

2-Hydroxymuconate semialdehyde
H_{2}O
HCO_{2}H
H_{2}O
HCO_{2}H
2-Oxopent-4-enoic acid
