= 2-oxopent-4-enoate hydratase =

InterPro Family

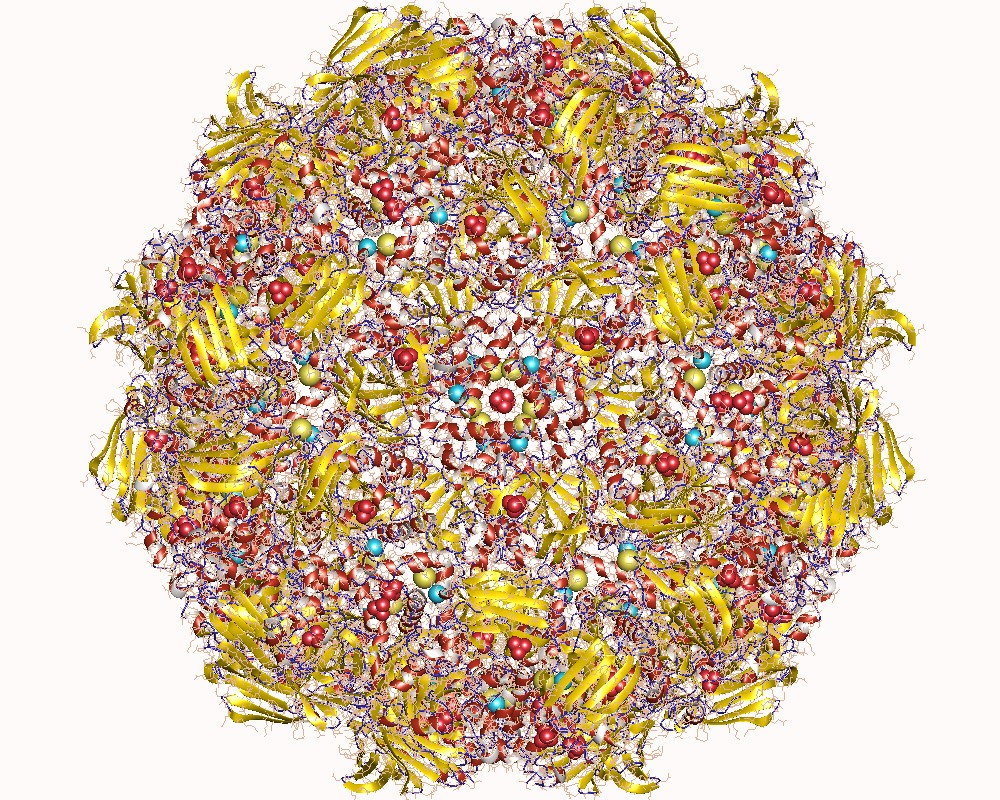
- 2-Oxopent-4-enoate hydratase homo60mer, E.Coli

Identifiers
- EC no.: 4.2.1.80
- CAS no.: 64427-80-1

Databases
- IntEnz: IntEnz view
- BRENDA: BRENDA entry
- ExPASy: NiceZyme view
- KEGG: KEGG entry
- MetaCyc: metabolic pathway
- PRIAM: profile
- PDB structures: RCSB PDB PDBe PDBsum
- Gene Ontology: AmiGO / QuickGO
Search
- PMC: articles
- PubMed: articles
- NCBI: proteins

The enzyme 2-oxopent-4-enoate hydratase (EC 4.2.1.80) catalyzes the chemical reaction:

2-Oxopent-4-enoic acid
H_{2}O
H_{2}O
4-Hydroxy-2-oxopentanoic acid

This enzyme belongs to the family of lyases, specifically the hydro-lyases, which cleave carbon-oxygen bonds. The systematic name of this enzyme class is 4-hydroxy-2-oxopentanoate hydro-lyase (2-oxopent-4-enoate-forming). Other names in common use include 2-keto-4-pentenoate hydratase, OEH, 2-keto-4-pentenoate (vinylpyruvate)hydratase, and 4-hydroxy-2-oxopentanoate hydro-lyase. This enzyme participates in nine metabolic pathways: phenylalanine metabolism, benzoate degradation via hydroxylation, biphenyl degradation, toluene and xylene degradation, 1,4-dichlorobenzene degradation, fluorene degradation, carbazole degradation, ethylbenzene degradation, and styrene degradation.
