= 4-Hydroxy-2-oxopentanoic acid =

Names
- Preferred IUPAC name 4-Hydroxy-2-oxopentanoic acid
- Other names 4-Hydroxy-2-ketopentanoic acid; 4-Hydroxy-2-ketovaleric acid; 4-Hydroxy-2-oxovaleric acid; 4-Hydroxy-2-oxopentanoate; 4-Hydroxy-2-ketopentanoate; 4-Hydroxy-2-ketovalerate; 4-Hydroxy-2-oxovalerate; HKP

Identifiers
CAS Number	3318-73-8
3D model (JSmol)	Interactive image
ChEBI	CHEBI:17655
ChemSpider	121
KEGG	C03589
PubChem CID	124
UNII	Q7M6F8F7B9
CompTox Dashboard (EPA)	DTXSID50954802
- InChI: InChI=1S/C5H8O4/c1-3(6)2-4(7)5(8)9/h3,6H,2H2,1H3,(H,8,9) Key: HFKQINMYQUXOCH-UHFFFAOYSA-N; InChI=1/C5H8O4/c1-3(6)2-4(7)5(8)9/h3,6H,2H2,1H3,(H,8,9) Key: HFKQINMYQUXOCH-UHFFFAOYAC
- SMILES: O=C(O)C(=O)CC(O)C

Properties
Chemical formula	C_{5}H_{8}O_{4}
Molar mass	132.115 g·mol^{−1}
- Except where otherwise noted, data are given for materials in their standard state (at 25 °C [77 °F], 100 kPa). Infobox references

4-Hydroxy-2-oxopentanoaic acid, also known as 4-hydroxy-2-oxovalerate, is formed by the decarboxylation of 4-oxalocrotonate by 4-oxalocrotonate decarboxylase, is degraded by 4-hydroxy-2-oxovalerate aldolase, forming acetaldehyde and pyruvate and is reversibly dehydrated by 2-oxopent-4-enoate hydratase to 2-oxopent-4-enoate.
