= Pentenoic acid =

Group of chemical compounds C5H8O2

Pentenoic acid is any of five mono-carboxylic acids whose molecule has an unbranched chain of five carbons connected by three single bonds and one double bond. That is, any compound with one of the formulas HO(O=)C−CH=CH−CH_{2}−CH_{3} (2-pentenoic), HO(O=)C−CH_{2}−CH=CH−CH_{3} (3-pentenoic), or HO(O=)C−CH_{2}−CH_{2}−CH=CH_{2} (4-pentenoic). In the IUPAC-recommended nomenclature, these acids are called pent-2-enoic, pent-3-enoic, and pent-4-enoic, respectively. All these compounds have the empirical formula C_{5}H_{8}O_{2}.

Pentenoic acids are technically mono-unsaturated fatty acids, although they are rare or unknown in biological lipids (fats, waxes, phospholipids, etc.). A salt or ester of such an acid is called a pentenoate.

== Geometric isomers ==
There are actually two 2-pentenoic acids, distinguished by the conformation of the two single C–C bonds adjacent to the double bond: either on the same side of the double bond's plane (cis or Z configuration) or on opposite sides of it (trans or E configuration).

Likewise, there are two 3-pentenoic acids. On the other hand, there is only one 4-pentenoic acid, since the two hydrogen atoms on the last carbon are symmetrically placed across the double bond's plane.

The full list of pentenoic acids is, therefore:

- cis-2-pentenoic or (2Z)-pent-2-enoic acid (CAS 16666-42-5, Nikkaji J97.998H, PUBchem 643793).
- trans-2-pentenoic or (2E)-pent-2-enoic acid (CAS 13991-37-2, FDA 1RG66883CF, Nikkaji J97.997J, Beilstein 1720312, PUBchem 638122, JECFA 1804, FEMA 4193). MP ~10 °C; BP ~108 °C at 17 torr, ~198 °C; odor cheesy, sour. Occurs in banana, beer. Flavoring agent.
- cis-3-pentenoic or (3Z)-pent-3-enoic acid (CAS 33698-87-2, Nikkaji J98.001C, PUBchem 5463134).
- trans-3-pentenoic or (3E)-pent-3-enoic acid (BP ~52 °C at 4 torr) (CAS 1617-32-9, Nikkaji J98.000E, PUBchem 5282706). BP ~187 °C.
- 4-pentenoic or pent-4-enoic acid, 3-vinylpropionic acid (CAS 591-80-0, FDA D4S77Y29FB, Nikkaji J53.731D, Beilstein 1633696, PUBchem 61138, JECFA 314, FEMA 2843). Dens ~0.975 at 25 °C; IoR ~1.428; MP ~ -23 °C; BP ~83 °C at 12 torr, ~188 °C; sol. water, slightly; odor cheese, mustard. Toxic.

== Esters ==
Esters of pentenoic acids include:

- Ethyl cis-2-pentenoate (CAS 27805-84-1, Nikkaji J181.277G, PUBchem 11332473).
- Ethyl trans-2-pentenoate (CAS 24410-84-2, Nikkaji J181.274B, PUBchem 5367761) BP ~150 °C.
- Butyl 2-pentenoate (CAS 79947-84-5, Nikkaji J2.425.129B, PUBchem 5463534).
- Ethyl trans-3-pentenoate (CAS 3724-66-1, Nikkaji J500.934K, PUBchem 5463078).
- ethyl cis-3-pentenoate (CAS 27829-70-5, Nikkaji J746.757E, PUBchem 10997059).
- isopropyl 3-pentenoate (CAS 62030-41-5, Nikkaji J746.761C, PUBchem 5463374).
- Butyl 3-pentenoate (CAS 19825-93-5, PUBchem 5462980) Odor of chamomile. Flavoring agent.

== Derivatives ==
Some derivatives of pentenoic acid include:

- 2-Oxopent-4-enoic acid, transient species possibly produced by Azotobacter vinelandii
- 2-Amino-5-chloro-4-pentenoic acid, found in the mushroom Amanita cokeri
- 2-Methyl-3-pentenoic acid. Some esters are berry fruit flavors.
- 2-Propyl-trans-2-pentenoic acid (2-en-valproic acid), major metabolite of anticonvulsant valproic acid.
- cis-2-methyl-2-pentenoic acid 2-methyl-(2Z)-pent-2-enoic acid. (CAS 1617-37-4, FDA 07B8HQZ433, Nikkaji J421.583D, PUBchem 6436344) BP ~214 °C. Flavoring agent.
- trans-2-Methyl-2-pentenoic acid 2-methyl-(2E)-pent-2-enoic acid. (CAS 16957-70-3, FDA 44I99E898B, Nikkaji J150.063E, PUBchem 5365909) dens ~0.987; IoR ~1.46; MP ~25 °C; BP ~124 °C at 30 torr, ~214 °C; odor fruity, strawberry. Flavoring agent.
- 2-Methyl-2-pentenoic acid, cis/trans mix (CAS 3142-72-1, JECFA 1210, FEMA 3195, PUBchem 18458, US patent 3976801). Dens ~0.983 at 25 °C; IoR ~1.46; MP ~25 °C; BP ~124 °C at 30 torr, ~112 °C at 12 torr; sol. water, slightly; odor acidic, fruity, sweaty. Flavoring and perfuming agent.
- 2-Methyl-4-pentenoic acid, 2-methyl-pent-4-enoic acid. The hexyl ester (CAS 58031-03-1, FDA MGQ3MUU64F, FEMA 3693, PUBchem 53426766, US patents 3966799,3976801) is a flavoring agent for chewing-gum, candy, beverages; .

== Gallery ==
4-Pentenoic acid
trans-2-pentenoic acid
2-Oxo-4-pentenoic acid.

== See also ==
- Valeric acid or pentanoic acid
- Pentynoic acid
- Pentenedioic acid
- hexenoic acid
- Butenoic acid
