= Allyl glycidyl ether =

Names
- IUPAC name 2-(prop-2-enoxymethyl)oxirane
- Other names 2-[(Allyloxy)methyl]oxirane; 1-Allyloxy-2,3-epoxypropane; Glycidyl allyl ether [(2-Propenyloxy)methyl] oxirane

Identifiers
| CAS Number | 106-92-3 |
| 3D model (JSmol) | Interactive image |
| ChemSpider | 13836520 |
| ECHA InfoCard | 100.003.131 |
| EC Number | 203-442-4 |
| PubChem CID | 7838 |
| UNII | HDC0791894 |
| CompTox Dashboard (EPA) | DTXSID9039232 |
- InChI: InChI=1S/C6H10O2/c1-2-3-7-4-6-5-8-6/h2,6H,1,3-5H2 Key: LSWYGACWGAICNM-UHFFFAOYSA-N; InChI=1/C6H10O2/c1-2-3-7-4-6-5-8-6/h2,6H,1,3-5H2 Key: LSWYGACWGAICNM-UHFFFAOYAR
- SMILES: C=CCOCC1CO1

Properties
| Chemical formula | C_{6}H_{10}O_{2} |
| Molar mass | 114.144 g·mol^{−1} |
| Appearance | Colorless liquid |
| Odor | pleasant |
| Density | 0.97 g/mL (20 °C) |
| Melting point | −100 °C; −148 °F; 173 K |
| Boiling point | 154 °C; 309 °F; 427 K |
| Solubility in water | 14% (20°C) |
| Solubility in organic solvents | miscible (acetone, toluene, octane) |
| Vapor pressure | 2 mmHg (20 °C) |
| Refractive index (n_{D}) | 1.4348 (20 °C) |

Hazards
- Occupational safety and health (OHS/OSH)
| Main hazards | poisonous, mild irritant |
- GHS labelling
| Signal word | Danger |
| Hazard statements | H226, H351, H341, H332, H302, H335, H315, H318, H317, H412 |
| Flash point | 57 °C; 135 °F; 330 K |
- Lethal dose or concentration (LD, LC)
| LC_{50} (median concentration) | 270 ppm (mouse, 4 hr); 670 ppm (rat, 8 hr) |
- NIOSH (US health exposure limits)
| PEL (Permissible) | 10 ppm (45 mg/m^{3}) |
| REL (Recommended) | TWA 5 ppm (22 mg/m^{3}) ST 10 ppm (44 mg/m^{3}) [skin] |
| IDLH (Immediate danger) | 50 ppm |
- Except where otherwise noted, data are given for materials in their standard state (at 25 °C [77 °F], 100 kPa). Infobox references

Allyl glycidyl ether is an organic compound used in adhesives and sealants and as a monomer for polymerization reactions. It is formally the condensation product of allyl alcohol and glycidol via an ether linkage. Because it contains both an alkene and an epoxide group, either group can be reacted selectively to yield a product where the other functional group remains intact for future reactions.

== Preparation ==
AGE is prepared commercially by the etherification of allyl alcohol with epichlorohydrin. Hydrogen chloride, the byproduct of their condensation, is removed with a base.

The synthesis of allyl glycidyl ether by condensation of allyl alcohol and epichlorohydrin

AGE can also be synthesized by monoepoxidation of diallyl ether.

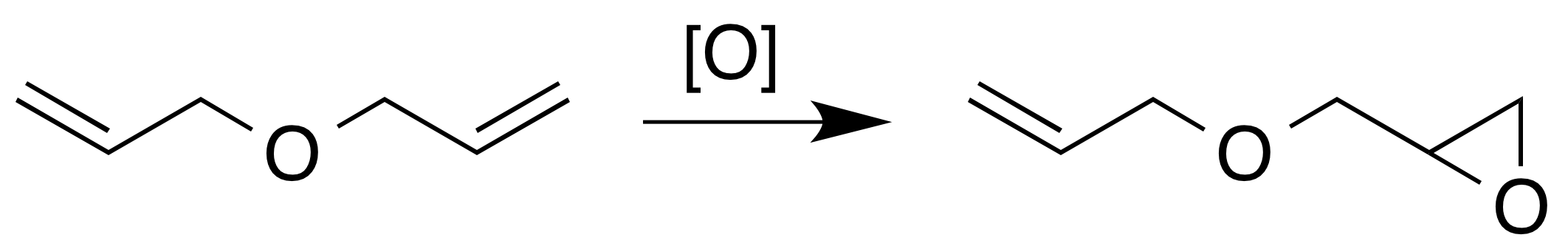
The synthesis of allyl glycidyl ether by epoxidation of diallyl ether

Diepoxidation of the second alkene would produce diglycidyl ether.

Allyl glycidyl ether is chiral. Most routes yield a racemic mixture. Epoxidation using monooxygenase enzyme proceeds enantioselectively.

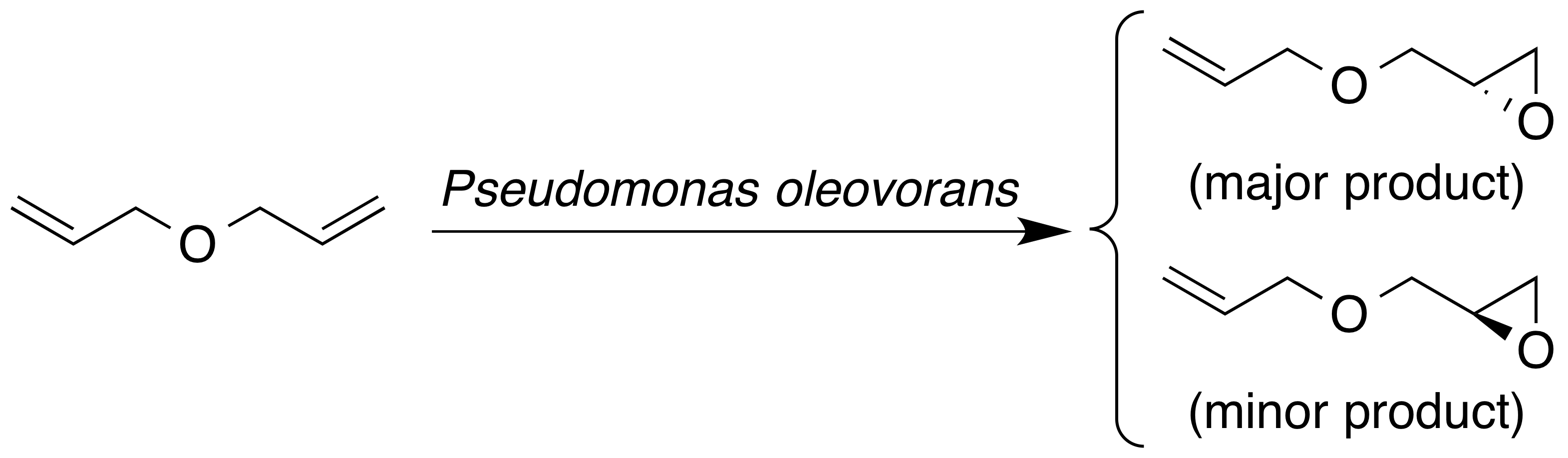
The enantioselective synthesis of allyl glycidyl ether by microbial epoxidation of diallyl ether

Alternately, nucleophilic cyclization of either chirality of the secondary alcohol onto a primary tosylate gives the chiral epoxide product.

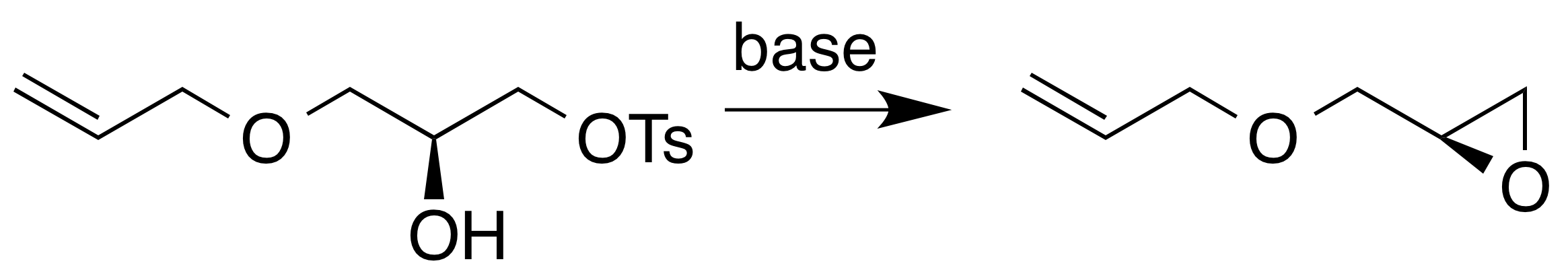
The synthesis of a single enantiomer of allyl glycidyl ether by cyclization of a single enantiomer of the acylic alcohol

== Uses ==
Allyl glycidyl ether is used in adhesives and sealants and as a monomer for various types of polymer preparations.

== Reactions ==
=== Polymerization ===
As a bifunctional compound, the alkene group or the epoxide group can be reacted selectively to yield a product where the other functional group remains intact for future reactions. For example, either one of them could be used for linear polymerization, and then the other used for cross-linking.

Radical polymerization of the propylene portion in the presence of methyl acrylate yields a block copolymer with a high epoxide content. Similarly, it is can be used in the production of polyvinylcaprolactam as a chain transfer agent.

Nucleophilic polymerization of the epoxide groups gives a material that has the same backbone as polyethylene glycol, with allyl-ether side chains. The additional Lewis basic ether sites alter ion transport in the polymer and also affect the transient inter-chain crosslinking and glass transition temperature in the presence of metal ions. These properties suggest that the material may have applications as an alternative electrolyte for lithium-ion batteries. The alkenes can be elaborated into short polyethylene-glycol oligomers to further increase the ion-binding ability and enhance the resulting material properties.

Block copolymers with ethylene oxide form micelles, which could be useful for encapsulating other molecules as part of a drug delivery system. The alkenes of these macromolecular structures can also be cross-linked via radical polymerization.

Lewis-acid-catalyzed co-polymerisation with carbon dioxide likewise gives a polycarbonate material with allyl side chains that can be further elaborated.

=== Hydrosilylation ===
Rather than polymerization, the alkene group can undergo a hydrosilylation reaction with siloxanes in the presence of chloroplatinic acid as catalyst. Like the polymerization reactions, this reaction also leaves the epoxide intact. By this reaction, allyl glycidyl ether finds use as an intermediate in the production of silane coatings for electrical applications.

== See also ==
- Epoxide
- Glycidol
