= Cyclopentene =

Organic compound; 5-sided hydrocarbon ring

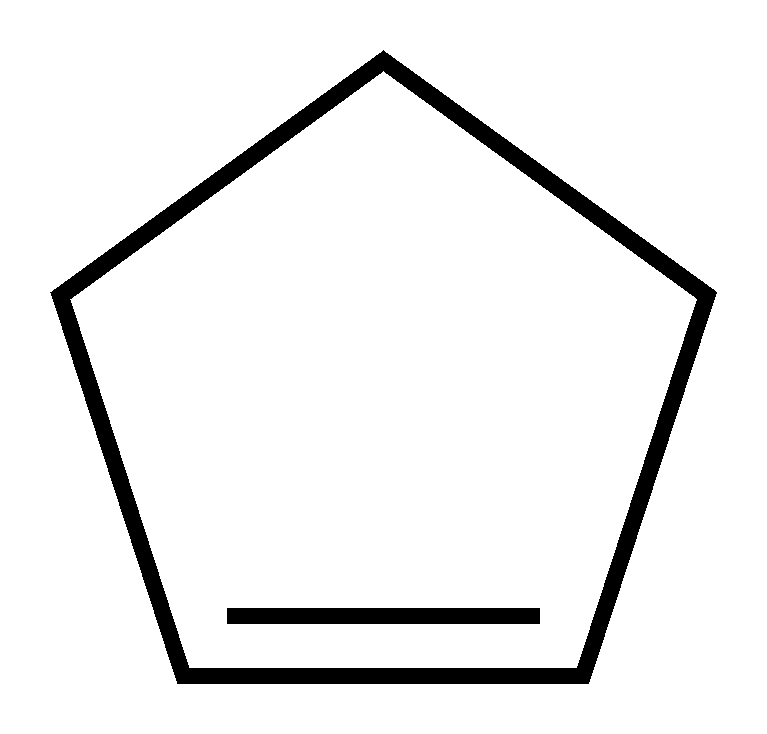
Cyclopentene
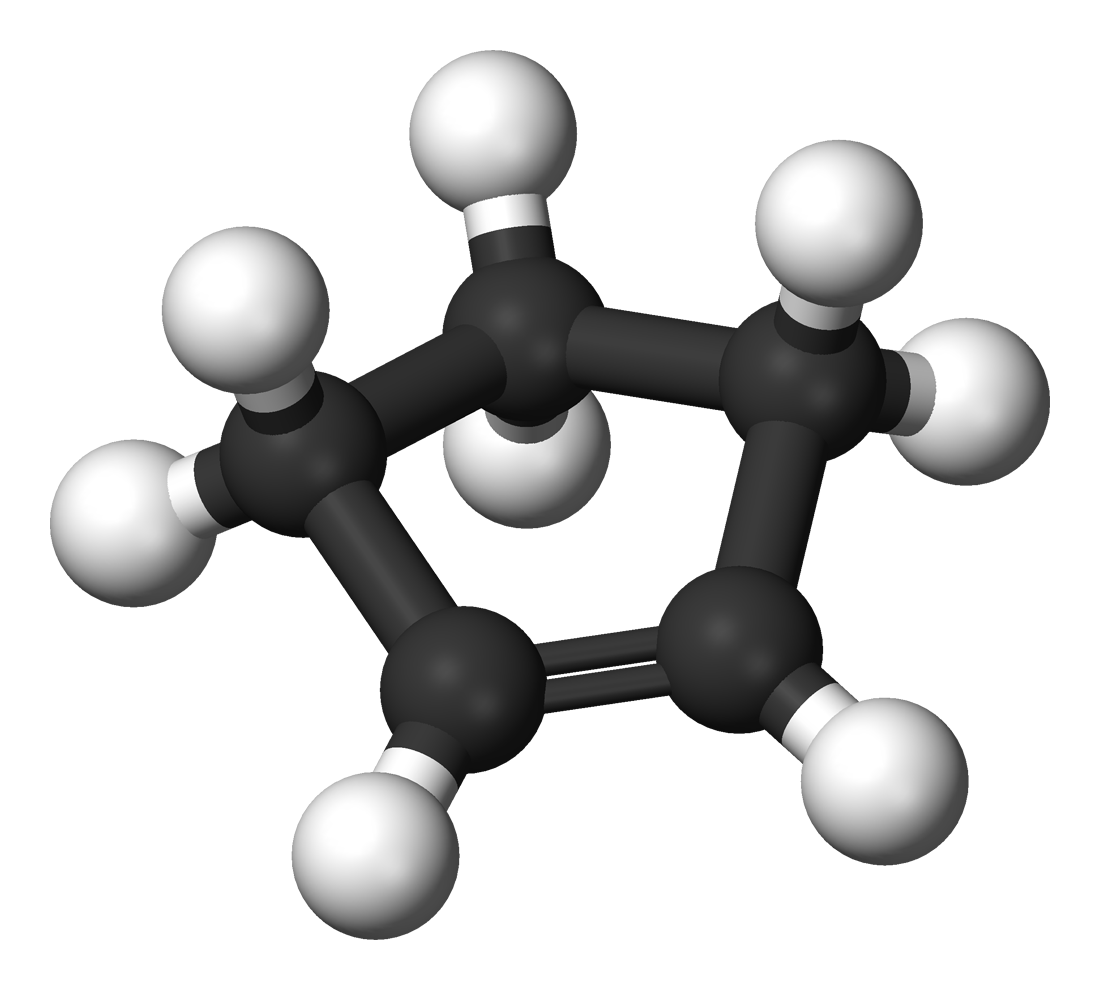
Ball-and-stick model of cyclopentene
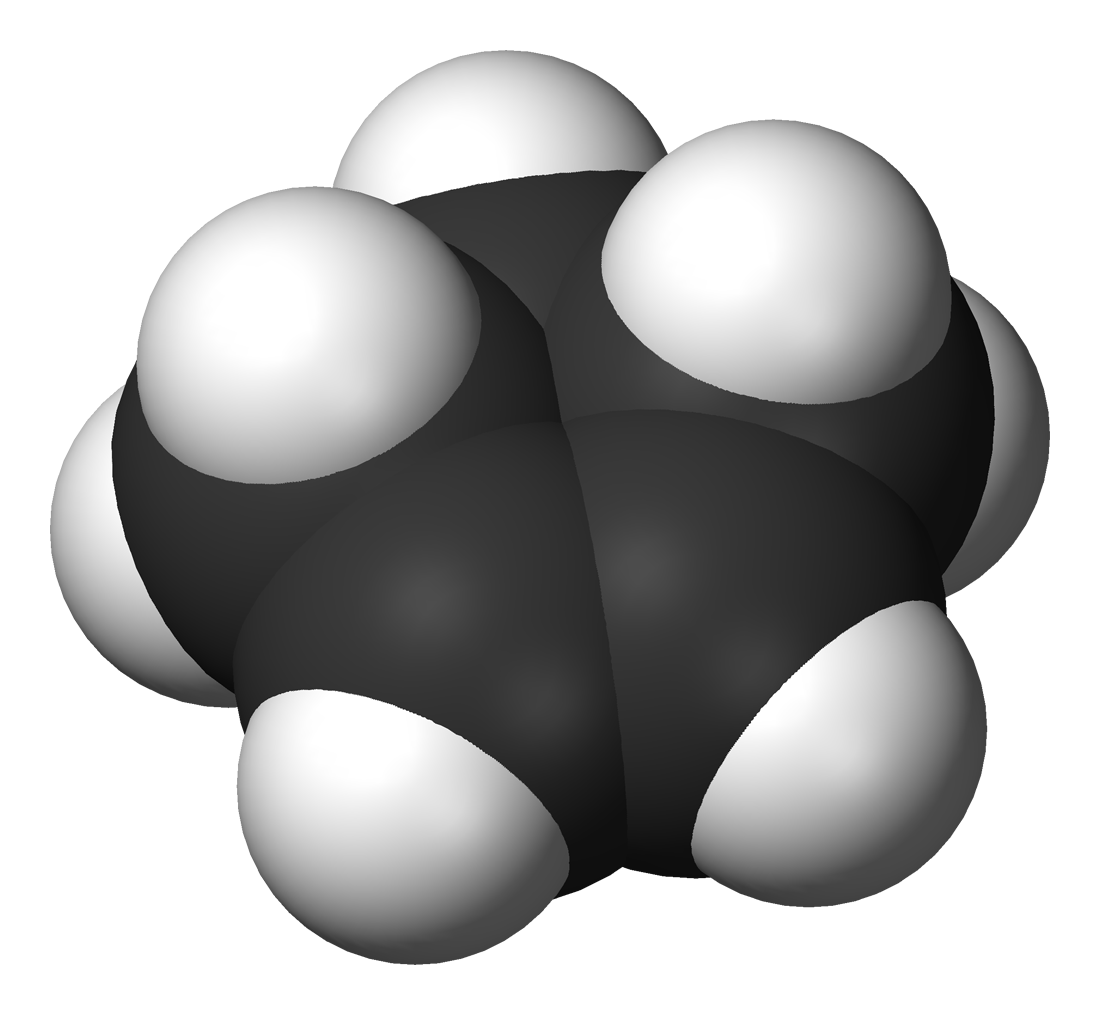
- Space-filling model of cyclopentene

Names
- Preferred IUPAC name Cyclopentene

Identifiers
CAS Number	142-29-0
3D model (JSmol)	Interactive image
ChEBI	CHEBI:49155
ChEMBL	ChEMBL1797299
ChemSpider	8544
ECHA InfoCard	100.005.030
PubChem CID	8882
UNII	ONM2CKV81Z
CompTox Dashboard (EPA)	DTXSID6029171
- InChI: InChI=1S/C5H8/c1-2-4-5-3-1/h1-2H,3-5H2 Key: LPIQUOYDBNQMRZ-UHFFFAOYSA-N; InChI=1/C5H8/c1-2-4-5-3-1/h1-2H,3-5H2 Key: LPIQUOYDBNQMRZ-UHFFFAOYAS
- SMILES: C1CC=CC1

Properties
Chemical formula	C_{5}H_{8}
Molar mass	68.11 g/mol
Density	0.771 g/cm^{3}
Melting point	−135 °C (−211 °F; 138 K)
Boiling point	44 to 46 °C (111 to 115 °F; 317 to 319 K)

Hazards
NFPA 704 (fire diamond)	1 3 1
Flash point	−29 °C (−20 °F; 244 K)

Related compounds
Related compounds	Cyclopentadiene; Cyclobutene
- Except where otherwise noted, data are given for materials in their standard state (at 25 °C [77 °F], 100 kPa). verify (what is ?) Infobox references

Cyclopentene is a chemical compound with the formula (CH_{2})_{3}(CH)_{2}. It is a colorless liquid with a petrol-like odor. It has few applications, and thus is mainly used as a minor component of gasoline, present in concentrations of less than 1%. It is one of the principal cycloalkenes.

== History and synthesis ==
Cyclopentene was first prepared by Carl Gärtner in 1893 from iodocyclopentane with potassium hydroxide. He named it pentamethenylene (German: Pentamethenylen).

Cyclopentene is produced industrially in large amounts by steam cracking of naphtha. In the laboratory, it is prepared by dehydration of cyclopentanol. Substituted cyclopentenes are the product of the vinylcyclopropane-cyclopentene rearrangement.

It can also be produced by the catalytic hydrogenation of cyclopentadiene.

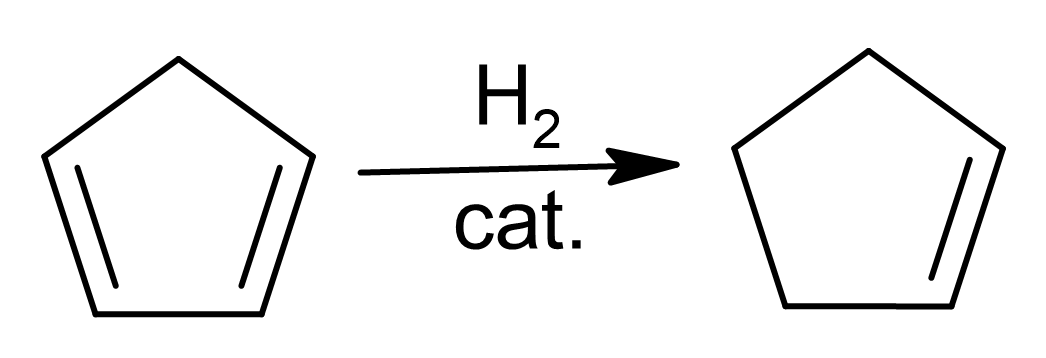

== Reactions ==
The polymerization of cyclopentene by Ziegler-Natta catalysts yields 1,3-linkages, not the more typical 1,2-linked polymer.

Palladium-catalyzed hydrocarboxylation of cyclopentene gives cyclopentanecarboxylic acid:

C_{5}H_{8} + CO + H_{2}O → C_{5}H_{9}CO_{2}H
