= Diglycidyl ether =

Names
- Preferred IUPAC name 2,2′-[Oxybis(methylene)]bis(oxirane)
- Other names Glycidyl ether; Bis-(2,3-epoxypropyl)ether; Diallyl ether dioxide; Diepoxy propyl ether, DGE, 2-Epoxypropyl ether

Identifiers
CAS Number	2238-07-5
3D model (JSmol)	Interactive image
ChemSpider	15839
ECHA InfoCard	100.017.094
EC Number	218-802-6
PubChem CID	16704
RTECS number	KN2350000
UNII	8M5933D775
UN number	2922
CompTox Dashboard (EPA)	DTXSID4051871
- InChI: InChI=1S/C6H10O3/c1(5-3-8-5)7-2-6-4-9-6/h5-6H,1-4H2 Key: GYZLOYUZLJXAJU-UHFFFAOYSA-N; InChI=1/C6H10O3/c1(5-3-8-5)7-2-6-4-9-6/h5-6H,1-4H2 Key: GYZLOYUZLJXAJU-UHFFFAOYAO
- SMILES: O1CC1COCC2OC2

Properties
Chemical formula	C_{6}H_{10}O_{3}
Molar mass	130.143 g·mol^{−1}
Appearance	colorless liquid
Odor	strong, irritating
Density	1.12 g/mL
Boiling point	260 °C; 500 °F; 533 K
Vapor pressure	0.09 mmHg (25°C)

Hazards
- Occupational safety and health (OHS/OSH)
Main hazards	carcinogen
- GHS labelling
Pictograms	(GHS05: Corrosive) (GHS06: Toxic) (GHS07: Exclamation mark)
Signal word	Danger
Hazard statements	H302, H311, H314, H315, H317, H330
Precautionary statements	P260, P264, P270, P271, P272, P280, P284, P301+P312, P301+P330+P331, P302+P352, P303+P361+P353, P304+P340, P305+P351+P338, P310, P312, P320, P321, P330, P332+P313, P333+P313, P361, P362, P363, P403+P233, P405, P501
Flash point	64 °C; 147 °F; 337 K
- Lethal dose or concentration (LD, LC)
LC_{50} (median concentration)	30 ppm (mouse, 4 hr); 86 ppm (mouse, 4 hr); 30 ppm (mouse, 8 hr); 200 ppm (rat, 4 hr); 68 ppm (rat, 8 hr)
- NIOSH (US health exposure limits)
PEL (Permissible)	C 0.5 ppm (2.8 mg/m^{3})
REL (Recommended)	Ca TWA 0.1 ppm (0.5 mg/m^{3})
IDLH (Immediate danger)	Ca [10 ppm]
- Except where otherwise noted, data are given for materials in their standard state (at 25 °C [77 °F], 100 kPa). Infobox references

Diglycidyl ethers are chemical compounds used as a reactive diluents for epoxy resin. Other uses include treating textiles and stabilizing chlorinated organic compounds. Diglycidyl ether itself is extremely toxic, and can prove fatal or cause permanent damage if inhaled or consumed orally. As a class of compounds, there are a number of them available commercially with much lower toxicity profiles. One such example is epoxy resin itself Bisphenol A diglycidyl ether.
