= Xylosan =

Names
- IUPAC name 1,4-Anhydro-α-D-xylopyranose
- Systematic IUPAC name (1R,4R,5R,6R)-2,7-Dioxabicyclo[2.2.1]heptane-5,6-diol

Identifiers
CAS Number	51246-91-4
3D model (JSmol)	Interactive image
ChemSpider	149498
PubChem CID	171001
UNII	35V9MT8B2C
CompTox Dashboard (EPA)	DTXSID401030107
- InChI: InChI=1S/C5H8O4/c6-3-2-1-8-5(9-2)4(3)7/h2-7H,1H2/t2-,3+,4-,5-/m1/s1 Key: OYJJPEGOLXZHDM-KKQCNMDGSA-N; InChI=1/C5H8O4/c6-3-2-1-8-5(9-2)4(3)7/h2-7H,1H2/t2-,3+,4-,5-/m1/s1 Key: OYJJPEGOLXZHDM-KKQCNMDGBS
- SMILES: O[C@@H]1[C@@H](O)[C@H]2O[C@@H]1CO2

Properties
Chemical formula	C_{5}H_{8}O_{4}
Molar mass	132.115 g·mol^{−1}
- Except where otherwise noted, data are given for materials in their standard state (at 25 °C [77 °F], 100 kPa). Infobox references

Xylosan (1,4-anhydro-α-D-xylopyranose) is a molecule produced during pyrolysis of the hemicellulose found in wood. Xylosan is the dehydrated product of the 5-carbon xylose sugar monomer, a major component of hemicellulose.
