= 2-hydroxymuconate-semialdehyde hydrolase =

Class of enzymes

Identifiers
- EC no.: 3.7.1.9
- CAS no.: 54004-61-4

Databases
- IntEnz: IntEnz view
- BRENDA: BRENDA entry
- ExPASy: NiceZyme view
- KEGG: KEGG entry
- MetaCyc: metabolic pathway
- PRIAM: profile
- PDB structures: RCSB PDB PDBe PDBsum
- Gene Ontology: AmiGO / QuickGO
Search
- PMC: articles
- PubMed: articles
- NCBI: proteins

In enzymology, 2-hydroxymuconate-semialdehyde hydrolase (EC 3.7.1.9) is an enzyme that catalyzes the chemical reaction

2-Hydroxymuconate semialdehyde
H_{2}O
HCO_{2}H
H_{2}O
HCO_{2}H
2-Oxopent-4-enoic acid

The two substrates of this enzyme are 2-hydroxymuconate semialdehyde and water. Its products are 2-oxopent-4-enoic acid and formic acid.

This enzyme belongs to the family of hydrolases, specifically those acting on carbon-carbon bonds in ketonic substances. The systematic name of this enzyme class is 2-hydroxymuconate-semialdehyde formylhydrolase. Other names in common use include 2-hydroxy-6-oxohepta-2,4-dienoate hydrolase, 2-hydroxymuconic semialdehyde hydrolase, HMSH, and HOD hydrolase. This enzyme participates in 5 metabolic pathways: benzoate degradation via hydroxylation, toluene and xylene degradation, 1,4-dichlorobenzene degradation, carbazole degradation, and styrene degradation.

== Structural studies ==
As of late 2007, 10 structures have been solved for this class of enzymes, with PDB accession codes 1IUN, 1IUO, 1IUP, 1UK6, 1UK7, 1UK8, 1UK9, 1UKA, 1UKB, and 2D0D.
