= Pyrogallol 1,2-oxygenase =

Identifiers
- EC no.: 1.13.11.35
- CAS no.: 78310-68-6

Databases
- IntEnz: IntEnz view
- BRENDA: BRENDA entry
- ExPASy: NiceZyme view
- KEGG: KEGG entry
- MetaCyc: metabolic pathway
- PRIAM: profile
- PDB structures: RCSB PDB PDBe PDBsum
- Gene Ontology: AmiGO / QuickGO
Search
- PMC: articles
- PubMed: articles
- NCBI: proteins

Pyrogallol 1,2-oxygenase (EC 1.13.11.35) is an enzyme that catalyzes the chemical reaction

pyrogallol
O_{2}
(Z)-5-oxohex-2-enedioic acid

The two substrates of this enzyme are pyrogallol and oxygen. Its product is (Z)-5-oxohex-2-enedioic acid. The enzyme was first isolated from Azotobacter vinelandii.

This enzyme belongs to the family of oxidoreductases, specifically those acting on single donors with O_{2} as oxidant and incorporation of two atoms of oxygen into the substrate (oxygenases). The oxygen incorporated need not be derived from O_{2}. The systematic name of this enzyme class is 1,2,3-trihydroxybenzene:oxygen 1,2-oxidoreductase (decyclizing). This enzyme is also called pyrogallol 1,2-dioxygenase.
