= Catechol 2,3-dioxygenase =

Enzyme

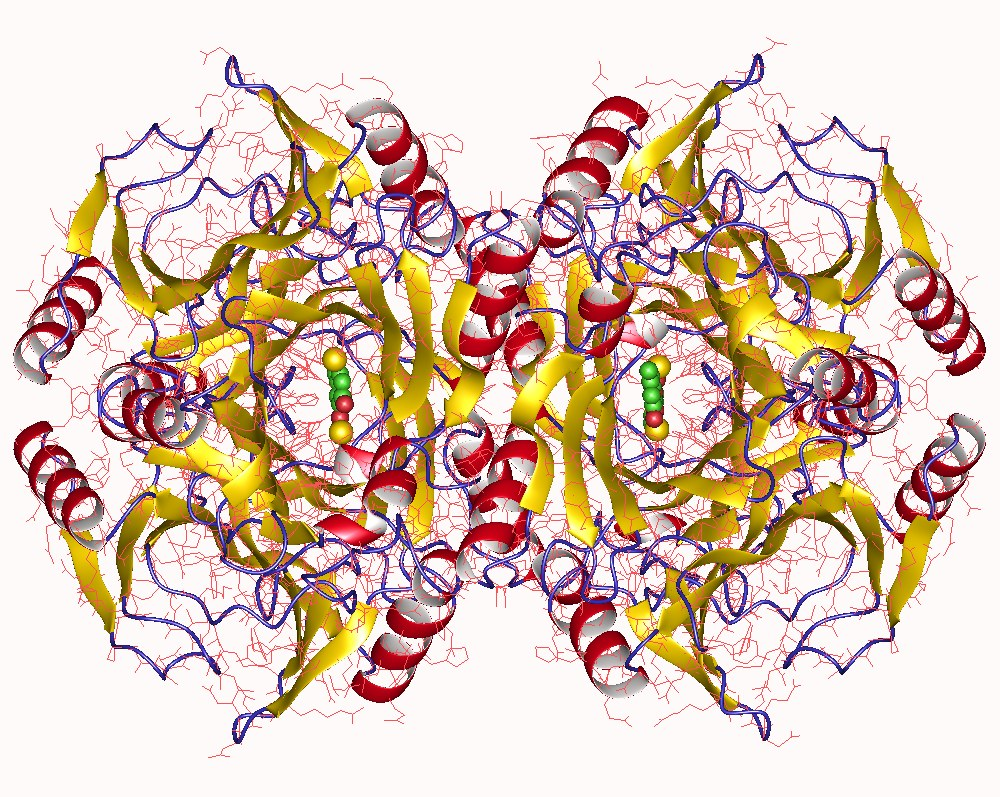
- Catechol 2,3-dioxygenase tetramer, Pseudomonas alkylphenolica

Identifiers
- EC no.: 1.13.11.2
- CAS no.: 9029-46-3

Databases
- BRENDA: enzyme data
- ExPASy: NiceZyme view
- KEGG: enzyme entry
- MetaCyc: metabolic pathway
- Rhea: reactions
- PDB structures: RCSB PDB PDBe PDBsum
Search
- PMC: articles
- PubMed: articles
- NCBI: proteins

Catechol 2,3-dioxygenase (EC 1.13.11.2, 2,3-pyrocatechase, catechol 2,3-oxygenase, catechol oxygenase, metapyrocatechase, pyrocatechol 2,3-dioxygenase) is an enzyme with systematic name catechol:oxygen 2,3-oxidoreductase (decyclizing). This enzyme catalyses the following chemical reaction

catechol
O_{2}
O_{2}
(2E,4Z)-2-hydroxy-6-oxohexa-2,4-dienoic acid

This enzyme contains Fe(II).

The substrate spectrum includes Catechol + O2, 3-Methylcatechol + O2, 4-Methylcatechol + O2, 4-Fluorocatechol + O2, 3-Chlorocatechol + O2, 3,4-Dihydroxybenzoate + O2, Pyrogallol + O2, and Protocatechualdehyde + O2; inhibitors include Monoiodoacetate (weak), o-Phenanthroline (weak), 8-Hydroxyquinoline (weak), Fe2+, 3-[(Methylthio)methyl]catechol, 3-Chlorocatechol, 4-Chlorocatechol, Tiron, CuCl, CuSO4, o-Nitrophenol, m-Phenanthroline, ATP, Mg2+, Na2B4O7 (i.e. Borax), p-Chloromercuribenzoate, Acetone, Hg2+, Ag+, and NO; Metal compounds/salts include Fe2+ (4 atoms of iron per mol of enzyme, 1 atom of iron per molecule, 3 atoms of irons per mol of enzyme, active site Fe2+, activity is closely related to specific content of iron in this protein, FeCl2 and FeSO4 activate metapyrocatechase 2, no effect on metapyrocatechase 1.
