= 4-oxalocrotonate decarboxylase =

Class of enzymes

Identifiers
- EC no.: 4.1.1.77
- CAS no.: 37325-55-6

Databases
- BRENDA: enzyme data
- ExPASy: NiceZyme view
- KEGG: enzyme entry
- MetaCyc: metabolic pathway
- Rhea: reactions
- PDB structures: RCSB PDB PDBe PDBsum
- Gene Ontology: AmiGO / QuickGO
Search
- PMC: articles
- PubMed: articles
- NCBI: proteins

The enzyme 4-oxalocrotonate decarboxylase (EC 4.1.1.77), characterised from a Pseudomonas species, catalyzes the decarboxylation of (Z)-5-oxohex-2-enedioic acid to (Z)-2-hydroxypenta-2,4-dienoic acid and carbon dioxide:

(Z)-5-oxohex-2-enedioic acid
CO_{2}
(Z)-2-hydroxypenta-2,4-dienoic acid

The reaction is part of the breakdown pathway for phenols and substituted phenols in bacteria, for example when pyrogallol 1,2-oxygenase gives the starting material. Early studies indicated that alternative tautomers of the starting material were accepted as substrates, but later work showed that the single tautomer shown is the material acted on. The range of phenolic compounds that can be degraded by bacteria means that the enzyme is of interest in bioremediation.

This enzyme is a lyase, specifically a carboxy-lyase, which cleave carbon-carbon bonds. The systematic name of this enzyme class is 4-oxalocrotonate carboxy-lyase (2-oxopent-4-enoate-forming). This enzyme is also called 4-oxalocrotonate carboxy-lyase.
