= Cyclopentanecarboxylic acid =

Identifiers
CAS Number	3400-45-1
3D model (JSmol)	Interactive image
ChEMBL	ChEMBL1902018
ChemSpider	17789
ECHA InfoCard	100.020.245
EC Number	222-269-5
PubChem CID	18840
UNII	Z6691VH94A
CompTox Dashboard (EPA)	DTXSID70187610
- InChI: InChI=1S/C6H10O2/c7-6(8)5-3-1-2-4-5/h5H,1-4H2,(H,7,8) Key: JBDSSBMEKXHSJF-UHFFFAOYSA-N
- SMILES: C1CCC(C1)C(=O)O

Properties
Chemical formula	C_{6}H_{10}O_{2}
Molar mass	114.144 g·mol^{−1}
Appearance	colorless oil
Density	1.0510 g/cm^{3}
Melting point	−7 °C (19 °F; 266 K)
Boiling point	212 °C (414 °F; 485 K)

Hazards
- GHS labelling
Pictograms	(GHS07: Exclamation mark)
Signal word	Warning
Hazard statements	H315, H319, H335
Precautionary statements	P261, P264, P264+P265, P271, P280, P302+P352, P304+P340, P305+P351+P338, P319, P321, P332+P317, P337+P317, P362+P364, P403+P233, P405, P501
- Except where otherwise noted, data are given for materials in their standard state (at 25 °C [77 °F], 100 kPa). Infobox references

Cyclopentanecarboxylic acid is an organic compound with the formula C_{5}H_{9}CO_{2}H. It is a colorless nonvolatile oil. It can be produced by the palladium-catalyzed hydrocarboxylation of cyclopentene:

C_{5}H_{8} + CO + H_{2}O → C_{5}H_{9}CO_{2}H

An alternative route involves the Favorskii rearrangement, which is a base-induced ring contraction of 2-chlorocyclohexanone to give the ester methyl cyclopentanecarboxylate, which can be hydrolyzed to the carboxylic acid.

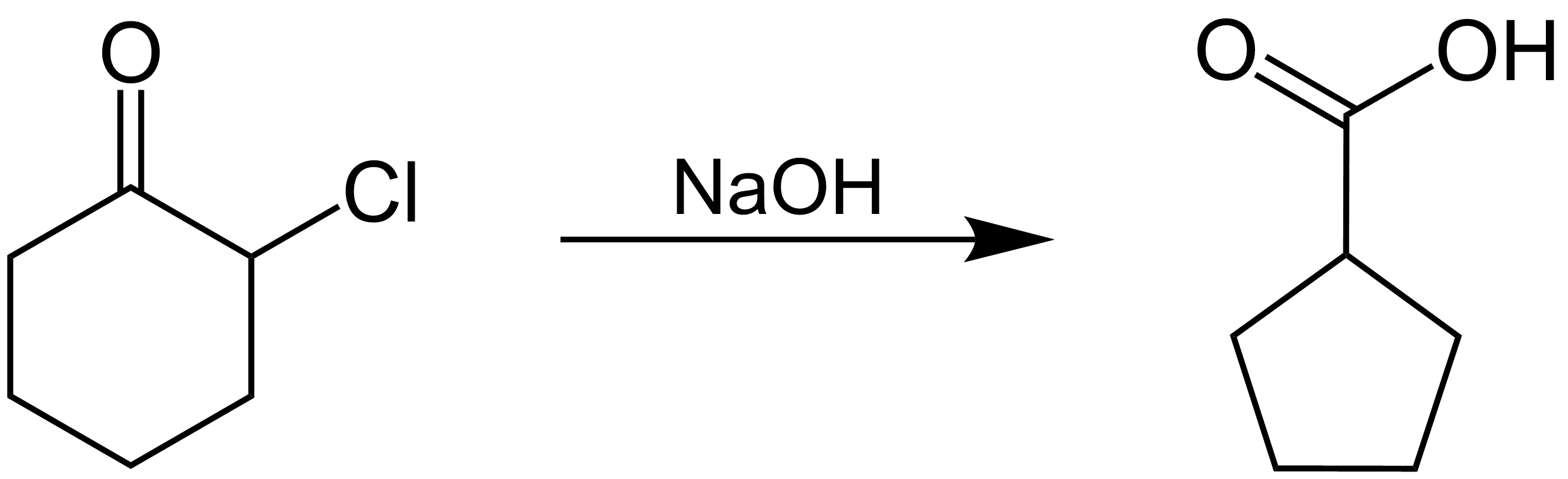
