= (2R)-2-Methylpent-4-enoic acid =

Names
- Preferred IUPAC name (2R)-2-Methylpent-4-enoic acid

Identifiers
| CAS Number | 63527-49-1 |
| 3D model (JSmol) | Interactive image |
| ChemSpider | 5506024 |
| EC Number | 216-404-7 |
| PubChem CID | 7167861 |
| UNII | 4EC6RYQ4M5 |
| CompTox Dashboard (EPA) | DTXSID10428231 |
- InChI: InChI=1S/C6H10O2/c1-3-4-5(2)6(7)8/h3,5H,1,4H2,2H3,(H,7,8)/t5-/m1/s1 Key: HVRZYSHVZOELOH-RXMQYKEDSA-N
- SMILES: CC(CC=C)C(=O)O

Properties
| Chemical formula | C_{6}H_{10}O_{2} |
| Molar mass | 114.144 g·mol^{−1} |
| Density | 0.946 g/cm3 |
| Melting point | 87–88 °C (189–190 °F; 360–361 K) |
| Vapor pressure | 0.237 Torr |
| Acidity (pK_{a}) | 4.67 |
- Except where otherwise noted, data are given for materials in their standard state (at 25 °C [77 °F], 100 kPa). Infobox references

(2R)-2-Methylpent-4-enoic acid is an organic acid with the chemical formula C_{6}H_{10}O_{2}. Other names for this molecule include (R)-2-methyl-4-pentenoic acid, (R)-(−)-2-methyl-4-pentenoic acid, and methylallylacetic acid.

== Synthesis ==
(R)-2-Methylpent-4-enoic acid can be synthesized using a chiral auxiliary such an oxazolidinone derivative, popularized by David Evans. One route of synthesis consists of three steps:

1. acylation of the oxazolidinone using triethylamine as a base, and DMAP as an acyl carrier catalyst
2. addition of a pentene group via enolate addition using Sodium bis(trimethylsilyl)amide as a base and allyl iodide as the pentene donor
3. and cleavage of the oxazolidinone by LiOH solution in hydrogen peroxide. and sulfite to reduce the peroxide to the acid.

== Uses ==
(R)-2-Methylpent-4-enoic acid can also be used in synthesis of other chiral compounds. For example, it has been used in the process of synthesizing the drug Sacubitril as a reagent for adding a chiral center to the molecule.
