= Transhydrogenase =

Transhydrogenase may stand for

- NAD(P)+ transhydrogenase (Re/Si-specific)
- NAD(P)+ transhydrogenase (Si-specific)
- Proton-Translocating NAD(P)+ Transhydrogenase
- Hydroxyacid-oxoacid transhydrogenase
- Glutathione—cystine transhydrogenase
- Lactate—malate transhydrogenase
- Glutathione—homocystine transhydrogenase
- Glutathione—CoA-glutathione transhydrogenase
