= Nicotinamide adenine dinucleotide (phosphate) transhydrogenase =

Nicotinamide adenine dinucleotide (phosphate) transhydrogenase may refer to:

- NAD(P)+ transhydrogenase (Re/Si-specific)
- NAD(P)+ transhydrogenase (Si-specific)
