= NADK2 =

Enzyme

Identifiers
- Aliases: NADK2, C5orf33, MNADK, NADKD1, DECRD, NAD kinase 2, mitochondrial
- External IDs: OMIM: 615787; MGI: 1915896; GeneCards: NADK2
Enzyme activity
EC #	BRENDA	ExPASy	KEGG	MetaCyc
2.7.1.23	↗	↗	↗	↗

Gene location (Human)
Chr.	Chromosome 5 (human)
Band	5p13.2	Start	36,192,589 bp
Band	5p13.2	End	36,242,279 bp

Gene location (Mouse)
Chr.	Chromosome 15 (mouse)
Band	15|15 A1	Start	9,071,340 bp
Band	15|15 A1	End	9,110,979 bp
RNA expression pattern
Bgee	Human / Mouse (ortholog); Top expressed in: liver; right lobe of liver; pancreatic epithelial cell; ventricular zone; endothelial cell; medulla oblongata; renal medulla; superior vestibular nucleus; ventral tegmental area; internal globus pallidus / Top expressed in: neural layer of retina; olfactory epithelium; liver; lumbar subsegment of spinal cord; atrium; blood; hand; left lobe of liver; spermatid; suprachiasmatic nucleus; More reference expression data
BioGPS	n/a
Gene ontology
Molecular function	transferase activity; nucleotide binding; ATP binding; protein homodimerization activity; kinase activity; NAD+ kinase activity
Cellular component	mitochondrion; mitochondrial matrix
Biological process	metabolism; NADP biosynthetic process; phosphorylation; NAD metabolic process
Sources:Amigo / QuickGO
Orthologs
Databases	NCBI: entry; OMA: entry
Species	Human	Mouse
Entrez	133686	68646
Ensembl	ENSG00000152620	ENSMUSG00000022253
UniProt	Q4G0N4	Q8C5H8
RefSeq (mRNA)	NM_001085411; NM_001287340; NM_001287341; NM_153013	NM_001040395; NM_001085410; NM_001286253; NM_001286255
RefSeq (protein)	NP_001078880; NP_001274269; NP_001274270; NP_694558	NP_001035485; NP_001078879; NP_001273182; NP_001273184
Location (UCSC)	Chr 5: 36.19 – 36.24 Mb	Chr 15: 9.07 – 9.11 Mb
PubMed search
- Wikidata
View/Edit Human	View/Edit Mouse

Nicotinamide adenine dinucleotide kinase 2, mitochondrial (NADK2), is a mitochondrial enzyme encoded by the human NADK2 gene. In eukaryotes it maintains the mitochondrial NADP(H) pool by phosphorylating NAD^{+} and NADH. NADPH plays a central role in mitochondrial metabolism by providing reducing power for protection against oxidative stress and for mitochondrial fatty acid synthesis (mtFAS), proline biosynthesis, lysine degradation, and the beta oxidation of polyunsaturated fatty acids. NADK2 was identified in humans by Ohashi et al. in 2012, more than a decade after its cytosolic counterpart, NADK1. Mutations in the NADK2 gene cause an autosomal recessive disorder known as NADK2 deficiency.

== Reaction ==
NADK2 catalyzes the following reactions:

ATP + NAD^{+} → ADP + NADP^{+}
ATP + NADH → ADP + NADPH

The NADH kinase activity of NADK2 has catalytic efficiency comparable to its NAD^{+} kinase activity.

== Structure ==
NADK2 differs from other NAD kinases by containing an additional structural insert that alters its assembly. While most NAD kinases form tetramers, NADK2 exists as a stable homodimer. As a result, its activity remains relatively constant and does not increase upon oligomerization, unlike other NAD kinases.

== Function ==
Because NADP(H), which exists in oxidized (NADP^{+}) and reduced (NADPH) forms, cannot cross the mitochondrial membrane, eukaryotic cells maintain separate cytosolic and mitochondrial NADP(H) pools through dedicated NAD kinases. In mitochondria, NADK2 catalyzes the phosphorylation of NAD^{+} to NADP^{+} and, notably, can also phosphorylate NADH to NADPH. NADP^{+} generated by NADK2 or by NADPH oxidation is reduced to NADPH by enzymes including NNT, GLUD1, ME2, ALDH1L2, and IDH2. By contrast, using NADH as a substrate allows NADK2 to generate mitochondrial NADPH directly and rapidly, albeit at the expense of ATP. These reactions maintain a predominantly reduced NADPH pool that provides electrons for central mitochondrial processes. As mitochondria are a major source of oxidative stress due to reactive oxygen species (ROS) generated by the electron transport chain, they depend on NADPH for antioxidant protection. Mitochondrial NADPH fulfills this role by regenerating glutathione and thioredoxin via glutathione reductase and thioredoxin reductase, respectively, thereby supporting the detoxification of ROS. NADPH also fuels mitochondrial fatty acid synthesis (mtFAS) through enzymes such as MECR, contributing to protein lipoylation as well as mitochondrial translation, electron transport chain assembly, and citric acid cycle function. In addition, NADPH is used by enzymes including pyrroline-5-carboxylate synthase (P5CS) in proline biosynthesis, alpha-aminoadipic semialdehyde synthase (AASS) in lysine degradation, and 2,4-dienoyl-CoA reductase 1 (DECR) in the auxiliary pathway of mitochondrial beta oxidation of polyunsaturated fatty acids.

== Clinical significance ==
Recessive mutations in NADK2 cause NADK2 deficiency, an inherited metabolic disorder characterized by neurological symptoms including hypotonia, developmental delay, ataxia, and encephalopathy. Affected individuals also show metabolic abnormalities, including hyperlysinemia and impaired fat oxidation with elevated C10:2-carnitine levels, consistent with secondary 2,4-dienoyl-CoA reductase deficiency.

Cancer cells are exposed to elevated oxidative stress and are consequently highly dependent on mitochondrial NADPH to maintain redox homeostasis. NADK2 is essential for mitochondrial NADPH production and has therefore been proposed as a potential target to increase oxidative stress and sensitize cancer cells to apoptosis. A lack of NADK2 additionally impairs proline biosynthesis, rendering cancer cells dependent on exogenous proline for proliferation.

NADK2 has been linked to Alzheimer's disease. Tau oligomers upregulate NADK2 in human neurons, leading to increased mitochondrial NADPH production, which in turn increases LRP1 expression and promotes tau uptake, creating a self-reinforcing cycle.
