= Nicotinamide nucleotide transhydrogenase =

Nicotinamide nucleotide transhydrogenase may stand for

- NAD(P)+ transhydrogenase (Re/Si-specific)
- NAD(P)+ transhydrogenase (Si-specific)
- NNT (gene)
