= NADH transhydrogenase =

NADH transhydrogenase may refer to:

- NAD(P)+ transhydrogenase (Re/Si-specific)
- NAD(P)+ transhydrogenase (Si-specific)
