= NAD(P)+ transhydrogenase =

NAD(P)+ transhydrogenase may stand for

- NAD(P)+ transhydrogenase (Re/Si-specific)
- NAD(P)+ transhydrogenase (Si-specific)
