= NADK =

NADK may refer to:

- NAD^{+} kinase, an enzyme
- National Army of Democratic Kampuchea, a Cambodian guerrilla force
