= NNT =

NNT could refer to:

- Nan Airport, Thailand; IATA airport code NNT
- The Nakai–Nam Theun National Biodiversity Conservation Area in Laos
- Nassim Nicholas Taleb
- Number needed to treat, an epidemiological measure
- Nunthorpe railway station, England; National Rail station code NNT
- NAD(P) transhydrogenase, mitochondrial, a human enzyme encoded by the NNT gene
