= Hydrogen dehydrogenase (NADP+) =

hydrogen dehydrogenase (NADP+)

Identifiers
- EC no.: 1.12.1.3
- CAS no.: 9027-05-8

Databases
- IntEnz: IntEnz view
- BRENDA: BRENDA entry
- ExPASy: NiceZyme view
- KEGG: KEGG entry
- MetaCyc: metabolic pathway
- PRIAM: profile
- PDB structures: RCSB PDB PDBe PDBsum
- Gene Ontology: AmiGO / QuickGO
Search
- PMC: articles
- PubMed: articles
- NCBI: proteins

In enzymology, a hydrogen dehydrogenase (NADP+) (EC 1.12.1.3) is an enzyme that catalyzes the chemical reaction

H_{2} + NADP^{+} $\rightleftharpoons$ H^{+} + NADPH

Thus, the two substrates of this enzyme are H_{2} and NADP^{+}, whereas its two products are H^{+} and NADPH.

This enzyme belongs to the family of oxidoreductases, specifically those acting on hydrogen as donor with NAD+ or NADP+ as acceptor. The systematic name of this enzyme class is hydrogen:NADP+ oxidoreductase. Other names in common use include NADP+-linked hydrogenase, NADP+-reducing hydrogenase, hydrogen dehydrogenase (NADP+), and simply hydrogenase (which is ambiguous).

== Structural studies ==
As of late 2007, only one structure has been solved for this class of enzymes, with the PDB accession code 2AUV.
