= NAD+ kinase =

Class of enzymes

NAD^{+} kinase
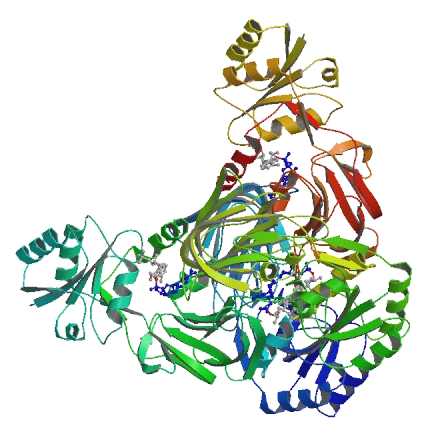
- Ribbon diagram of NAD^{+} kinase in complex with substrates.

Identifiers
- EC no.: 2.7.1.23
- CAS no.: 9032-66-0

Databases
- BRENDA: enzyme data
- ExPASy: NiceZyme view
- KEGG: enzyme entry
- MetaCyc: metabolic pathway
- Rhea: reactions
- PDB structures: RCSB PDB PDBe PDBsum
- Gene Ontology: AmiGO / QuickGO
Search
- PMC: articles
- PubMed: articles
- NCBI: proteins

NADK
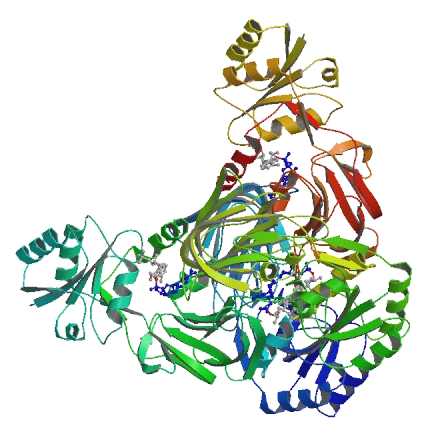

Identifiers
- Aliases: NADK, dJ283E3.1, NAD kinase
- External IDs: OMIM: 611616; MGI: 2183149; GeneCards: NADK
Available structures
PDB	Ortholog search: PDBe RCSB
PDB	List of PDB id codes 3PFN
Enzyme activity
EC #	BRENDA	ExPASy	KEGG	MetaCyc
2.7.1.23	↗	↗	↗	↗

Gene location (Human)
Chr.	Chromosome 1 (human)
Band	1p36.33	Start	1,751,232 bp
Band	1p36.33	End	1,780,457 bp

Gene location (Mouse)
Chr.	Chromosome 4 (mouse)
Band	4|4 E2	Start	155,646,835 bp
Band	4|4 E2	End	155,675,458 bp
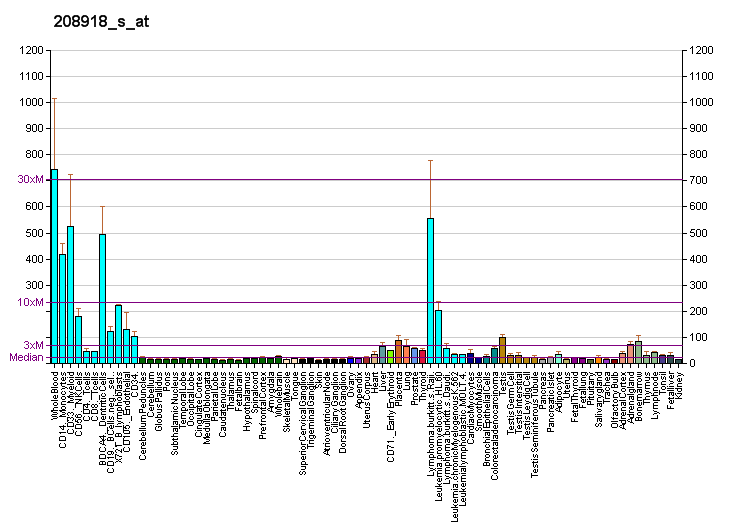

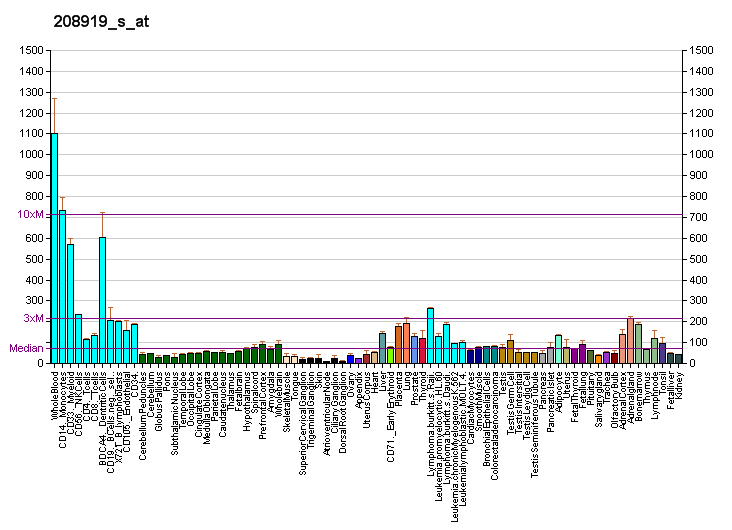

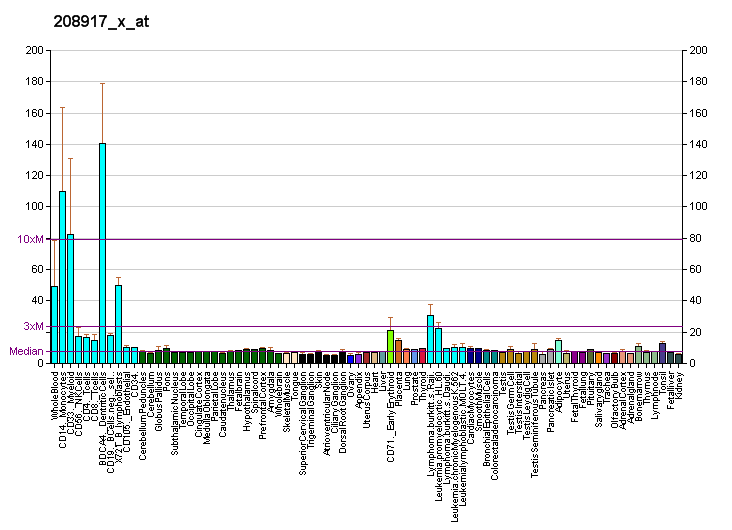
RNA expression pattern
Bgee	Human / Mouse (ortholog); Top expressed in: blood; granulocyte; monocyte; spleen; right lobe of liver; right adrenal gland; right adrenal cortex; left adrenal cortex; mucosa of transverse colon; gastric mucosa / Top expressed in: granulocyte; pyloric antrum; brown adipose tissue; right kidney; gastric mucosa; tibiofemoral joint; adrenal gland; left lobe of liver; mucous cell of stomach; proximal tubule; More reference expression data
BioGPS	More reference expression data
Gene ontology
Molecular function	transferase activity; nucleotide binding; NAD+ kinase activity; protein binding; ATP binding; metal ion binding; kinase activity
Cellular component	cytosol
Biological process	ATP metabolic process; metabolism; NADP biosynthetic process; NAD metabolic process; phosphorylation; positive regulation of insulin secretion involved in cellular response to glucose stimulus
Sources:Amigo / QuickGO
Orthologs
Databases	NCBI: entry; OMA: entry
Species	Human	Mouse
Entrez	65220	192185
Ensembl	ENSG00000008130	ENSMUSG00000029063
UniProt	O95544	P58058
RefSeq (mRNA)	NM_001198993; NM_001198994; NM_001198995; NM_023018; NM_001353641 NM_001353642	NM_001159637; NM_138671; NM_001355599
RefSeq (protein)	NP_001185922; NP_001185923; NP_001185924; NP_075394; NP_001340570 NP_001340571	NP_001153109; NP_619612; NP_001342528
Location (UCSC)	Chr 1: 1.75 – 1.78 Mb	Chr 4: 155.65 – 155.68 Mb
PubMed search
- Wikidata
View/Edit Human	View/Edit Mouse

An NAD^{+} kinase (EC 2.7.1.23, NADK) is a type of enzyme that converts nicotinamide adenine dinucleotide (NAD^{+}) into NADP^{+}. More narrowly, the term "NAD^{+} kinase" can also refer to the specific cytosolic enzyme that in humans is encoded by the gene NADK. NADP^{+} is an essential coenzyme that is reduced to NADPH primarily by the pentose phosphate pathway to provide reducing power in biosynthetic processes such as fatty acid biosynthesis and nucleotide synthesis. The structure of the NADK from the archaean Archaeoglobus fulgidus has been determined.

Since NADP(H) cannot cross subcellular membranes, eukaryotic cells have separate NADP(H) pools that are maintained by specific NAD kinases:

- Cytosol: NADK (also called NADK1)
- Mitochondria: NADK2

Notably, NADK2 can also function as an NADH kinase with comparable catalytic efficiency.

== Reaction ==
The reaction catalyzed by NADK is

ATP + NAD^{+} $\rightleftharpoons$ ADP + NADP^{+}

== Mechanism ==
NADK phosphorylates NAD^{+} at the 2’ position of the ribose ring that carries the adenine moiety. It is highly selective for its substrates, NAD and ATP, and does not tolerate modifications either to the phosphoryl acceptor, NAD, or the pyridine moiety of the phosphoryl donor, ATP. NADK also uses metal ions to coordinate the ATP in the active site. In vitro studies with various divalent metal ions have shown that zinc and manganese are preferred over magnesium, while copper and nickel are not accepted by the enzyme at all. A proposed mechanism involves the 2' alcohol oxygen acting as a nucleophile to attack the gamma-phosphoryl of ATP, releasing ADP.

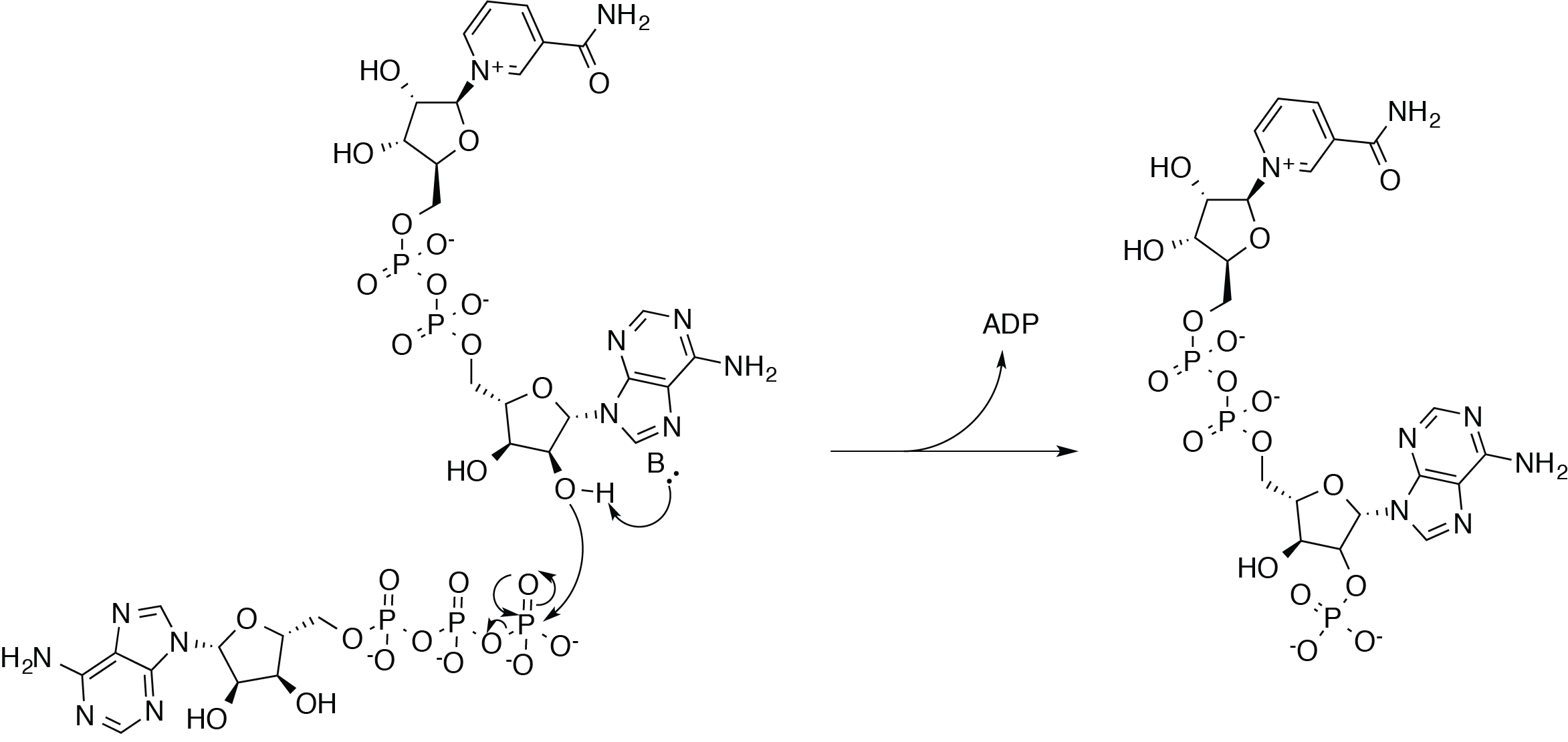
Proposed mechanism of action for NAD^{+} phosphorylation by NADK

== Regulation ==
NADK is highly regulated by the redox state of the cell. Whereas NAD is predominantly found in its oxidized state NAD^{+}, the phosphorylated NADP is largely present in its reduced form, as NADPH. Thus, NADK can modulate responses to oxidative stress by controlling NADP synthesis. Bacterial NADK is shown to be inhibited allosterically by both NADPH and NADH. NADK is also reportedly stimulated by calcium/calmodulin binding in certain cell types, such as neutrophils. NAD kinases in plants and sea urchin eggs have also been found to bind calmodulin.

== Clinical significance ==
Due to the essential role of NADPH in lipid and DNA biosynthesis and the hyperproliferative nature of most cancers, NADK is an attractive target for cancer therapy. Furthermore, NADPH is required for the antioxidant activities of thioredoxin reductase and glutaredoxin. Thionicotinamide and other nicotinamide analogs are potential inhibitors of NADK, and studies show that treatment of colon cancer cells with thionicotinamide suppresses the cytosolic NADPH pool to increase oxidative stress and synergizes with chemotherapy.

While the role of NADK in increasing the NADPH pool appears to offer protection against apoptosis, there are also cases where NADK activity appears to potentiate cell death. Genetic studies done in human haploid cell lines indicate that knocking out NADK may protect from certain non-apoptotic stimuli.

== See also ==
- Oxidative phosphorylation
- Electron transport chain
- Metabolism
