= NADH kinase =

Class of enzymes

Identifiers
- EC no.: 2.7.1.86
- CAS no.: 62213-39-2

Databases
- IntEnz: IntEnz view
- BRENDA: BRENDA entry
- ExPASy: NiceZyme view
- KEGG: KEGG entry
- MetaCyc: metabolic pathway
- PRIAM: profile
- PDB structures: RCSB PDB PDBe PDBsum
- Gene Ontology: AmiGO / QuickGO
Search
- PMC: articles
- PubMed: articles
- NCBI: proteins

NADH kinase (EC 2.7.1.86) is an enzyme that catalyzes the chemical reaction.

ATP +
nicotinamide adenine dinucleotide
ADP +
nicotinamide adenine dinucleotide phosphate

The enzyme characterised from yeast converts nicotinamide adenine dinucleotide to nicotinamide adenine dinucleotide phosphate by transferring a phosphate group from the cofactor, adenosine triphosphate (ATP), which is converted to adenosine diphosphate (ADP). The enzyme is encoded by the gene NADK2.

This enzyme is a transferases, specifically one transferring phosphorus-containing groups (phosphotransferases) with an alcohol group as acceptor. The systematic name of this enzyme class is ATP:NADH 2'-phosphotransferase. Other names in common use include reduced nicotinamide adenine dinucleotide kinase (phosphorylating), DPNH kinase, reduced diphosphopyridine nucleotide kinase, and NADH kinase. This enzyme has at least one activator, acetate.
