= Lactate—malate transhydrogenase =

lactate—malate transhydrogenase

Identifiers
- EC no.: 1.1.99.7
- CAS no.: 9077-15-0

Databases
- IntEnz: IntEnz view
- BRENDA: BRENDA entry
- ExPASy: NiceZyme view
- KEGG: KEGG entry
- MetaCyc: metabolic pathway
- PRIAM: profile
- PDB structures: RCSB PDB PDBe PDBsum
- Gene Ontology: AmiGO / QuickGO
Search
- PMC: articles
- PubMed: articles
- NCBI: proteins

In enzymology, lactate—malate transhydrogenase (EC 1.1.99.7) is an enzyme that catalyzes the chemical reaction

(S)-lactic acid
+
oxaloacetic acid
pyruvic acid
+
(S)-malic acid

The two substrates of this enzyme are (S)-lactic acid and oxaloacetic acid. Its products are pyruvic acid and malic acid.

This enzyme belongs to the family of oxidoreductases, specifically those acting on the CH-OH group of donor with other acceptors. The systematic name of this enzyme class is (S)-lactate:oxaloacetate oxidoreductase. This enzyme is also called malate-lactate transhydrogenase. This enzyme participates in pyruvate metabolism. It employs one cofactor, nicotinamide D-ribonucleotide.
