= Glutathione—CoA-glutathione transhydrogenase =

glutathione-CoA—glutathione transhydrogenase

Identifiers
- EC no.: 1.8.4.3
- CAS no.: 37256-48-7

Databases
- IntEnz: IntEnz view
- BRENDA: BRENDA entry
- ExPASy: NiceZyme view
- KEGG: KEGG entry
- MetaCyc: metabolic pathway
- PRIAM: profile
- PDB structures: RCSB PDB PDBe PDBsum
- Gene Ontology: AmiGO / QuickGO
Search
- PMC: articles
- PubMed: articles
- NCBI: proteins

In enzymology, a glutathione—CoA-glutathione transhydrogenase (EC 1.8.4.3) is an enzyme that catalyzes the chemical reaction

CoA + glutathione disulfide $\rightleftharpoons$ CoA-glutathione + glutathione

Thus, the two substrates of this enzyme are CoA and glutathione disulfide, whereas its two products are CoA-glutathione and glutathione.

This enzyme belongs to the family of oxidoreductases, specifically those acting on a sulfur group of donors with a disulfide as acceptor. The systematic name of this enzyme class is CoA:glutathione-disulfide oxidoreductase. Other names in common use include glutathione-coenzyme A glutathione disulfide transhydrogenase, glutathione-coenzyme A glutathione disulfide transhydrogenase, glutathione coenzyme A-glutathione transhydrogenase, glutathione:coenzyme A-glutathione transhydrogenase, coenzyme A:oxidized-glutathione oxidoreductase, and coenzyme A:glutathione-disulfide oxidoreductase. This enzyme participates in cysteine metabolism and glutathione metabolism.
