= NAD(P) transhydrogenase, mitochondrial =

Protein-coding gene in the species Homo sapiens

NNT
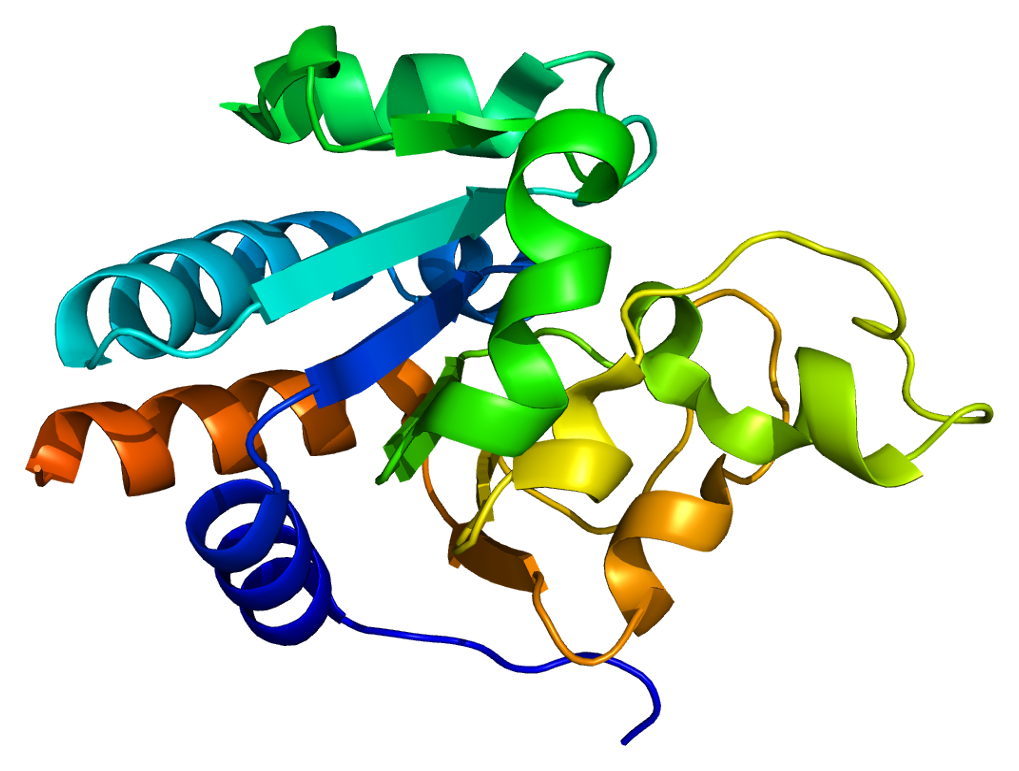

Identifiers
- Aliases: NNT, GCCD4, nicotinamide nucleotide transhydrogenase
- External IDs: OMIM: 607878; MGI: 109279; GeneCards: NNT
Available structures
PDB	Ortholog search: PDBe RCSB
PDB	List of PDB id codes 1DJL, 1PT9, 1U31
Enzyme activity
EC #	BRENDA	ExPASy	KEGG	MetaCyc
7.1.1.1	↗	↗	↗	↗

Gene location (Human)
Chr.	Chromosome 5 (human)
Band	5p12	Start	43,602,692 bp
Band	5p12	End	43,707,405 bp

Gene location (Mouse)
Chr.	Chromosome 13 (mouse)
Band	13 D2.3|13 67.21 cM	Start	119,471,984 bp
Band	13 D2.3|13 67.21 cM	End	119,545,533 bp
RNA expression pattern
Bgee	Human / Mouse (ortholog); Top expressed in: right ventricle; muscle of thigh; biceps brachii; thoracic diaphragm; left ventricle; right auricle of heart; Skeletal muscle tissue of biceps brachii; Skeletal muscle tissue of rectus abdominis; gastrocnemius muscle; vastus lateralis muscle / Top expressed in: right kidney; granulocyte; muscle of thigh; tail of embryo; ventricular zone; genital tubercle; yolk sac; urethra; embryo; neural tube; More reference expression data
BioGPS	n/a
Gene ontology
Molecular function	oxidoreductase activity; NAD binding; NAD(P)+ transhydrogenase (AB-specific) activity; NAD(P)+ transhydrogenase (B-specific) activity; NAD(P)+ transhydrogenase activity; NADP binding
Cellular component	integral component of membrane; mitochondrial inner membrane; membrane; mitochondrion; mitochondrial respirasome
Biological process	reactive oxygen species metabolic process; tricarboxylic acid cycle; NADPH regeneration; proton transmembrane transport; negative regulation of protein phosphorylation; positive regulation of mitochondrial membrane potential; oxygen homeostasis; response to vitamin; negative regulation of apoptotic process; cell redox homeostasis; cellular oxidant detoxification; positive regulation of hydrogen peroxide catabolic process
Sources:Amigo / QuickGO
Orthologs
Databases	NCBI: entry; OMA: entry
Species	Human	Mouse
Entrez	23530	18115
Ensembl	ENSG00000112992	ENSMUSG00000025453
UniProt	Q13423	Q61941
RefSeq (mRNA)	NM_012343; NM_182977; NM_001331026	NM_008710; NM_001308506
RefSeq (protein)	NP_001317955; NP_036475; NP_892022	n/a
Location (UCSC)	Chr 5: 43.6 – 43.71 Mb	Chr 13: 119.47 – 119.55 Mb
PubMed search
- Wikidata
View/Edit Human	View/Edit Mouse

NAD(P) transhydrogenase, mitochondrial is an enzyme that in humans is encoded by the NNT gene on chromosome 5.

The NNT gene contains 26 exons and encodes a transhydrogenase (EC 7.1.1.1) protein that is ~109 kDa in molecular weight and is involved in antioxidant defense in the mitochondria. Two alternatively spliced variants, encoding the same protein, have been found for this gene.

The C57BL/6J mouse strain used as an animal model in diabetes research has been shown via QTL analysis to contain mutations in the Nnt gene.

== Structure ==
Transhydrogenases including NNT can exist in an ‘open’ conformation, where substrates can bind and products can dissociate, in which the dihydronicotinamide and nicotinamide rings are held apart to block hydride transfer. It can exist in an ‘occluded’ conformation, where the substrates are moved into apposition to permit redox chemistry. The protein comprises three subunits (dI, dII and dIII), with the dII component spanning the inner mitochondrial membrane. X-ray crystallography structure of the protein shows that proton pumping is probably coupled to changes in the binding affinities of dIII for NADP(+) and NADPH. The first betaalphabetaalphabeta motif of dIII contains a Gly-X-Gly-X-X-Ala/Val fingerprint, whereas the nicotinamide ring of NADP(+) is located on a ridge where it can interact with NADH on the dI subunit.

== Function ==
NAD(P) transhydrogenase, mitochondrial is an integral protein of the inner mitochondrial membrane. The enzyme couples hydride transfer of reducing equivalent between NAD(H) and NADP(+) to proton translocation across the inner mitochondrial membrane. Under most physiological conditions, the enzyme uses energy from the mitochondrial proton gradient to produce high concentrations of NADPH. The resulting NADPH is used for biosynthesis as well as in reactions inside the mitochondria required to remove reactive oxygen species such as to retain a reduced glutathione pool (high GSH/GSSG ratio). The enzyme may be inactivated by oxidative modifications.

Reaction catalyzed:

- NADPH + NAD+ = NADP+ + NADH.

== Clinical significance ==
NAD(P) transhydrogenase, mitochondrial abundance may be associated with human heart failure. In failing hearts, a partial loss of NAD(P) transhydrogenase's mitochondrial activity negatively impacts the NADPH-dependent enzyme activities in the mitochondria and the capacity of mitochondria to maintain proton gradients, which may adversely impact energy production and oxidative stress defense in heart failure and exacerbate oxidative damage to cellular proteins.

Mutations in the NNT gene have been associated to familial glucocorticoid deficiency 1, a severe autosomal recessive disorder in human characterized by insensitivity to adrenocorticotropic hormone action on the adrenal cortex and an inability of the adrenal cortex to produce cortisol Glucocorticoid deficiency 1 usually presents in neonatal to early childhood with episodes of hypoglycemia and other symptoms related to cortisol deficiency, including failure to thrive, recurrent illnesses or infections, convulsions, and shock. Diagnosis is confirmed with a low plasma cortisol measurement in the presence of an elevated adrenocorticotropic hormone level, and normal aldosterone and plasma renin measurements.
