= Proton-Translocating NAD(P)+ Transhydrogenase =

Proton Translocating NAD(P)^{+} Transhydrogenase
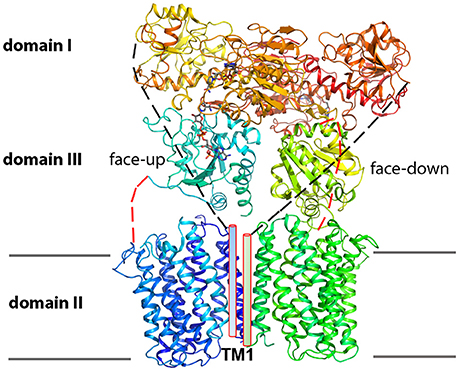
- Cartoon architecture of the holo-Transhydrogenase dimer showing the three conserved domains.

Identifiers
- EC no.: 7.1.1.1

Databases
- BRENDA: enzyme data
- ExPASy: NiceZyme view
- KEGG: enzyme entry
- MetaCyc: metabolic pathway
- Rhea: reactions
- PDB structures: RCSB PDB PDBe PDBsum
- Gene Ontology: AmiGO / QuickGO
Search
- PMC: articles
- PubMed: articles
- NCBI: proteins

Proton-Translocating NAD(P)^{+} Transhydrogenase (E.C. 7.1.1.1) is an enzyme in that catalyzes the translocation of hydrons that are connected to the redox reaction

NADH + NADP^{+} + H^{+}_{outside} => NAD^{+} + NADPH + H^{+}_{inside}

In humans, this enzyme is encoded by the gene NNT.

== EC Number 7.1.1.1 ==
EC 7 – Translocases are a grouping of enzymes with a common function of assisting to move a molecule, typically across a membrane.

EC 7.1 – enzymes that catalyze translocation of hydrons (the positive cations of all hydrogen isotopes e.g. protons, deuterons, tritons)

EC 7.1.1 – enzymes that catalyze translocation of hydrons that have a tie to oxidoreductase reactions

EC 7.1.1.1 – proton-translocating NAD(P)^{+} transhydrogenase.

== Reaction pathway ==
The reaction that this enzyme catalyzes is

NADH + NADP^{+} + H^{+}_{outside} => NAD^{+} + NADPH + H^{+}_{inside}

This redox reaction is a transfer of hydride equivalents from NADH to NADP^{+} coupled to a translocation of protons across a membrane. NADP^{+} is reduced to NADPH by NADH, which is oxidized into NAD^{+}. This reduction is tied to the inward translocation of protons across a membrane. This process is not necessarily coupled, but is found coupled in nature.

== Known organisms and locations ==
The transhydrogenase is found in the inner mitochondrial membranes of vertebrates other than fish. Although absent from Saccharomyces cerevisiae, it occurs in algae such as Acetabularia acetabulum, as well as in the cytosolic membrane of many bacteria, including Escherichia coli. In E. coli the enzyme provides an estimated 35-45% of cytosolic NADPH under standard growth conditions. We use E. coli as a model organism to study the enzyme's structure and function.

== Description of known crystal structures/active sites ==
The structure of proton-translocating NADP(+) transhydrogenase has been shown to vary between organisms. The structures of the enzyme share an architecture with 3 known domains, dI, dII, dIII, but differ on exact structure and makeup of these domains. Humans have a single polypeptide chain that forms all three domains. Bacteria are split into two main groups. Some are similar to E. coli, which have two subunits, α and β. Other bacteria have a similar β subunit, while their α subunit is split into two so that the dI domain is its own polypeptide. These three domains form a heterotrimer, with both dI and dIII in the cytosolic space and connected to dII. The heterotrimer forms a dimer, with dI as the dimerization unit

=== dII ===
The domain II (dII) is around 400 residues and spans across the membrane forming a channel for protons. It has 13 α-helices comprising its transmembrane domain. Since both ends of the dII domain are on the cytosolic side of the membrane, an even number of helices would make more sense, structurally. The current prediction as to why an odd number of helices exists in dII is that the α and β subunits have another helix that connects their C and N termini. dII also has few conserved residues and shorter loops on the periplasmic side of the transmembrane domain, while the cytosolic side has highly conserved and longer loops.

=== dI ===
Domain dI is about 400 residues long and protrudes into the cytosolic space with a binding site for NAD(H). When crystallized in its dimerized form (a homodimer), dI has several subdomains, including the binding site for NAD(H). Two subdomains in particular, dI1 and dI2 both contain a Rossmann fold, which is made of a 6-stranded parallel β-sheet surrounded by α-helices, and are connected by two longer α-helices. The C termini of the two dI monomers forms the substrate-binding cleft for NAD(H).

=== dIII ===
Domain dIII is about 200 residues long and also protrudes into the cytosolic space, where it has a binding site for NADP(H). Similar to dI, dIII comprises a Rossmann fold. When in the complete heterotrimer, dIII is thought to extend into the cleft of dI in order to bring their substrate-binding sites, and their substrates, closer together to allow an easier transfer of hydride ion from NADH to NADP^{+}. A high affinity for NADP(H) is evidenced by loop E, which acts as a lid to allow tighter bonding of the ligand via hydrogen bonding. There is also a fingerprint motif (Gly-X-Gly-X-X-Ala/Val) that increases specificity of the enzyme to bind to the proper substrate which is highly conserved. The link between dIII and dII is less rigid, and consists of a scattering of smaller polar residues as well as a helix D/loop D region that perpendicularly extends from the Rossmann fold.

== Structure tied to function ==
This enzyme’s structure is tied to its function heavily. The transmembrane domain in dII formed by alpha helices lends itself well to its function as a proton channel across a membrane. The lid and fingerprint motifs used by dIII to increase affinity to NADP(H) are also examples of its structure being tied to function. In addition, the ridge of dIII fitting into the cleft of dI shows that even the structure of the dI/dIII dimer is helpful in moving their two substrates closer together to allow hydride transfer.

Since this enzyme exists in multiple organisms, it is possible to look at multiple orthologs of this enzyme. Their structures are not identical, but most are highly similar, and all share the same architecture and domains. This all shows that the structure of this enzyme is closely connected to its role in reduction of NADP^{+}.

== Enzyme functions in the cell ==
NADPH is used as a reducing agent in many anabolic reactions. Proton translocating NAD(P)^{+} transhydrogenase is one of the main ways that cells can regenerate NADPH after it is used. In E. coli, this pathway contribute equal amounts of NADPH as the pentose phosphate pathway, and both were the main producers of NADPH under standard growth conditions.

NADP(H) and NAD(H) are equal and opposite contributors to metabolism, and this enzyme is necessary to keep a balance between the two. It can also function to generate a proton gradient across a membrane, as it is a reversible reaction, and is used as such in certain organisms.

“It can contribute to NADPH formation for bio-synthesis and glutathione reduction, in the regulation of flux through the tricarboxylic acid cycle, and, operating in reverse in some invertebrates, it can transfer reducing power from NADPH to NAD^{+} to fuel an anaerobic respiratory chain.” – J. Baz Jackson, Sarah J. Peake, and Scott A. White on the role of proton translocating NAD(P)^{+} transhydrogenase in the cell.
