= Nicotinamide adenine dinucleotide phosphate =

Coenzyme

Names
- IUPAC name 2'-O-Phosphonoadenosine 5'-{3-[1-(3-carbamoylpyridinio)-1,4-anhydro-D-ribitol-5-yl] hydrogen diphosphate}

Identifiers
CAS Number	53-55-8
3D model (JSmol)	Interactive image
ChEBI	CHEBI:44409
ChEMBL	ChEMBL2364573
ChemSpider	5674
ECHA InfoCard	100.000.163
MeSH	NADP
PubChem CID	5885
UNII	BY8P107XEP
- InChI: InChI=1S/C21H28N7O17P3/c22-17-12-19(25-7-24-17)28(8-26-12)21-16(44-46(33,34)35)14(30)11(43-21)6-41-48(38,39)45-47(36,37)40-5-10-13(29)15(31)20(42-10)27-3-1-2-9(4-27)18(23)32/h1-4,7-8,10-11,13-16,20-21,29-31H,5-6H2,(H7-,22,23,24,25,32,33,34,35,36,37,38,39)/t10-,11-,13-,14-,15-,16-,20-,21-/m1/s1 Key: XJLXINKUBYWONI-NNYOXOHSSA-N; InChI=1/C21H28N7O17P3/c22-17-12-19(25-7-24-17)28(8-26-12)21-16(44-46(33,34)35)14(30)11(43-21)6-41-48(38,39)45-47(36,37)40-5-10-13(29)15(31)20(42-10)27-3-1-2-9(4-27)18(23)32/h1-4,7-8,10-11,13-16,20-21,29-31H,5-6H2,(H7-,22,23,24,25,32,33,34,35,36,37,38,39)/t10-,11-,13-,14-,15-,16-,20-,21-/m1/s1 Key: XJLXINKUBYWONI-NNYOXOHSBN
- SMILES: O=C(N)c1ccc[n+](c1)[C@H]2[C@H](O)[C@H](O)[C@H](O2)COP([O-])(=O)OP(=O)(O)OC[C@H]3O[C@@H](n4cnc5c4ncnc5N)[C@@H]([C@@H]3O)OP(=O)(O)O

Properties
Chemical formula	C_{21}H_{28}N_{7}O_{17}P_{3}^{+} (oxidized); C_{21}H_{29}N_{7}O_{17}P_{3} (reduced)
Molar mass	744.4 g/mol (oxidized); 745.4 g/mol (reduced)
- Except where otherwise noted, data are given for materials in their standard state (at 25 °C [77 °F], 100 kPa). verify (what is ?) Infobox references

Nicotinamide adenine dinucleotide phosphate, abbreviated NADP+, is a cofactor used in anabolic reactions, such as the Calvin cycle and lipid and nucleic acid syntheses, which require it as a reducing agent ('hydrogen source'). NADPH is the reduced form, whereas NADP^{+} is the oxidized form. The reduced form, NADPH is used by all forms of cellular life as an electron donor as part of many biosynthetic reactions.

NADP^{+} differs from NAD^{+} by the presence of an additional phosphate group on the 2' position of the ribose ring that carries the adenine moiety. This extra phosphate is added by NAD^{+} kinase and removed by NADP^{+} phosphatase. As cofactors for enzyme reactions in mammals, NAD^{+} and NADPH are typically the active forms (outside of oxidative phosphorylation). NAD^{+} participates in oxidative (and usually catabolic) reactions, while NADPH participates in reductive (and usually anabolic) reactions.

== Biosynthesis ==
=== NADP^{+} ===
In general, NADP^{+} is synthesized before NADPH is. Such a reaction usually starts with NAD^{+} from either the de-novo or the salvage pathway, with NAD^{+} kinase adding the extra phosphate group. ADP-ribosyl cyclase allows for synthesis from nicotinamide in the salvage pathway, and NADP^{+} phosphatase can convert NADPH back to NADH to maintain a balance. Some forms of the NAD^{+} kinase, notably the one in mitochondria, can also accept NADH to turn it directly into NADPH. The prokaryotic pathway is less well understood, but with all the similar proteins the process should work in a similar way.

=== NADPH ===
NADPH is produced from NADP^{+}. The major source of NADPH in animals and other non-photosynthetic organisms is the pentose phosphate pathway, by glucose-6-phosphate dehydrogenase (G6PDH) in the first step. The pentose phosphate pathway also produces pentose, another important part of NAD(P)H, from glucose. Some bacteria also use G6PDH for the Entner–Doudoroff pathway, but NADPH production remains the same.

Ferredoxin–NADP^{+} reductase, present in all domains of life, is a major source of NADPH in photosynthetic organisms including plants and cyanobacteria. It appears in the last step of the electron chain of the light reactions of photosynthesis. It is used as reducing power for the biosynthetic reactions in the Calvin cycle to assimilate carbon dioxide and help turn the carbon dioxide into glucose. It has functions in accepting electrons in other non-photosynthetic pathways as well: it is needed in the reduction of nitrate into ammonia for plant assimilation in nitrogen cycle and in the production of oils.

There are several other lesser-known mechanisms of generating NADPH, all of which depend on the presence of mitochondria in eukaryotes. The key enzymes in these carbon-metabolism-related processes are NADP-linked isoforms of malic enzyme, isocitrate dehydrogenase (IDH), and glutamate dehydrogenase. In these reactions, NADP^{+} acts like NAD^{+} in other enzymes as an oxidizing agent. The isocitrate dehydrogenase mechanism appears to be the major source of NADPH in fat and possibly also liver cells. These processes are also found in bacteria. Bacteria can also use a NADP-dependent glyceraldehyde 3-phosphate dehydrogenase for the same purpose. Like the pentose phosphate pathway, these pathways are related to parts of glycolysis. Another carbon metabolism-related pathway involved in the generation of NADPH is the mitochondrial folate cycle, which uses principally serine as a source of one-carbon units to sustain nucleotide synthesis and redox homeostasis in mitochondria. Mitochondrial folate cycle has been recently suggested as the principal contributor to NADPH generation in mitochondria of cancer cells.

NADPH can also be generated through pathways unrelated to carbon metabolism. The ferredoxin reductase is such an example. Nicotinamide nucleotide transhydrogenase transfers the hydrogen between NAD(P)H and NAD(P)^{+}, and is found in eukaryotic mitochondria and many bacteria. There are versions that depend on a proton gradient to work and ones that do not. Some anaerobic organisms use NADP^{+}-linked hydrogenase, ripping a hydride from hydrogen gas to produce a proton and NADPH.

Like NADH, NADPH is fluorescent. NADPH in aqueous solution excited at the nicotinamide absorbance of ~335 nm (near UV) has a fluorescence emission which peaks at 445-460 nm (violet to blue). NADP^{+} has no appreciable fluorescence.

== Function ==
NADPH provides the reducing agents, usually hydrogen atoms, for biosynthetic reactions and the oxidation-reduction involved in protecting against the toxicity of reactive oxygen species (ROS), allowing the regeneration of glutathione (GSH). NADPH is also used for anabolic pathways, such as cholesterol synthesis, steroid synthesis, ascorbic acid synthesis, xylitol synthesis, cytosolic fatty acid synthesis and microsomal fatty acid chain elongation.

The NADPH system is also responsible for generating free radicals in immune cells by NADPH oxidase. These radicals are used to destroy pathogens in a process termed the respiratory burst. It is the source of reducing equivalents for cytochrome P450 hydroxylation of aromatic compounds, steroids, alcohols, and drugs.

== Stability ==
NADH and NADPH are very stable in basic solutions, but NAD^{+} and NADP^{+} are degraded in basic solutions into a fluorescent product that can be used conveniently for quantitation. Conversely, NADPH and NADH are degraded by acidic solutions while NAD^{+}/NADP^{+} are fairly stable to acid.

== Enzymes that use NADP(H) as a coenzyme ==
Many enzymes that bind NADP share a common super-secondary structure named the "Rossmann fold". The initial beta-alpha-beta (βαβ) fold is the most conserved segment of the Rossmann folds. This segment is in contact with the ADP portion of NADP. Therefore, it is also called an "ADP-binding βαβ fold".

- Adrenodoxin reductase: This enzyme is present ubiquitously in most organisms. It transfers two electrons from NADPH to FAD. In vertebrates, it serves as the first enzyme in the chain of mitochondrial P450 systems that synthesize steroid hormones.

== Enzymes that use NADP(H) as a substrate ==
In 2018 and 2019, the first two reports of enzymes that catalyze the removal of the 2' phosphate of NADP(H) in eukaryotes emerged. First the cytoplasmic protein MESH1 (Q8N4P3), then the mitochondrial protein nocturnin were reported. Of note, the structures and NADPH binding of MESH1 (5VXA) and nocturnin (6NF0) are not related.

Ball-and-stick models of NADP^{+} and NADPH
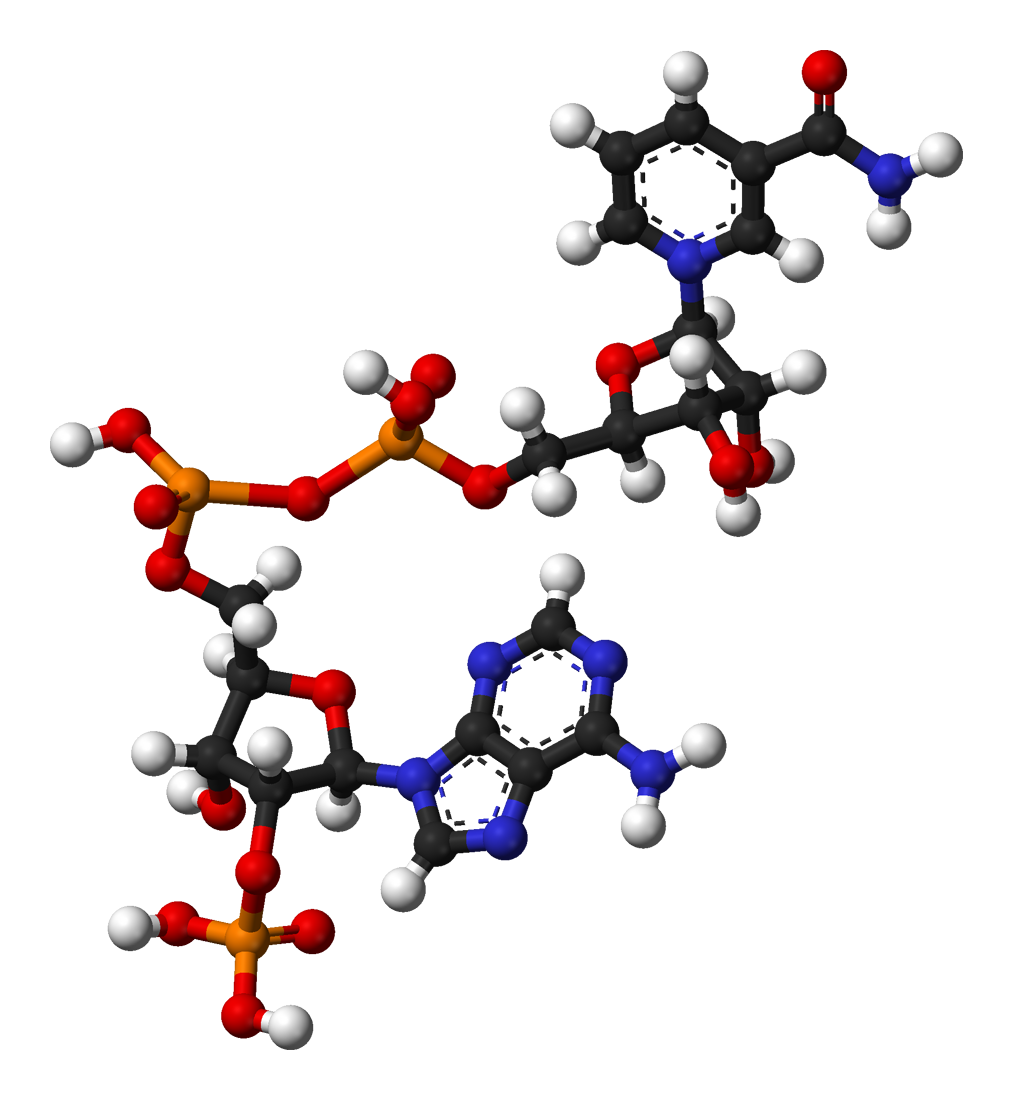
NADP^{+}

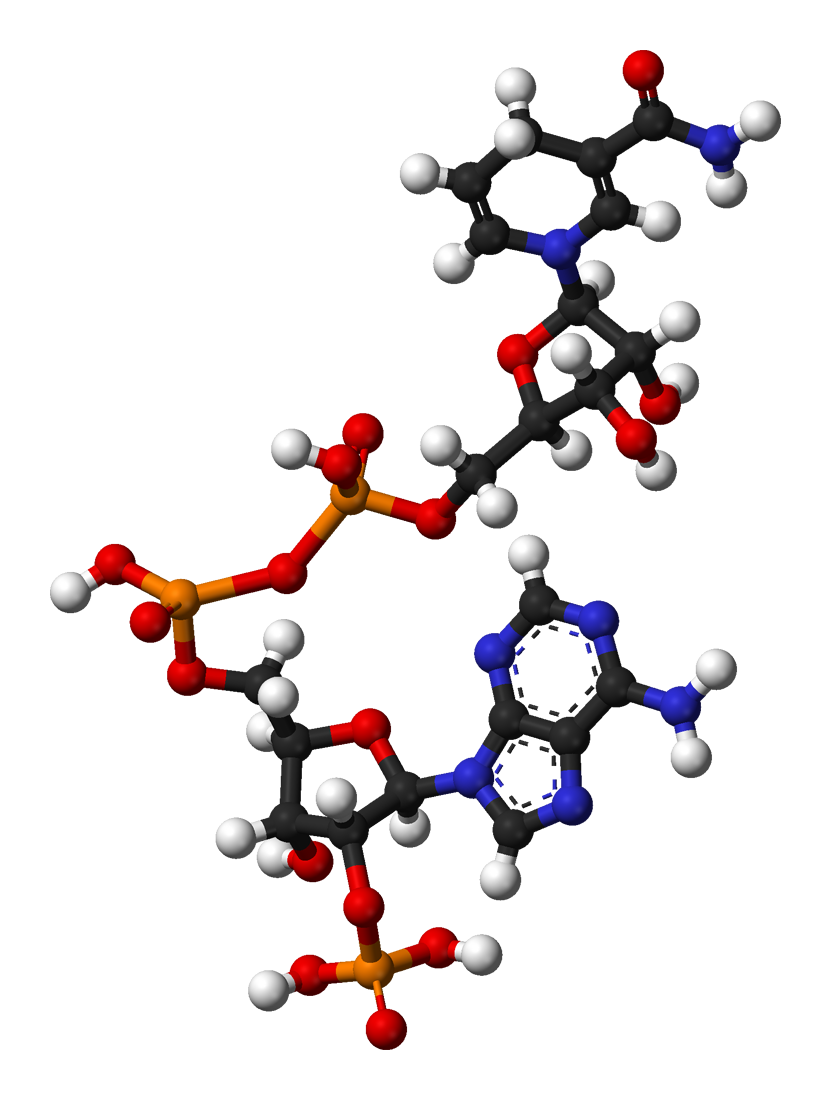
NADPH
