= NAD(P)+ transhydrogenase (Si-specific) =

NAD(P)^{+} transhydrogenase (Si-specific)

Identifiers
- EC no.: 1.6.1.1
- CAS no.: 9014-18-0

Databases
- BRENDA: enzyme data
- ExPASy: NiceZyme view
- KEGG: enzyme entry
- MetaCyc: metabolic pathway
- Rhea: reactions
- PDB structures: RCSB PDB PDBe PDBsum
- Gene Ontology: AmiGO / QuickGO
Search
- PMC: articles
- PubMed: articles
- NCBI: proteins

In biochemistry, NAD(P)^{+} transhydrogenase (Si-specific) (EC 1.6.1.1) is an enzyme that catalyzes the chemical reaction

NADPH + NAD^{+} $\rightleftharpoons$ NADP^{+} + NADH

Thus, the two substrates of this enzyme are NADPH and NAD^{+}, whereas its two products are NADP^{+} and NADH. This enzyme participates in nicotinate and nicotinamide metabolism. It employs one cofactor, FAD.

== Physiological function ==
Si-specific transhydrogenase is a soluble protein found in some Gammaproteobacteria and gram-positive bacteria. Enterobacteriaceae are known to possess both a soluble and a membrane-bound transhydrogenase. In living cells this enzyme primarily operates in the direction consuming NADPH and producing NADH, as the physiological ratio of NADPH/NADP^{+} is much higher than the ratio of NADH/NAD^{+}. Its chief function in vivo is the reoxidization of excess NADPH.

== Nomenclature ==
This enzyme belongs to the family of oxidoreductases, specifically those acting on NADH or NADPH with NAD+ or NADP+ as acceptor. The systematic name of this enzyme is NADPH:NAD+ oxidoreductase (Si-specific). Other names in common use include non-energy-linked transhydrogenase, NAD(P)+ transhydrogenase (B-specific), and soluble transhydrogenase.

Older literature often uses ambiguous names such as pyridine nucleotide transhydrogenase, transhydrogenase, NAD(P)+ transhydrogenase, nicotinamide nucleotide transhydrogenase, NADPH-NAD+ transhydrogenase, pyridine nucleotide transferase, or NADPH-NAD+ oxidoreductase, which can equally apply to the more common proton-translocating NAD(P)+ transhydrogenase.
