= NAD(P)+ transhydrogenase (Re/Si-specific) =

Enzyme class

NAD(P) transhydrogenase
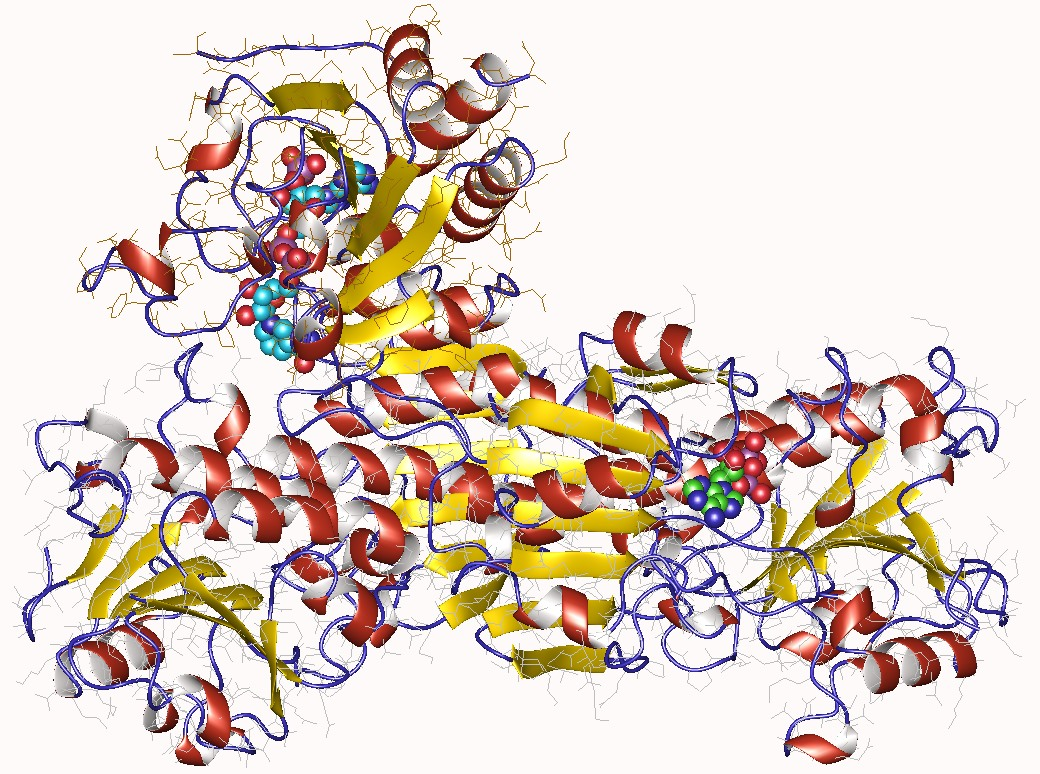
- NAD(P) transhydrogenase heterotrimer, Rhodospirillum rubrum

Identifiers
- Symbol: ?
- Pfam: PF02233
- TCDB: 3.D.2
- OPM superfamily: 410
- OPM protein: 4o9u
Available protein structures:
- Pfam: structures / ECOD
- PDB: RCSB PDB; PDBe; PDBj
- PDBsum: structure summary

NAD(P)^{+} transhydrogenase (Re/Si-specific

Identifiers
- EC no.: 1.6.1.2
- CAS no.: 9014-18-0

Databases
- IntEnz: IntEnz view
- BRENDA: BRENDA entry
- ExPASy: NiceZyme view
- KEGG: KEGG entry
- MetaCyc: metabolic pathway
- PRIAM: profile
- PDB structures: RCSB PDB PDBe PDBsum
- Gene Ontology: AmiGO / QuickGO
Search
- PMC: articles
- PubMed: articles
- NCBI: proteins

In enzymology, a NAD(P)^{+} transhydrogenase (Re/Si-specific (EC 1.6.1.2) is an enzyme that catalyzes the chemical reaction

NADPH + NAD^{+} $\rightleftharpoons$ NADP^{+} + NADH

Thus, the two substrates of this enzyme are NADPH and NAD^{+}, whereas its two products are NADP^{+} and NADH.

This enzyme belongs to the family of oxidoreductases, specifically those acting on NADH or NADPH with NAD+ or NADP+ as acceptor. This enzyme participates in nicotinate and nicotinamide metabolism.

== Nomenclature ==
The systematic name of this enzyme class is NADPH:NAD+ oxidoreductase (Re/Si-specific). Other names in common use include pyridine nucleotide transhydrogenase, transhydrogenase, NAD(P)+ transhydrogenase, nicotinamide adenine dinucleotide (phosphate) transhydrogenase, NAD+ transhydrogenase, NADH transhydrogenase, nicotinamide nucleotide transhydrogenase, NADPH-NAD+ transhydrogenase, pyridine nucleotide transferase, NADPH-NAD+ oxidoreductase, NADH-NADP+-transhydrogenase, NADPH:NAD+ transhydrogenase, H+-Thase, energy-linked transhydrogenase, and NAD(P)+ transhydrogenase (AB-specific).
