= Hydrazine synthase =

Hydrazine synthase is a key enzyme that facilitates the synthesis of hydrazine, and intermediate in the anammox pathway. The enzyme utilizes spatial separation between the α, β, and γ subunits of its dimer crystal structure to undergo the half reactions involved in hydrazine synthesis. Organisms that contain this enzyme are monophyletic bacteria found in low oxygen environments.

== Classification and metabolism ==
Per its classification, hydrazine synthase (EC 1.7.2.7) is a nitrogen (N) based oxidoreductase enzyme meaning it is involved in an oxidation/reduction mechanism between N containing molecules or "species". The oxidation of ammonia (NH_{3}) attributed to hydrazine synthase is part of a larger, multistep metabolic process called anammox which stands for "anaerobic oxidation of ammonia" where nitrite (NO_{2}^{-}) and NH_{3} react to form dinitrogen gas (N_{2}). Specifically, hydrazine synthase facilitates two half reactions within the larger metabolic process during which nitric oxide (NO) is first reduced to hydroxylamine (NH_{2}OH) with electrons via the cytrochrome complex. These electrons are accepted from menaquinole, an anaerobically reduced form of vitamin K_{2}. This NO reduction reaction is the more thermodynamically favorable of the half reactions. The subsequent reaction is the rate limiting step (relatively unfavorable) and involves the combination of NH_{2}OH and neutral NH_{3} to synthesize hydrazine (N_{2}H_{2}). Neutrality is relevant for NH_{3} since it can oscillate between its charged, ammonium (NH_{4}^{+}) and uncharged forms while maintaining the same oxidation state. Ammonia must be neutral in order for the proton transfer in the second reaction step to progress and to produce N_{2}H_{2}. Here, the available lone pair of electrons in NH_{3} is donated to the N in NH_{2}OH and replaced with free H^{+}. The second half reaction is an example of "comproportionation" where two species of more extreme oxidation states (NH_{3} and NH_{2}OH) react to create a species of more intermediate oxidation state (N_{2}H_{4}). Hydrazine is a highly unstable nitrogen species and is therefore often synthetically utilized as a fuel source for powerful machinery like rockets.

NO^{−}_{2} → NO

NO + 3 H^{+} + 3 e^{−} → NH_{2}OH (half reaction 1; ΔG = -45.8 kcal/mol)

NH_{2}OH + NH_{3} → N_{2}H_{4} + H_{2}O (half reaction 2; ΔG = 22.1 kcal/mol)

N_{2}H_{4} → N_{2} + 4 H^{+} + 4e^{−}

== Known crystal structures ==
Hydrazine synthase contains α, β, and γ subunits within the protein complex. It is a dimer of heterotrimers so that each component contains all subunits. The α subunits are central to the enzyme complex so that the α subunit of each dimer component are in direct contact. Beta and γ subunits are paired oppositely between dimer components on either side of the α subunits. The cytochrome binding site is part of the γ subunit and utilizes calcium (Ca^{2+}). The α and γ subunits contain two haem groups each (αI and αII and γI and γII, respectively) which contain additional trace metals, zinc (Zn^{2+}) and iron (Fe). Within the α subunit, haem αI is in the middle domain while αII is in the C-terminal domain. The N-terminal of the α subunit and the entire β subunit exist in a beta-propeller form with 6 and 7 blades, respectively.

== Active site ==
The active sites of hydrazine synthase are separated by half reactions in the α and γ subunits and connected via a tunnel. Hydroxylamine synthesis (half reaction 1) occurs in the γI active site and then NH_{2}OH is transferred to the active site in the α subunit. Haem αI polarizes the N-O bond in NH_{2}OH using Fe to hinder its ability as a competitive catalase inhibitor, thus making this metabolic pathway "haem dependent".

== Tying structure to function ==
The αI haem is unique in hydrazine synthase as its primary histidine utilizes Zn^{2+} rather than Fe which resembles the active site in alcohol dehydrogenase and in turn, conserves a tyrosine amino acid. this active site, being hydrophobic, also ensures that NH_{3} is neutral before entering into the reaction. Generally, the spatial separation between subunits guides the divided half reaction stages within the overarching metabolism. Finally, although the β subunit does not contain an active site to facilitate the chemical reaction in hydrazine synthesis, it may be used to facilitate the physical transfer of species between reaction.

== Associated organisms ==
This enzyme can be found in anammox bacteria which are monophyletic and part of the order Brocadiales. Some examples include Brocadia, Kuenenia, Scalindua, Anammoxoglobus, and Jettenia. In general, anammox bacteria containing hydrazine synthase can be found in a variety of ecosystems with anoxic zones.

== Tying enzyme function to larger cellular metabolism ==
Like many membrane bound metabolisms, the electrons produced in oxidizing NH_{3} create a charge gradient across the membrane which ultimately drive ATP synthesis for cellular energy. For this particular metabolism, the membrane is of a specialized anammox organelle called an anammoxosome. Hydrazine synthase functions without oxygen as does the entire metabolism. Additionally, another enzyme involved in a different step of the anammox pathway produces electrons that are used for carbon fixation and the acetyl-CoA pathway.
