= 1,2-dihydroxynaphthalene dioxygenase =

Class of enzymes

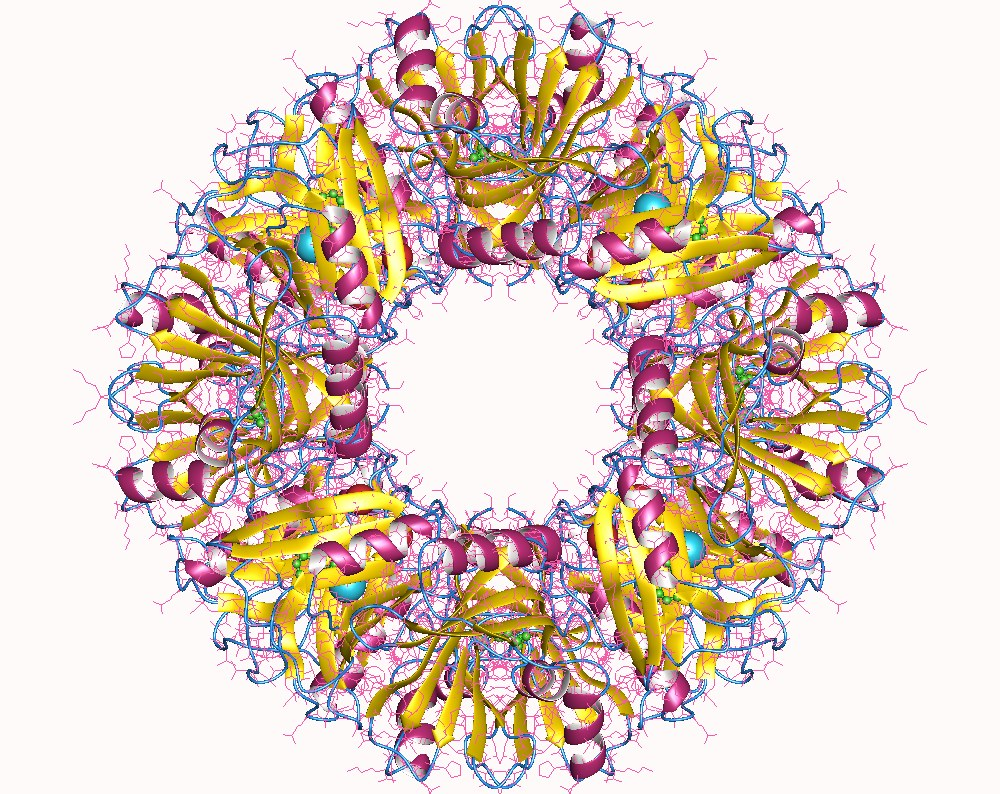
- 1,2-dihydroxynaphthalene dioxygenase oktamer, Pseudomonas

Identifiers
- EC no.: 1.13.11.56

Databases
- IntEnz: IntEnz view
- BRENDA: BRENDA entry
- ExPASy: NiceZyme view
- KEGG: KEGG entry
- MetaCyc: metabolic pathway
- PRIAM: profile
- PDB structures: RCSB PDB PDBe PDBsum
Search
- PMC: articles
- PubMed: articles
- NCBI: proteins

1,2-dihydroxynaphthalene dioxygenase (EC 1.13.11.56, 1,2-DHN dioxygenase, DHNDO, 1,2-dihydroxynaphthalene oxygenase, 1,2-dihydroxynaphthalene:oxygen oxidoreductase) is an enzyme with systematic name naphthalene-1,2-diol:oxygen oxidoreductase. This enzyme catalyses the following chemical reaction

1,2-naphthalenediol
O_{2}
2-hydroxychromene-2-carboxylic acid

It is involved in naphthalene degradation in Pseudomonads.
