= Chloridazon-catechol dioxygenase =

Class of enzymes

chloridazon-catechol dioxygenase

Identifiers
- EC no.: 1.13.11.36
- CAS no.: 82869-32-7

Databases
- IntEnz: IntEnz view
- BRENDA: BRENDA entry
- ExPASy: NiceZyme view
- KEGG: KEGG entry
- MetaCyc: metabolic pathway
- PRIAM: profile
- PDB structures: RCSB PDB PDBe PDBsum
- Gene Ontology: AmiGO / QuickGO
Search
- PMC: articles
- PubMed: articles
- NCBI: proteins

Chloridazon-catechol dioxygenase (EC 1.13.11.36) is an enzyme that catalyzes the chemical reaction

5-amino-4-chloro-2-(2,3-dihydroxyphenyl)-3(2H)-pyridazinone + O_{2} $\rightleftharpoons$ 5-amino-4-chloro-2-(2-hydroxymuconoyl)-3(2H)-pyridazinone

Thus, the two substrates of this enzyme are 5-amino-4-chloro-2-(2,3-dihydroxyphenyl)-3(2H)-pyridazinone and oxygen, whereas its product is 5-amino-4-chloro-2-(2-hydroxymuconoyl)-3(2H)-pyridazinone.

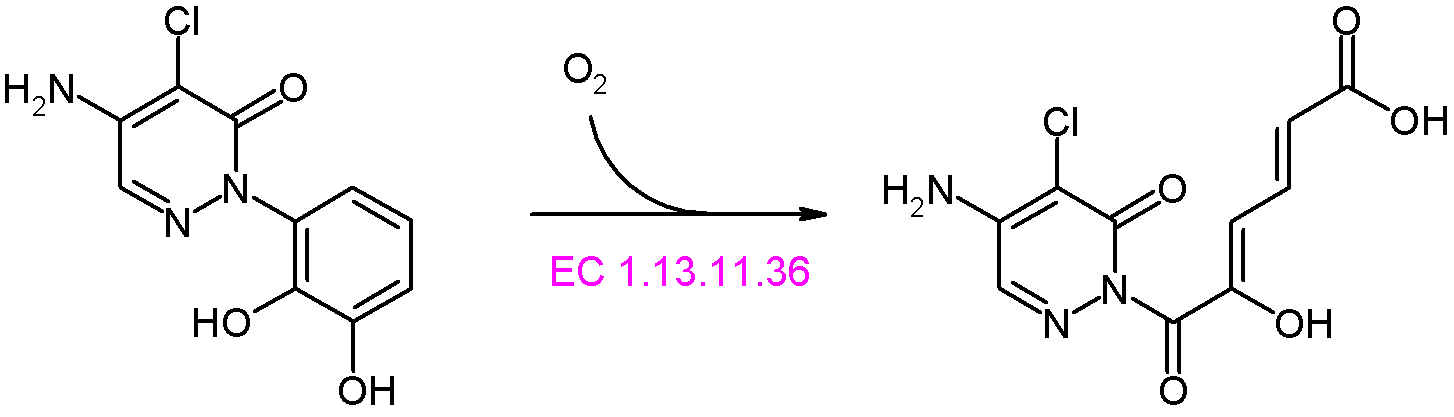

This enzyme belongs to the family of oxidoreductases, specifically those acting on single donors with O_{2} as oxidant and incorporation of two atoms of oxygen into the substrate (oxygenases). The oxygen incorporated need not be derived from O_{2}. The systematic name of this enzyme class is 5-amino-4-chloro-2-(2,3-dihydroxyphenyl)-3(2H)-pyridazinone 1,2-oxidoreductase (decyclizing). It employs one cofactor, iron.
