= 21-hydroxysteroid dehydrogenase (NADP+) =

Enzyme

21-hydroxysteroid dehydrogenase (NADP^{+})

Identifiers
- EC no.: 1.1.1.151
- CAS no.: 37250-76-3

Databases
- IntEnz: IntEnz view
- BRENDA: BRENDA entry
- ExPASy: NiceZyme view
- KEGG: KEGG entry
- MetaCyc: metabolic pathway
- PRIAM: profile
- PDB structures: RCSB PDB PDBe PDBsum
- Gene Ontology: AmiGO / QuickGO
Search
- PMC: articles
- PubMed: articles
- NCBI: proteins

In enzymology, 21-hydroxysteroid dehydrogenase (NADP^{+}) (EC 1.1.1.151) is an enzyme that catalyzes the chemical reaction

(5β)-pregnan-21-ol
+ NADP^{+}
H^{+}
H^{+}
(5β)-pregnan-21-al
+ NADPH

The two substrates of this enzyme are (5β)-pregnan-21-ol and oxidised nicotinamide adenine dinucleotide phosphate (NADP^{+}). Its products are (5β)-pregnan-21-al, reduced NADPH, and a proton.

This enzyme belongs to the family of oxidoreductases, specifically those acting on the CH-OH group of donor with NAD^{+} or NADP^{+} as acceptor. The systematic name of this enzyme class is 21-hydroxysteroid:NADP^{+} 21-oxidoreductase. Other names in common use include 21-hydroxy steroid dehydrogenase, 21-hydroxy steroid (nicotinamide adenine dinucleotide phosphate), dehydrogenase, 21-hydroxy steroid dehydrogenase (nicotinamide adenine dinucleotide, phosphate), NADP^{+}-21-hydroxysteroid dehydrogenase, and 21-hydroxysteroid dehydrogenase (NADP^{+}).

== See also ==
- 21-hydroxysteroid dehydrogenase (NAD+), an enzyme which catalyses the same reaction but using an alternative cofactor
