= 21-hydroxysteroid dehydrogenase (NAD+) =

Enzyme

21-hydroxysteroid dehydrogenase (NAD^{+})

Identifiers
- EC no.: 1.1.1.150
- CAS no.: 37250-75-2

Databases
- IntEnz: IntEnz view
- BRENDA: BRENDA entry
- ExPASy: NiceZyme view
- KEGG: KEGG entry
- MetaCyc: metabolic pathway
- PRIAM: profile
- PDB structures: RCSB PDB PDBe PDBsum
- Gene Ontology: AmiGO / QuickGO
Search
- PMC: articles
- PubMed: articles
- NCBI: proteins

In enzymology, 21-hydroxysteroid dehydrogenase (NAD^{+}) (EC 1.1.1.150) is an enzyme that catalyzes the chemical reaction

(5β)-pregnan-21-ol
+ NAD^{+}
H^{+}
H^{+}
(5β)-pregnan-21-al
+ NADH

The two substrates of this enzyme are (5β)-pregnan-21-ol and oxidised nicotinamide adenine dinucleotide (NAD^{+}). Its products are (5β)-pregnan-21-al, reduced NADH, and a proton.

This enzyme belongs to the family of oxidoreductases, specifically those acting on the CH-OH group of donor with NAD^{+} or NADP^{+} as acceptor. The systematic name of this enzyme class is 21-hydroxysteroid:NAD^{+} 21-oxidoreductase. This enzyme is also called 21-hydroxysteroid dehydrogenase (NAD^{+}).

== See also ==
- 21-hydroxysteroid dehydrogenase (NADP+), an enzyme which catalyses the same reaction but using an alternative cofactor
