= (S)-2-hydroxy-fatty-acid dehydrogenase =

Class of enzymes

Identifiers
- EC no.: 1.1.1.99
- CAS no.: 37250-33-2

Databases
- IntEnz: IntEnz view
- BRENDA: BRENDA entry
- ExPASy: NiceZyme view
- KEGG: KEGG entry
- MetaCyc: metabolic pathway
- PRIAM: profile
- PDB structures: RCSB PDB PDBe PDBsum
- Gene Ontology: AmiGO / QuickGO
Search
- PMC: articles
- PubMed: articles
- NCBI: proteins

In enzymology, (S)-2-hydroxy-fatty-acid dehydrogenase (EC 1.1.1.99) is an enzyme that catalyzes the chemical reaction.

(S)-2-hydroxystearic acid
+ NAD^{+}
H^{+}
H^{+}
2-oxostearic acid
+ NADH

The two substrates of this enzyme are (S)-2-hydroxystearic acid and oxidised nicotinamide adenine dinucleotide (NAD^{+}). Its products are 2-oxostearic acid, reduced NADH, and a proton.

This enzyme belongs to the family of oxidoreductases, specifically those acting on the CH-OH group of donor with NAD^{+} or NADP^{+} as acceptor. The systematic name of this enzyme class is (S)-2-hydroxystearate:NAD^{+} oxidoreductase. Other names in common use include dehydrogenase, L-2-hydroxy fatty acid, L-2-hydroxy fatty acid dehydrogenase, and 2-hydroxy fatty acid oxidase.

== See also ==
- (R)-2-hydroxy-fatty-acid dehydrogenase which acts on the enantiomer of the hydroxy acid.
