= (R)-2-hydroxy-fatty-acid dehydrogenase =

Class of enzymes

Identifiers
- EC no.: 1.1.1.98
- CAS no.: 37250-32-1

Databases
- IntEnz: IntEnz view
- BRENDA: BRENDA entry
- ExPASy: NiceZyme view
- KEGG: KEGG entry
- MetaCyc: metabolic pathway
- PRIAM: profile
- PDB structures: RCSB PDB PDBe PDBsum
- Gene Ontology: AmiGO / QuickGO
Search
- PMC: articles
- PubMed: articles
- NCBI: proteins

In enzymology, a (R)-2-hydroxy-fatty-acid dehydrogenase (EC 1.1.1.98) is an enzyme that catalyzes the chemical reaction

(R)-2-hydroxystearic acid
+ NAD^{+}
H^{+}
H^{+}
2-oxostearic acid
+ NADH

The two substrates of this enzyme are (R)-2-hydroxystearic acid and oxidised nicotinamide adenine dinucleotide (NAD^{+}). Its products are 2-oxostearic acid, reduced NADH, and a proton. This reaction is important in fatty acid metabolism.

This enzyme belongs to the family of oxidoreductases, specifically those acting on the CH-OH group of donor with NAD^{+} or NADP^{+} as acceptor. The systematic name of this enzyme class is (R)-2-hydroxystearate:NAD^{+} oxidoreductase. Other names in common use include D-2-hydroxy fatty acid dehydrogenase, and 2-hydroxy fatty acid oxidase.

== See also ==
- (S)-2-hydroxy-fatty-acid dehydrogenase which acts on the enantiomer of the hydroxy acid.
