= (R)-3-hydroxyacid-ester dehydrogenase =

Class of enzymes

Identifiers
- EC no.: 1.1.1.279
- CAS no.: 114705-02-1

Databases
- IntEnz: IntEnz view
- BRENDA: BRENDA entry
- ExPASy: NiceZyme view
- KEGG: KEGG entry
- MetaCyc: metabolic pathway
- PRIAM: profile
- PDB structures: RCSB PDB PDBe PDBsum
- Gene Ontology: AmiGO / QuickGO
Search
- PMC: articles
- PubMed: articles
- NCBI: proteins

In enzymology, (R)-3-hydroxyacid-ester dehydrogenase (EC 1.1.1.279) is an enzyme that catalyzes the chemical reaction

ethyl (R)-3-hydroxyhexanoate
+ NADP^{+}
H^{+}
H^{+}
ethyl 3-oxohexanoate
+ NADPH

The two substrates of this enzyme are ethyl (R)-3-hydroxyhexanoate and oxidised nicotinamide adenine dinucleotide phosphate (NADP^{+}). Its products are ethyl 3-oxohexanoate, reduced NADPH, and a proton.

This enzyme belongs to the family of oxidoreductases, specifically those acting on the CH-OH group of donor with NAD^{+} or NADP^{+} as acceptor. The systematic name of this enzyme class is ethyl-(R)-3-hydroxyhexanoate:NADP^{+} 3-oxidoreductase. This enzyme is also called 3-oxo ester (R)-reductase.

== See also ==
- (S)-3-hydroxyacid-ester dehydrogenase which acts on the enantiomer of the substrate
