= Sulochrin oxidase =

Sulochrin oxidase may refer to:

- Sulochrin oxidase ((+)-bisdechlorogeodin-forming)
- Sulochrin oxidase ((-)-bisdechlorogeodin-forming)
