= Sulochrin oxidase ((+)-bisdechlorogeodin-forming) =

sulochrin oxidase [(+)-bisdechlorogeodin-forming]

Identifiers
- EC no.: 1.21.3.4
- CAS no.: 82469-87-2

Databases
- IntEnz: IntEnz view
- BRENDA: BRENDA entry
- ExPASy: NiceZyme view
- KEGG: KEGG entry
- MetaCyc: metabolic pathway
- PRIAM: profile
- PDB structures: RCSB PDB PDBe PDBsum
- Gene Ontology: AmiGO / QuickGO
Search
- PMC: articles
- PubMed: articles
- NCBI: proteins

In enzymology, a sulochrin oxidase [(+)-bisdechlorogeodin-forming] (EC 1.21.3.4) is an enzyme that catalyzes the chemical reaction

2 sulochrin + O_{2} $\rightleftharpoons$ 2 (+)-bisdechlorogeodin + 2 H_{2}O

Thus, the two substrates of this enzyme are sulochrin and O_{2}, whereas its two products are (+)-bisdechlorogeodin and H_{2}O.

This enzyme belongs to the family of oxidoreductases, specifically those acting on X-H and Y-H to form an X-Y bond with oxygen as acceptor. The systematic name of this enzyme class is sulochrin:oxygen oxidoreductase (cyclizing, (+)-specific). This enzyme is also called sulochrin oxidase.
