= TRNA-dihydrouridine16/17 synthase (NAD(P)+) =

Class of enzymes

DUS1L

Identifiers
- Aliases: DUS1L, DUS1, PP3111, dihydrouridine synthase 1 like
- External IDs: MGI: 1915980; GeneCards: DUS1L
Enzyme activity
EC #	BRENDA	ExPASy	KEGG	MetaCyc
1.3.1.88	↗	↗	↗	↗

Gene location (Human)
Chr.	Chromosome 17 (human)
Band	17q25.3	Start	82,057,506 bp
Band	17q25.3	End	82,065,887 bp

Gene location (Mouse)
Chr.	Chromosome 11 (mouse)
Band	11|11 E2	Start	120,680,027 bp
Band	11|11 E2	End	120,687,229 bp
RNA expression pattern
Bgee	Human / Mouse (ortholog); Top expressed in: body of pancreas; mucosa of transverse colon; body of stomach; right lobe of liver; apex of heart; granulocyte; skin of abdomen; skin of leg; minor salivary glands; olfactory zone of nasal mucosa / Top expressed in: Paneth cell; left lobe of liver; fossa; condyle; hair follicle; right kidney; medullary collecting duct; renal corpuscle; motor neuron; primitive streak; More reference expression data
BioGPS	n/a
Gene ontology
Molecular function	oxidoreductase activity; catalytic activity; flavin adenine dinucleotide binding; tRNA dihydrouridine synthase activity
Cellular component	cytosol
Biological process	tRNA processing; tRNA dihydrouridine synthesis
Sources:Amigo / QuickGO
Orthologs
Databases	NCBI: entry; OMA: entry
Species	Human	Mouse
Entrez	64118	68730
Ensembl	ENSG00000169718	ENSMUSG00000025155
UniProt	Q6P1R4	Q8C2P3
RefSeq (mRNA)	NM_022156	NM_026824
RefSeq (protein)	NP_071439	NP_081100
Location (UCSC)	Chr 17: 82.06 – 82.07 Mb	Chr 11: 120.68 – 120.69 Mb
PubMed search
- Wikidata
View/Edit Human	View/Edit Mouse

TRNA-dihydrouridine16/17 synthase (NAD(P)^{+}) (EC 1.3.1.88, Dus1p, tRNA-dihydrouridine synthase 1) is an enzyme with systematic name tRNA-5,6-dihydrouracil16/17:NAD(P)^{+} oxidoreductase. This enzyme catalyses the following chemical reaction

(1) 5,6-dihydrouracil16 in tRNA + NAD(P)^{+} $\rightleftharpoons$ uracil16 in tRNA + NAD(P)H + H_{+}
(2) 5,6-dihydrouracil17 in tRNA + NAD(P)^{+} $\rightleftharpoons$ uracil17 in tRNA + NAD(P)H + H^{+}

This enzyme specifically modifies uracil16 and uracil17 in tRNA.
