= TRNA-dihydrouridine20a/20b synthase (NAD(P)+) =

Class of enzymes

DUS4L

Identifiers
- Aliases: DUS4L, DUS4, PP35, dihydrouridine synthase 4 like
- External IDs: MGI: 1919166; GeneCards: DUS4L
Enzyme activity
EC #	BRENDA	ExPASy	KEGG	MetaCyc
1.3.1.90	↗	↗	↗	↗

Gene location (Human)
Chr.	Chromosome 7 (human)
Band	7q22.3	Start	107,563,484 bp
Band	7q22.3	End	107,578,523 bp

Gene location (Mouse)
Chr.	Chromosome 12 (mouse)
Band	12|12 A3	Start	31,690,049 bp
Band	12|12 A3	End	31,704,825 bp
RNA expression pattern
Bgee	Human / Mouse (ortholog); Top expressed in: endometrium; testicle; ventricular zone; ganglionic eminence; gonad; C1 segment; islet of Langerhans; renal cortex; right adrenal cortex; bone marrow cell / Top expressed in: embryo; genital tubercle; tail of embryo; ventricular zone; embryo; morula; zygote; blastocyst; neural layer of retina; Rostral migratory stream; More reference expression data
BioGPS	n/a
Gene ontology
Molecular function	oxidoreductase activity; catalytic activity; flavin adenine dinucleotide binding; tRNA dihydrouridine synthase activity
Cellular component	cytosol
Biological process	tRNA processing; tRNA dihydrouridine synthesis
Sources:Amigo / QuickGO
Orthologs
Databases	NCBI: entry; OMA: entry
Species	Human	Mouse
Entrez	11062	71916
Ensembl	ENSG00000105865; ENSG00000284103	ENSMUSG00000020648
UniProt	O95620	Q32M08
RefSeq (mRNA)	NM_001270419; NM_181581	NM_028002
RefSeq (protein)	NP_001257348; NP_853559	NP_082278
Location (UCSC)	Chr 7: 107.56 – 107.58 Mb	Chr 12: 31.69 – 31.7 Mb
PubMed search
- Wikidata
View/Edit Human	View/Edit Mouse

TRNA-dihydrouridine20a/20b synthase (NAD(P)^{+}) (EC 1.3.1.90, Dus4p) is an enzyme with systematic name tRNA-5,6-dihydrouracil20a/20b:NAD(P)^{+} oxidoreductase. This enzyme catalyses the following chemical reaction

(1) 5,6-dihydrouracil20a in tRNA + NAD(P)^{+} $\rightleftharpoons$ uracil20a in tRNA + NAD(P)H + H^{+}
(2) 5,6-dihydrouracil20b in tRNA + NAD(P)^{+} $\rightleftharpoons$ uracil20b in tRNA + NAD(P)H + H^{+}

A flavoenzyme. The enzyme specifically modifies uracil20a and uracil20b in tRNA.
