= TRNA-dihydrouridine47 synthase (NAD(P)+) =

Class of enzymes

DUS3L

Identifiers
- Aliases: DUS3L, DUS3, dihydrouridine synthase 3 like
- External IDs: MGI: 2147092; GeneCards: DUS3L
Enzyme activity
EC #	BRENDA	ExPASy	KEGG	MetaCyc
1.3.1.89	↗	↗	↗	↗

Gene location (Human)
Chr.	Chromosome 19 (human)
Band	19p13.3	Start	5,784,832 bp
Band	19p13.3	End	5,791,225 bp

Gene location (Mouse)
Chr.	Chromosome 17 (mouse)
Band	17|17 D	Start	57,071,757 bp
Band	17|17 D	End	57,077,093 bp
RNA expression pattern
Bgee	Human / Mouse (ortholog); Top expressed in: right testis; left testis; granulocyte; right uterine tube; skin of abdomen; right lobe of thyroid gland; left uterine tube; skin of leg; minor salivary glands; left ovary / Top expressed in: lateral septal nucleus; internal carotid artery; lateral hypothalamus; cerebellar vermis; lobe of cerebellum; external carotid artery; anterior amygdaloid area; superior colliculus; ventromedial nucleus; mammillary body; More reference expression data
BioGPS	n/a
Gene ontology
Molecular function	oxidoreductase activity; catalytic activity; metal ion binding; flavin adenine dinucleotide binding; RNA binding; tRNA dihydrouridine synthase activity
Cellular component	cytosol
Biological process	tRNA processing; tRNA dihydrouridine synthesis
Sources:Amigo / QuickGO
Orthologs
Databases	NCBI: entry; OMA: entry
Species	Human	Mouse
Entrez	56931	224907
Ensembl	ENSG00000141994	ENSMUSG00000007603
UniProt	Q96G46	Q91XI1
RefSeq (mRNA)	NM_001161619; NM_020175	NM_144858; NM_001360405
RefSeq (protein)	NP_001155091; NP_064560	NP_659107; NP_001347334
Location (UCSC)	Chr 19: 5.78 – 5.79 Mb	Chr 17: 57.07 – 57.08 Mb
PubMed search
- Wikidata
View/Edit Human	View/Edit Mouse

TRNA-dihydrouridine47 synthase (NAD(P)^{+}) (EC 1.3.1.89, Dus3p, tRNA-dihydrouridine synthase 3) is an enzyme with systematic name tRNA-5,6-dihydrouracil47:NAD(P)^{+} oxidoreductase. This enzyme catalyses the following chemical reaction

5,6-dihydrouracil47 in tRNA + NAD(P)^{+} $\rightleftharpoons$ uracil47 in tRNA + NAD(P)H + H^{+}

This enzyme specifically modifies uracil47 in tRNA.
