= PAAZ (gene) =

PAAZ (gene) may refer to the following:

- 3-Oxo-5,6-dehydrosuberyl-CoA semialdehyde dehydrogenase, an enzyme
- Oxepin-CoA hydrolase, an enzyme
