= 3-Oxo-5,6-dehydrosuberyl-CoA semialdehyde dehydrogenase =

Class of enzymes

3-oxo-5,6-dehydrosuberyl-CoA semialdehyde dehydrogenase

Identifiers
- EC no.: 1.2.1.91

Databases
- IntEnz: IntEnz view
- BRENDA: BRENDA entry
- ExPASy: NiceZyme view
- KEGG: KEGG entry
- MetaCyc: metabolic pathway
- PRIAM: profile
- PDB structures: RCSB PDB PDBe PDBsum
Search
- PMC: articles
- PubMed: articles
- NCBI: proteins

3-oxo-5,6-dehydrosuberyl-CoA semialdehyde dehydrogenase (EC 1.2.1.91, paaZ (gene)) is an enzyme with systematic name 3-oxo-5,6-dehydrosuberyl-CoA semialdehyde:NADP^{+} oxidoreductase. This enzyme catalyses the following chemical reaction

3-oxo-5,6-dehydrosuberyl-CoA semialdehyde + NADP^{+} + H_{2}O $\rightleftharpoons$ 3-oxo-5,6-dehydrosuberyl-CoA + NADPH + H^{+}

The enzyme from Escherichia coli is a bifunctional protein that also acts as EC 3.7.1.16, oxepin-CoA hydrolase.
