= Oxepin-CoA hydrolase =

Class of enzymes

Identifiers
- EC no.: 3.3.2.12

Databases
- BRENDA: enzyme data
- ExPASy: NiceZyme view
- KEGG: enzyme entry
- MetaCyc: metabolic pathway
- Rhea: reactions
- PDB structures: RCSB PDB PDBe PDBsum
Search
- PMC: articles
- PubMed: articles
- NCBI: proteins

Oxepin-CoA hydrolase (EC 3.3.2.12, paaZ (gene)) is an enzyme with systematic name 2-oxepin-2(3H)-ylideneacetyl-CoA hydrolyase. This enzyme catalyses the following chemical reaction

2-oxepin-2(3H)-ylideneacetyl-CoA + H_{2}O $\rightleftharpoons$ 3-oxo-5,6-dehydrosuberyl-CoA semialdehyde

The enzyme is present in bacteria Escherichia coli.
