= Sterol-4alpha-carboxylate 3-dehydrogenase (decarboxylating) =

Enzyme

sterol-4-alpha-carboxylate 3-dehydrogenase (decarboxylating)

Identifiers
- EC no.: 1.1.1.170
- CAS no.: 71822-23-6

Databases
- IntEnz: IntEnz view
- BRENDA: BRENDA entry
- ExPASy: NiceZyme view
- KEGG: KEGG entry
- MetaCyc: metabolic pathway
- PRIAM: profile
- PDB structures: RCSB PDB PDBe PDBsum
- Gene Ontology: AmiGO / QuickGO
Search
- PMC: articles
- PubMed: articles
- NCBI: proteins

In enzymology, a sterol-4alpha-carboxylate 3-dehydrogenase (decarboxylating) (EC 1.1.1.170) is an enzyme that catalyzes the chemical reaction

3beta-hydroxy-4beta-methyl-5alpha-cholest-7-ene-4alpha-carboxylate + NAD(P)^{+} $\rightleftharpoons$ 4alpha-methyl-5alpha-cholest-7-en-3-one + CO_{2} + NAD(P)H

The 3 substrates of this enzyme are 3beta-hydroxy-4beta-methyl-5alpha-cholest-7-ene-4alpha-carboxylate, NAD^{+}, and NADP^{+}, whereas its 4 products are 4alpha-methyl-5alpha-cholest-7-en-3-one, CO_{2}, NADH, and NADPH.

This enzyme belongs to the family of oxidoreductases, specifically those acting on the CH-OH group of donor with NAD^{+} or NADP^{+} as acceptor. The systematic name of this enzyme class is 3beta-hydroxy-4beta-methyl-5alpha-cholest-7-ene-4alpha-carboxylate:NAD(P)^{+} 3-oxidoreductase (decarboxylating). Other names in common use include 3beta-hydroxy-4beta-methylcholestenecarboxylate 3-dehydrogenase, (decarboxylating), 3beta-hydroxy-4beta-methylcholestenoate dehydrogenase, 3beta-hydroxy-4beta-methylcholestenoate dehydrogenase, and sterol 4alpha-carboxylic decarboxylase. This enzyme participates in biosynthesis of steroids.
