= S-(hydroxymethyl)glutathione dehydrogenase =

Identifiers
- EC no.: 1.1.1.284

Databases
- IntEnz: IntEnz view
- BRENDA: BRENDA entry
- ExPASy: NiceZyme view
- KEGG: KEGG entry
- MetaCyc: metabolic pathway
- PRIAM: profile
- PDB structures: RCSB PDB PDBe PDBsum
- Gene Ontology: AmiGO / QuickGO
Search
- PMC: articles
- PubMed: articles
- NCBI: proteins

In enzymology, S-(hydroxymethyl)glutathione dehydrogenase (EC 1.1.1.284) is an enzyme that catalyzes the chemical reaction

S-(hydroxymethyl)glutathione
+ NAD^{+}
H^{+}
H^{+}
S-formylglutathione
+ NADH

The two substrates of this enzyme are S-(hydroxymethyl)glutathione and oxidised nicotinamide adenine dinucleotide (NAD^{+}). Its products are S-formylglutathione, reduced NADH, and a proton. The enzyme can also use the alternative cofactor, nicotinamide adenine dinucleotide phosphate.

This enzyme belongs to the family of oxidoreductases, specifically those acting on the CH-OH group of donor with NAD^{+} or NADP^{+} as acceptor. The systematic name of this enzyme class is S-(hydroxymethyl)glutathione:NAD^{+} oxidoreductase. Other names in common use include NAD-linked formaldehyde dehydrogenase (incorrect), formaldehyde dehydrogenase (incorrect), formic dehydrogenase (incorrect), class III alcohol dehydrogenase, ADH3, &chi, -ADH, FDH (incorrect), formaldehyde dehydrogenase (glutathione) (incorrect), GS-FDH (incorrect), glutathione-dependent formaldehyde dehydrogenase (incorrect), NAD-dependent formaldehyde dehydrogenase, GD-FALDH, and NAD- and glutathione-dependent formaldehyde dehydrogenase. This enzyme participates in methane metabolism.

== Structural studies ==
As of late 2007, two structures have been solved for this class of enzymes, with PDB accession codes 2FZE and 2FZW.
