= 3,4-dihydroxy-9,10-secoandrosta-1,3,5(10)-triene-9,17-dione 4,5-dioxygenase =

Class of enzymes

Identifiers
- EC no.: 1.13.11.25
- CAS no.: 37256-63-6

Databases
- BRENDA: enzyme data
- ExPASy: NiceZyme view
- KEGG: enzyme entry
- MetaCyc: metabolic pathway
- Rhea: reactions
- PDB structures: RCSB PDB PDBe PDBsum
- Gene Ontology: AmiGO / QuickGO
Search
- PMC: articles
- PubMed: articles
- NCBI: proteins

EC 1.13.11.25 chemical reaction

In enzymology, a 3,4-dihydroxy-9,10-secoandrosta-1,3,5(10)-triene-9,17-dione 4,5-dioxygenase (EC 1.13.11.25) is an enzyme that catalyzes the chemical reaction

3,4-dihydroxy-9,10-secoandrosta-1,3,5(10)-triene-9,17-dione + O_{2} $\rightleftharpoons$ 3-hydroxy-5,9,17-trioxo-4,5:9,10-disecoandrosta-1(10),2-dien-4-oate

Thus, the two substrates of this enzyme are 3,4-dihydroxy-9,10-secoandrosta-1,3,5(10)-triene-9,17-dione and O_{2}, whereas its product is 3-hydroxy-5,9,17-trioxo-4,5:9,10-disecoandrosta-1(10),2-dien-4-oate.

This enzyme belongs to the family of oxidoreductases, specifically those acting on single donors with O_{2} as oxidant and incorporation of two atoms of oxygen into the substrate (oxygenases). The oxygen incorporated need not be derived from O_{2}. The systematic name of this enzyme class is 3,4-dihydroxy-9,10-secoandrosta-1,3,5(10)-triene-9,17-dione:oxygen 4,5-oxidoreductase (decyclizing). Other names in common use include steroid 4,5-dioxygenase, and 3-alkylcatechol 2,3-dioxygenase. It employs one cofactor, iron.
