= Aromatic 2-oxoacid reductase =

Enzyme

indolelactate dehydrogenase

Identifiers
- EC no.: 1.1.1.110
- CAS no.: 37250-41-2

Databases
- BRENDA: enzyme data
- ExPASy: NiceZyme view
- KEGG: enzyme entry
- MetaCyc: metabolic pathway
- Rhea: reactions
- PDB structures: RCSB PDB PDBe PDBsum
- Gene Ontology: AmiGO / QuickGO
Search
- PMC: articles
- PubMed: articles
- NCBI: proteins

Aromatic 2-oxoacid reductase (EC 1.1.1.110), previously indolelactate dehydrogenase), are a type of enzyme found in bacteria and plants that catalyze the reversible oxidation and reduction of aryllactate compounds to arylpyruvate compounds using the redox cofactor nicotinamide adenine dinucleotide or the similar nicotinamide adenine dinucleotide phosphate. For example, the enzyme may oxidize (R)-3-(4-hydroxyphenyl)lactate to 3-(4-hydroxyphenyl)pyruvic acid.

(R)-3-(4-hydroxyphenyl)lactate
+ NAD^{+}
H^{+}
H^{+}
3-(4-hydroxyphenyl)pyruvic acid
+ NADH

This enzyme is an oxidoreductase, oxidizing the CH-OH alcohol group to a carbonyl group. NAD^{+} is the oxidizing agent, yielding reduced NADH.

Aryllactates and arylpyruvates are intermediates in tyrosine, phenylalanine and tryptophan metabolism and blood serum levels of these compounds affect intestinal permeability and systemic immunity in mice.

Alternative names for these enzymes are: (R)-aromatic lactate dehydrogenase, D-aryllactate D-hydrogenase, (indol-3-yl)lactate:NAD^{+} oxidoreductase, indolelactate:NAD^{+} oxidoreductase, (R)-4-hydroxyphenyllactate dehydrogenase, (R)-3-(4-hydroxyphenyl)lactate:NAD(P)^{+} 2-oxidoreductase
