= 4-hydroxythreonine-4-phosphate dehydrogenase =

Protein family

Identifiers
- EC no.: 1.1.1.262

Databases
- IntEnz: IntEnz view
- BRENDA: BRENDA entry
- ExPASy: NiceZyme view
- KEGG: KEGG entry
- MetaCyc: metabolic pathway
- PRIAM: profile
- PDB structures: RCSB PDB PDBe PDBsum
- Gene Ontology: AmiGO / QuickGO
Search
- PMC: articles
- PubMed: articles
- NCBI: proteins

In enzymology, 4-hydroxythreonine-4-phosphate dehydrogenase (EC 1.1.1.262) is an enzyme that catalyzes the chemical reaction

4-(phosphonooxy)-L-threonine
+ NAD^{+}
H^{+}
H^{+}
(2S)-2-amino-3-oxo-4-phosphonooxybutanoic acid
+ NADH

The two substrates of this enzyme are 4-phosphonooxy-L-threonine and oxidised nicotinamide adenine dinucleotide (NAD^{+}). Its products are (2S)-2-amino-3-oxo-4-phosphonooxybutanoate, reduced NADH, and a proton.

This enzyme belongs to the family of oxidoreductases, specifically those acting on the CH-OH group of donor with NAD^{+} or NADP^{+} as acceptor. The systematic name of this enzyme class is 4-phosphonooxy-L-threonine:NAD^{+} oxidoreductase. Other names in common use include NAD^{+}-dependent threonine 4-phosphate dehydrogenase, L-threonine 4-phosphate dehydrogenase, 4-(phosphohydroxy)-L-threonine dehydrogenase, PdxA, and 4-(phosphonooxy)-L-threonine:NAD^{+} oxidoreductase. This enzyme participates in vitamin B_{6} metabolism.

== Structural studies ==
As of late 2007, 6 structures have been solved for this class of enzymes, with PDB accession codes 1PS6, 1PS7, 1PTM, 1R8K, 1YXO, and 2HI1.
