= 15-oxoprostaglandin 13-oxidase =

Class of enzymes

Identifiers
- EC no.: 1.3.1.48
- CAS no.: 57406-74-3

Databases
- IntEnz: IntEnz view
- BRENDA: BRENDA entry
- ExPASy: NiceZyme view
- KEGG: KEGG entry
- MetaCyc: metabolic pathway
- PRIAM: profile
- PDB structures: RCSB PDB PDBe PDBsum
- Gene Ontology: AmiGO / QuickGO
Search
- PMC: articles
- PubMed: articles
- NCBI: proteins

In enzymology, 15-oxoprostaglandin 13-oxidase (EC 1.3.1.48) is an enzyme that catalyzes the chemical reaction

15-oxodihydroprostaglandin E1
+ NAD^{+}
H^{+}
H^{+}
15-oxoprostaglandin E1
+ NADH

The two substrates of this enzyme are 15-oxodihydroprostaglandin E1 and oxidised nicotinamide adenine dinucleotide (NAD^{+}). Its products are 15-oxoprostaglandin E1, reduced NADH, and a proton. The enzyme can also use nicotinamide adenine dinucleotide phosphate as an alternative cofactor.

This enzyme belongs to the family of oxidoreductases, specifically those acting on the CH-CH group of donor with NAD+ or NADP+ as acceptor. The systematic name of this enzyme class is (5Z)-(15S)-11alpha-hydroxy-9,15-dioxoprostanoate:NAD(P)+ Delta13-oxidoreductase. Other names in common use include 15-oxo-Delta13-prostaglandin reductase, Delta13-15-ketoprostaglandin reductase, 15-ketoprostaglandin Delta13-reductase, prostaglandin Delta13-reductase, prostaglandin 13-reductase, and 15-ketoprostaglandin Delta13-reductase.

== Structural studies ==
As of late 2007, 4 structures have been solved for this class of enzymes, with PDB accession codes 1V3T, 1V3U, 1V3V, and 2DM6.
