= 5-amino-6-(5-phosphoribosylamino)uracil reductase =

Class of enzymes

Identifiers
- EC no.: 1.1.1.193
- CAS no.: 69020-28-6

Databases
- IntEnz: IntEnz view
- BRENDA: BRENDA entry
- ExPASy: NiceZyme view
- KEGG: KEGG entry
- MetaCyc: metabolic pathway
- PRIAM: profile
- PDB structures: RCSB PDB PDBe PDBsum
- Gene Ontology: AmiGO / QuickGO
Search
- PMC: articles
- PubMed: articles
- NCBI: proteins

In enzymology, 5-amino-6-(5-phosphoribosylamino)uracil reductase (EC 1.1.1.193) is an enzyme that catalyzes the chemical reaction

5-amino-6-(5-phospho-D-ribitylamino)uracil
+ NADP^{+}
H^{+}
H^{+}
5-amino-6-(5-phospho-β-D-ribosylamino)uracil
+ NADPH

The two substrates of this enzyme are 5-amino-6-(5-phospho-D-ribitylamino)uracil and oxidised nicotinamide adenine dinucleotide phosphate (NADP^{+}). Its products are 5-amino-6-(5-phospho-β-D-ribosylamino)uracil, reduced NADPH, and a proton.

This enzyme belongs to the family of oxidoreductases, specifically those acting on the CH-OH group of donor with NAD^{+} or NADP^{+} as acceptor. The systematic name of this enzyme class is 5-amino-6-(5-phosphoribitylamino)uracil:NADP^{+} 1'-oxidoreductase. This enzyme is also called aminodioxyphosphoribosylaminopyrimidine reductase. This enzyme participates in riboflavin metabolism.

== Structural studies ==
As of late 2007, 7 structures have been solved for this class of enzymes, with PDB accession codes 2AZN, 2B3Z, 2D5N, 2G6V, 2HXV, 2O7P, and 2OBC.
