= Tryptophan 2'-dioxygenase =

tryptophan 2'-dioxygenase

Identifiers
- EC no.: 1.13.99.3
- CAS no.: 64295-81-4

Databases
- BRENDA: enzyme data
- ExPASy: NiceZyme view
- KEGG: enzyme entry
- MetaCyc: metabolic pathway
- Rhea: reactions
- PDB structures: RCSB PDB PDBe PDBsum
- Gene Ontology: AmiGO / QuickGO
Search
- PMC: articles
- PubMed: articles
- NCBI: proteins

In enzymology, a tryptophan 2'-dioxygenase (EC 1.13.99.3) is an enzyme that catalyzes the chemical reaction

L-tryptophan + O_{2} + H^{+} $\rightleftharpoons$ (indol-3-yl)glycolaldehyde + CO_{2} + NH^{+}_{4}

Thus, the 3 substrates of this enzyme are L-tryptophan, O_{2} and H^{+}, whereas its 3 products are (indol-3-yl)glycolaldehyde, CO_{2}, and NH^{+}_{4}.

== Classification ==
This enzyme belongs to the family of oxidoreductases, specifically those acting on single donors with O_{2} as an oxidant and incorporating of two atoms of oxygen into the substrate (oxygenases). The oxygen incorporated need not be derived from O miscellaneous.

== Nomenclature ==
The systematic name of this enzyme class is L-tryptophan:oxygen 2'-oxidoreductase (side-chain-cleaving). Other names in common use include indole-3-alkane alpha-hydroxylase, tryptophan side-chain alpha,beta-oxidase, tryptophan side chain oxidase II, tryptophan side-chain oxidase, TSO, indolyl-3-alkan alpha-hydroxylase, tryptophan side chain oxidase type I, TSO I, TSO II, and tryptophan side chain oxidase.

== Biological role ==
This enzyme participates in tryptophan metabolism. It employs one cofactor, heme.
