= Cis-1,2-dihydro-1,2-dihydroxynaphthalene dehydrogenase =

Class of enzymes

cis-1,2-dihydro-1,2-dihydroxynaphthalene dehydrogenase

Identifiers
- EC no.: 1.3.1.29
- CAS no.: 53986-49-5

Databases
- IntEnz: IntEnz view
- BRENDA: BRENDA entry
- ExPASy: NiceZyme view
- KEGG: KEGG entry
- MetaCyc: metabolic pathway
- PRIAM: profile
- PDB structures: RCSB PDB PDBe PDBsum
- Gene Ontology: AmiGO / QuickGO
Search
- PMC: articles
- PubMed: articles
- NCBI: proteins

In enzymology, cis-1,2-dihydro-1,2-dihydroxynaphthalene dehydrogenase (EC 1.3.1.29) is an enzyme that catalyzes the chemical reaction

cis 1,2 dihydroxy-1,2-dihydronaphthalene
+ NAD^{+}
H^{+}
H^{+}
1,2-naphthalenediol
+ NADH

The two substrates of this enzyme are (1R, 2S)-cis 1,2 dihydroxy-1,2-dihydronaphthalene and oxidised nicotinamide adenine dinucleotide (NAD^{+}). Its products are 1,2-naphthalenediol, reduced NADH, and a proton.

This enzyme belongs to the family of oxidoreductases, specifically those acting on the CH-CH group of donor with NAD+ or NADP+ as acceptor. The systematic name of this enzyme class is cis-1,2-dihydronaphthalene-1,2-diol:NAD+ 1,2-oxidoreductase. Other names in common use include (+)-cis-naphthalene dihydrodiol dehydrogenase, naphthalene dihydrodiol dehydrogenase, and cis-dihydrodiol naphthalene dehydrogenase. This enzyme participates in 1- and 2-methylnaphthalene degradation and naphthalene and anthracene degradation.
