= 3-carboxyethylcatechol 2,3-dioxygenase =

Class of enzymes

Identifiers
- EC no.: 1.13.11.16
- CAS no.: 105503-63-7

Databases
- IntEnz: IntEnz view
- BRENDA: BRENDA entry
- ExPASy: NiceZyme view
- KEGG: KEGG entry
- MetaCyc: metabolic pathway
- PRIAM: profile
- PDB structures: RCSB PDB PDBe PDBsum
- Gene Ontology: AmiGO / QuickGO
Search
- PMC: articles
- PubMed: articles
- NCBI: proteins

In enzymology, a 3-carboxyethylcatechol 2,3-dioxygenase (EC 1.13.11.16) is an enzyme that catalyzes the chemical reaction

3-(2,3-dihydroxyphenyl)propanoate + O_{2} $\rightleftharpoons$ 2-hydroxy-6-oxonona-2,4-diene-1,9-dioate

Thus, the two substrates of this enzyme are 3-(2,3-dihydroxyphenyl)propanoate and O_{2}, whereas its product is 2-hydroxy-6-oxonona-2,4-diene-1,9-dioate.

This enzyme belongs to the family of oxidoreductases, specifically those acting on single donors with O_{2} as oxidant and incorporation of two atoms of oxygen into the substrate (oxygenases). The oxygen incorporated need not be derived from O_{2}. The systematic name of this enzyme class is 3-(2,3-dihydroxyphenyl)propanoate:oxygen 1,2-oxidoreductase (decyclizing). Other names in common use include 2,3-dihydroxy-beta-phenylpropionic dioxygenase, 2,3-dihydroxy-beta-phenylpropionate oxygenase, and 3-(2,3-dihydroxyphenyl)propanoate:oxygen 1,2-oxidoreductase. This enzyme participates in phenylalanine metabolism. It employs one cofactor, iron.
