= LIGC =

LIGC may refer to:

- National Library of Wales (Welsh: Llyfrgell Genedlaethol Cymru)
- 2-hydroxy-4-carboxymuconate semialdehyde hemiacetal dehydrogenase or LigC, an enzyme
