= 2-hydroxy-4-carboxymuconate semialdehyde hemiacetal dehydrogenase =

Class of enzymes

Identifiers
- EC no.: 1.1.1.312

Databases
- IntEnz: IntEnz view
- BRENDA: BRENDA entry
- ExPASy: NiceZyme view
- KEGG: KEGG entry
- MetaCyc: metabolic pathway
- PRIAM: profile
- PDB structures: RCSB PDB PDBe PDBsum
Search
- PMC: articles
- PubMed: articles
- NCBI: proteins

2-hydroxy-4-carboxymuconate semialdehyde hemiacetal dehydrogenase (EC 1.1.1.312, 2-hydroxy-4-carboxymuconate 6-semialdehyde dehydrogenase, 4-carboxy-2-hydroxy-cis,cis-muconate-6-semialdehyde:NADP^{+} oxidoreductase, alpha-hydroxy-gamma-carboxymuconic epsilon-semialdehyde dehydrogenase, 4-carboxy-2-hydroxymuconate-6-semialdehyde dehydrogenase, LigC, ProD) is an enzyme with systematic name 4-carboxy-2-hydroxymuconate semialdehyde hemiacetal:NADP^{+} 2-oxidoreductase. This enzyme catalyses the following chemical reaction:

4-carboxy-2-hydroxymuconate semialdehyde hemiacetal
+ NADP^{+}
H^{+}
H^{+}
2-oxo-2H-pyran-4,6-dicarboxylic acid
+ NADPH

Unsubstituted aliphatic or aromatic aldehydes or glucose cannot serve as substrate of this enzyme.
