= Hydroxycyclohexanecarboxylate dehydrogenase =

hydroxycyclohexanecarboxylate dehydrogenase

Identifiers
- EC no.: 1.1.1.166
- CAS no.: 55467-53-3

Databases
- IntEnz: IntEnz view
- BRENDA: BRENDA entry
- ExPASy: NiceZyme view
- KEGG: KEGG entry
- MetaCyc: metabolic pathway
- PRIAM: profile
- PDB structures: RCSB PDB PDBe PDBsum
- Gene Ontology: AmiGO / QuickGO
Search
- PMC: articles
- PubMed: articles
- NCBI: proteins

In enzymology, hydroxycyclohexanecarboxylate dehydrogenase (EC 1.1.1.166) is an enzyme that catalyzes the chemical reaction

3,4-dihydroxycyclohexane-1-carboxylic acid
+ NAD^{+}
H^{+}
H^{+}
4-hydroxy-3-oxocyclohexane-1-carboxylic acid
+ NADH

The two substrates of this enzyme are (1S,3R,4S)-3,4-dihydroxycyclohexane-1-carboxylic acid and oxidised nicotinamide adenine dinucleotide (NAD^{+}). Its products are (1S,4S)-4-hydroxy-3-oxocyclohexane-1-carboxylic acid, reduced NADH, and a proton.

This enzyme belongs to the family of oxidoreductases, specifically those acting on the CH-OH group of donor with NAD^{+} or NADP^{+} as acceptor. The systematic name of this enzyme class is (1S,3R,4S)-3,4-dihydroxycyclohexane-1-carboxylate:NAD^{+} 3-oxidoreductase. Other names in common use include dihydroxycyclohexanecarboxylate dehydrogenase, and (−)t-3,t-4-dihydroxycyclohexane-c-1-carboxylate-NAD^{+} oxidoreductase.
