= Steroid 11beta-monooxygenase =

Enzyme

steroid 11-beta-monooxygenase

Identifiers
- EC no.: 1.14.15.4
- CAS no.: 9029-66-7

Databases
- IntEnz: IntEnz view
- BRENDA: BRENDA entry
- ExPASy: NiceZyme view
- KEGG: KEGG entry
- MetaCyc: metabolic pathway
- PRIAM: profile
- PDB structures: RCSB PDB PDBe PDBsum
- Gene Ontology: AmiGO / QuickGO
Search
- PMC: articles
- PubMed: articles
- NCBI: proteins

In enzymology, a steroid 11beta-monooxygenase (EC 1.14.15.4) is an enzyme that catalyzes the chemical reaction

a steroid + reduced adrenal ferredoxin + O_{2} $\rightleftharpoons$ an 11beta-hydroxysteroid + oxidized adrenal ferredoxin + H_{2}O

The 3 substrates of this enzyme are steroid, reduced adrenal ferredoxin, and O_{2}, whereas its 3 products are 11beta-hydroxysteroid, oxidized adrenal ferredoxin, and H_{2}O.

This enzyme belongs to the family of oxidoreductases, specifically those acting on paired donors, with O2 as oxidant and incorporation or reduction of oxygen. The oxygen incorporated need not be derived from O2 with reduced iron-sulfur protein as one donor, and incorporation o one atom of oxygen into the other donor. The systematic name of this enzyme class is steroid,reduced-adrenal-ferredoxin:oxygen oxidoreductase (11beta-hydroxylating). Other names in common use include steroid 11beta-hydroxylase, steroid 11beta/18-hydroxylase, and oxygenase, steroid 11beta -mono-. This enzyme participates in c21-steroid hormone metabolism and androgen and estrogen metabolism. It employs one cofactor, heme.
