= Diaminopimelate dehydrogenase =

diaminopimelate dehydrogenase

Identifiers
- EC no.: 1.4.1.16
- CAS no.: 60894-21-5

Databases
- IntEnz: IntEnz view
- BRENDA: BRENDA entry
- ExPASy: NiceZyme view
- KEGG: KEGG entry
- MetaCyc: metabolic pathway
- PRIAM: profile
- PDB structures: RCSB PDB PDBe PDBsum
- Gene Ontology: AmiGO / QuickGO
Search
- PMC: articles
- PubMed: articles
- NCBI: proteins

In enzymology, diaminopimelate dehydrogenase (EC 1.4.1.16) is an enzyme that catalyzes the chemical reaction

meso-diaminopimeilic acid
+ NADP^{+}
H_{2}O
H^{+}
H_{2}O
H^{+}
(S)-2-amino-6-oxopimelic acid
+ NADPH + NH_{3}

The three substrates of this enzyme are meso-diaminopimeilic acid, water, and oxidised nicotinamide adenine dinucleotide phosphate (NADP^{+}). Its products are (S)-2-amino-6-oxopimelic acid, ammonia, reduced NADPH, and a proton.

This enzyme belongs to the family of oxidoreductases, specifically those acting on the CH-NH_{2} group of donors with NAD+ or NADP+ as acceptor. The systematic name of this enzyme class is meso-2,6-diaminoheptanedioate:NADP+ oxidoreductase (deaminating). Other names in common use include meso-alpha,epsilon-diaminopimelate dehydrogenase, and meso-diaminopimelate dehydrogenase. This enzyme participates in lysine biosynthesis.

== Structural studies ==
As of late 2007, 4 structures have been solved for this class of enzymes, with PDB accession codes 1DAP, 1F06, 2DAP, and 3DAP.
