= 7,8-dihydroxykynurenate 8,8a-dioxygenase =

Class of enzymes

Identifiers
- EC no.: 1.13.11.10
- CAS no.: 9029-58-7

Databases
- IntEnz: IntEnz view
- BRENDA: BRENDA entry
- ExPASy: NiceZyme view
- KEGG: KEGG entry
- MetaCyc: metabolic pathway
- PRIAM: profile
- PDB structures: RCSB PDB PDBe PDBsum
- Gene Ontology: AmiGO / QuickGO
Search
- PMC: articles
- PubMed: articles
- NCBI: proteins

In enzymology, a 7,8-dihydroxykynurenate 8,8a-dioxygenase (EC 1.13.11.10) is an enzyme that catalyzes the chemical reaction

7,8-dihydroxykynurenate + O_{2} $\rightleftharpoons$ 5-(3-carboxy-3-oxopropenyl)-4,6-dihydroxypyridine-2-carboxylate

Thus, the two substrates of this enzyme are 7,8-dihydroxykynurenate and O_{2}, whereas its product is 5-(3-carboxy-3-oxopropenyl)-4,6-dihydroxypyridine-2-carboxylate.

This enzyme belongs to the family of oxidoreductases, specifically those acting on single donors with O_{2} as oxidant and incorporation of two atoms of oxygen into the substrate (oxygenases). The oxygen incorporated need not be derived from O_{2}. The systematic name of this enzyme class is 7,8-dihydroxykynurenate:oxygen 8,8a-oxidoreductase (decyclizing). Other names in common use include 7,8-dihydroxykynurenate oxygenase, and 7,8-dihydroxykynurenate 8,8alpha-dioxygenase. This enzyme participates in tryptophan metabolism. It employs one cofactor, iron.
