= Kynurenate-7,8-dihydrodiol dehydrogenase =

Class of enzymes

kynurenate-7,8-dihydrodiol dehydrogenase

Identifiers
- EC no.: 1.3.1.18
- CAS no.: 37255-30-4

Databases
- IntEnz: IntEnz view
- BRENDA: BRENDA entry
- ExPASy: NiceZyme view
- KEGG: KEGG entry
- MetaCyc: metabolic pathway
- PRIAM: profile
- PDB structures: RCSB PDB PDBe PDBsum
- Gene Ontology: AmiGO / QuickGO
Search
- PMC: articles
- PubMed: articles
- NCBI: proteins

In enzymology, kynurenate-7,8-dihydrodiol dehydrogenase (EC 1.3.1.18) is an enzyme that catalyzes the chemical reaction

7,8-dihydro-7,8-dihydroxykynurenic acid
+ NAD^{+}
H^{+}
H^{+}
7,8-dihydroxykynurenic acid
+ NADH

The two substrates of this enzyme are 7,8-dihydro-7,8-dihydroxykynurenic acid and oxidised nicotinamide adenine dinucleotide (NAD^{+}). Its products are 7,8-dihydroxykynurenic acid, reduced NADH, and a proton.

This enzyme belongs to the family of oxidoreductases, specifically those acting on the CH-CH group of donor with NAD+ or NADP+ as acceptor. The systematic name of this enzyme class is 7,8-dihydro-7,8-dihydroxykynurenate:NAD+ oxidoreductase. Other names in common use include 7,8-dihydro-7,8-dihydroxykynurenate dehydrogenase, and 7,8-dihydroxykynurenic acid 7,8-diol dehydrogenase. This enzyme participates in tryptophan metabolism.
