= 4-(dimethylamino)phenylazoxybenzene reductase =

Class of enzymes

4-(dimethylamino) phenylazoxybenzene reductase

Identifiers
- EC no.: 1.7.1.11
- CAS no.: 103843-39-6

Databases
- BRENDA: enzyme data
- ExPASy: NiceZyme view
- KEGG: enzyme entry
- MetaCyc: metabolic pathway
- Rhea: reactions
- PDB structures: RCSB PDB PDBe PDBsum
- Gene Ontology: AmiGO / QuickGO
Search
- PMC: articles
- PubMed: articles
- NCBI: proteins

4-(dimethylamino)phenylazoxybenzene reductase (EC 1.7.1.11) is an enzyme that catalyzes the chemical reaction

4-(dimethylamino)phenylazoxybenzene
+ NADPH
H^{+}
H_{2}O
H^{+}
H_{2}O
4-(dimethylamino)azobenzene
+ NADP^{+}

The two substrates of this enzyme are 4-(dimethylamino)phenylazoxybenzene and reduced nicotinamide adenine dinucleotide phosphate (NADPH). Its products are 4-(dimethylamino)azobenzene, oxidised NADP^{+}, and water.

This enzyme belongs to the family of oxidoreductases, specifically those acting on other nitrogenous compounds as donors with NAD+ or NADP+ as acceptor. The systematic name of this enzyme class is 4-(dimethylamino)phenylazobenzene:NADP+ oxidoreductase. Other names in common use include N,N-dimethyl-p-aminoazobenzene oxide reductase, dimethylaminoazobenzene N-oxide reductase, NADPH-dependent DMAB N-oxide reductase, and NADPH:4-(dimethylamino)phenylazoxybenzene oxidoreductase.
