= 4,4'-Diapophytoene desaturase =

Enzyme

4,4'-diapophytoene desaturase

Identifiers
- EC no.: 1.3.8.2

Databases
- IntEnz: IntEnz view
- BRENDA: BRENDA entry
- ExPASy: NiceZyme view
- KEGG: KEGG entry
- MetaCyc: metabolic pathway
- PRIAM: profile
- PDB structures: RCSB PDB PDBe PDBsum
Search
- PMC: articles
- PubMed: articles
- NCBI: proteins

4,4'-Diapophytoene desaturase (EC 1.3.8.2, dehydrosqualene desaturase, CrtN, 4,4'-diapophytoene:FAD oxidoreductase) is an enzyme with systematic name 15-cis-4,4'-diapophytoene:FAD oxidoreductase. This enzyme catalyses the following chemical reaction

15-cis-4,4'-diapophytoene + 4 FAD $\rightleftharpoons$ all-trans-4,4'-diapolycopene + 4 FADH2 (overall reaction)
(1a) 15-cis-4,4'-diapophytoene + FAD $\rightleftharpoons$ all-trans-4,4'-diapophytofluene + FADH2
(1b) all-trans-4,4'-diapophytofluene + FAD $\rightleftharpoons$ all-trans-4,4'-diapo-zeta-carotene + FADH2
(1c) all-trans-4,4'-diapo-zeta-carotene + FAD $\rightleftharpoons$ all-trans-4,4'-diaponeurosporene + FADH2
(1d) all-trans-4,4'-diaponeurosporene + FAD $\rightleftharpoons$ all-trans-4,4'-diapolycopene + FADH2

This enzyme is typical of Staphylococcus aureus and some other bacteria such as Heliobacillus sp.
