= 2-dehydro-3-deoxy-D-gluconate 6-dehydrogenase =

Class of enzymes

Identifiers
- EC no.: 1.1.1.126
- CAS no.: 37250-55-8

Databases
- IntEnz: IntEnz view
- BRENDA: BRENDA entry
- ExPASy: NiceZyme view
- KEGG: KEGG entry
- MetaCyc: metabolic pathway
- PRIAM: profile
- PDB structures: RCSB PDB PDBe PDBsum
- Gene Ontology: AmiGO / QuickGO
Search
- PMC: articles
- PubMed: articles
- NCBI: proteins

In enzymology, a 2-dehydro-3-deoxy-D-gluconate 6-dehydrogenase (EC 1.1.1.126) is an enzyme that catalyzes the chemical reaction

2-dehydro-3-deoxy-D-gluconic acid
+ NADP^{+}
H^{+}
H^{+}
(4S,5S)-4,5-dihydroxy-2,6-dioxohexanoic acid
+ NADPH

The two substrates of this enzyme are 2-dehydro-3-deoxy-D-gluconic acid and oxidised nicotinamide adenine dinucleotide phosphate (NADP^{+}). Its products are (4S,5S)-4,5-dihydroxy-2,6-dioxohexanoic acid, reduced NADPH, and a proton.

This enzyme belongs to the family of oxidoreductases, specifically those acting on the CH-OH group of donor with NAD^{+} or NADP^{+} as acceptor. The systematic name of this enzyme class is 2-dehydro-3-deoxy-D-gluconate:NADP^{+} 6-oxidoreductase. Other names in common use include 2-keto-3-deoxy-D-gluconate dehydrogenase, and 2-keto-3-deoxygluconate dehydrogenase.
