= Mannuronate reductase =

Class of enzymes

mannuronate reductase

Identifiers
- EC no.: 1.1.1.131
- CAS no.: 37250-62-7

Databases
- IntEnz: IntEnz view
- BRENDA: BRENDA entry
- ExPASy: NiceZyme view
- KEGG: KEGG entry
- MetaCyc: metabolic pathway
- PRIAM: profile
- PDB structures: RCSB PDB PDBe PDBsum
- Gene Ontology: AmiGO / QuickGO
Search
- PMC: articles
- PubMed: articles
- NCBI: proteins

In enzymology, mannuronate reductase (EC 1.1.1.131) is an enzyme that catalyzes the chemical reaction

D-mannonic acid
+ NAD^{+}
H^{+}
H^{+}
D-mannuronic acid
+ NADH

The two substrates of this enzyme are D-mannonic acid and oxidised nicotinamide adenine dinucleotide (NAD^{+}). Its products are D-mannuronic acid (shown in open-chain form), reduced NADH, and a proton. The enzyme can also use the alternative cofactor, nicotinamide adenine dinucleotide phosphate.

This enzyme belongs to the family of oxidoreductases, specifically those acting on the CH-OH group of donor with NAD+ or NADP+ as acceptor. The systematic name of this enzyme class is D-mannonate:NAD(P)+ 6-oxidoreductase. Other names in common use include mannonate dehydrogenase, mannonate (nicotinamide adenine dinucleotide, (phosphate))dehydrogenase, mannonate dehydrogenase, mannuronate reductase, mannonate dehydrogenase (NAD(P)+), D-mannonate:nicotinamide adenine dinucleotide (phosphate, and oxidoreductase (D-mannuronate-forming)).
