= Fructose 5-dehydrogenase (NADP+) =

fructose 5-dehydrogenase (NADP^{+})

Identifiers
- EC no.: 1.1.1.124
- CAS no.: 37250-53-6

Databases
- IntEnz: IntEnz view
- BRENDA: BRENDA entry
- ExPASy: NiceZyme view
- KEGG: KEGG entry
- MetaCyc: metabolic pathway
- PRIAM: profile
- PDB structures: RCSB PDB PDBe PDBsum
- Gene Ontology: AmiGO / QuickGO
Search
- PMC: articles
- PubMed: articles
- NCBI: proteins

In enzymology, fructose 5-dehydrogenase (NADP^{+}) (EC 1.1.1.124) is an enzyme that catalyzes the chemical reaction

fructose
+ NADP^{+}
H^{+}
H^{+}
5-dehydro-D-fructose
+ NADPH

The two substrates of this enzyme are D-fructose (shown in its keto form) and oxidised nicotinamide adenine dinucleotide phosphate (NADP^{+}). ts products are 5-dehydro-D-fructose, reduced NADPH, and a proton.

This enzyme belongs to the family of oxidoreductases, specifically those acting on the CH-OH group of donor with NAD^{+} or NADP^{+} as acceptor. The systematic name of this enzyme class is D-fructose:NADP^{+} 5-oxidoreductase. Other names in common use include 5-ketofructose reductase (NADP^{+}), 5-keto-D-fructose reductase (NADP^{+}), fructose 5-(nicotinamide adenine dinucleotide phosphate), dehydrogenase, D-(-)fructose:(NADP^{+}) 5-oxidoreductase, and fructose 5-dehydrogenase (NADP^{+}).
