= (R)-dehydropantoate dehydrogenase =

Class of enzymes

Identifiers
- EC no.: 1.2.1.33
- CAS no.: 37250-96-7

Databases
- IntEnz: IntEnz view
- BRENDA: BRENDA entry
- ExPASy: NiceZyme view
- KEGG: KEGG entry
- MetaCyc: metabolic pathway
- PRIAM: profile
- PDB structures: RCSB PDB PDBe PDBsum
- Gene Ontology: AmiGO / QuickGO
Search
- PMC: articles
- PubMed: articles
- NCBI: proteins

In enzymology, (R)-dehydropantoate dehydrogenase (EC 1.2.1.33) is an enzyme that catalyzes the chemical reaction

(R)-4-dehydropantoic acid
+ NAD^{+}
H_{2}O
H^{+}
H_{2}O
H^{+}
(R)-3,3-dimethylmalic acid
+ NADH

The three substrates of this enzyme are (R)-4-dehydropantoic acid, oxidised nicotinamide adenine dinucleotide (NAD^{+}), and water. Its products are (R)-3,3-dimethylmalic acid, reduced NADH, and a proton.

This enzyme belongs to the family of oxidoreductases, specifically those acting on the aldehyde or oxo group of donor with NAD+ or NADP+ as acceptor. The systematic name of this enzyme class is (R)-4-dehydropantoate:NAD+ 4-oxidoreductase. Other names in common use include D-aldopantoate dehydrogenase, D-2-hydroxy-3,3-dimethyl-3-formylpropionate:diphosphopyridine, and nucleotide (DPN+) oxidoreductase. This enzyme participates in pantothenate and coa biosynthesis.
