= Phthalate 4,5-cis-dihydrodiol dehydrogenase =

Class of enzymes

phthalate 4,5-cis-dihydrodiol dehydrogenase

Identifiers
- EC no.: 1.3.1.64

Databases
- IntEnz: IntEnz view
- BRENDA: BRENDA entry
- ExPASy: NiceZyme view
- KEGG: KEGG entry
- MetaCyc: metabolic pathway
- PRIAM: profile
- PDB structures: RCSB PDB PDBe PDBsum
- Gene Ontology: AmiGO / QuickGO
Search
- PMC: articles
- PubMed: articles
- NCBI: proteins

In enzymology, phthalate 4,5-cis-dihydrodiol dehydrogenase (EC 1.3.1.64) is an enzyme that catalyzes the chemical reaction

4,5-dihydroxycyclohexa-2,6-diene-1,2-dicarboxylic acid
+ NAD^{+}
H^{+}
H^{+}
4,5-dihydroxyphthalic acid
+ NADH

The two substrates of this enzyme are cis-4,5-dihydroxycyclohexa-2,6-diene-1,2-dicarboxylic acid and oxidised nicotinamide adenine dinucleotide (NAD^{+}). Its products are 4,5-dihydroxyphthalic acid, reduced NADH, and a proton.

This enzyme belongs to the family of oxidoreductases, specifically those acting on the CH-CH group of donor with NAD+ or NADP+ as acceptor. The systematic name of this enzyme class is cis-4,5-dihydroxycyclohexa-1(6),2-diene-1,2-dicarboxylate:NAD+ oxidoreductase. This enzyme participates in 2,4-dichlorobenzoate degradation.
