= 4-phosphoerythronate dehydrogenase =

InterPro Family

Identifiers
- EC no.: 1.1.1.290

Databases
- IntEnz: IntEnz view
- BRENDA: BRENDA entry
- ExPASy: NiceZyme view
- KEGG: KEGG entry
- MetaCyc: metabolic pathway
- PRIAM: profile
- PDB structures: RCSB PDB PDBe PDBsum
Search
- PMC: articles
- PubMed: articles
- NCBI: proteins

In enzymology, 4-phosphoerythronate dehydogenase (EC 1.1.1.290) is an enzyme that catalyzes the chemical reaction

4-phospho-D-erythronic acid
+ NAD^{+}
H^{+}
H^{+}
(R)-3-hydroxy-2-oxo-4-phosphonooxybutanoic acid
+ NADH

The two substrates of this enzyme are 4-phospho-D-erythronic acid and oxidised nicotinamide adenine dinucleotide (NAD^{+}). Its products are (R)-3-hydroxy-2-oxo-4-phosphonooxybutanoic acid, reduced NADH, and a proton.

This enzyme belongs to the family of oxidoreductases, specifically those acting on the CH-OH group of donor with NAD^{+} or NADP^{+} as acceptor. The systematic name of this enzyme class is 4-phospho-D-erythronate:NAD^{+} 2-oxidoreductase. Other names in common use include PdxB, PdxB 4PE dehydrogenase, and 4-O-phosphoerythronate dehydrogenase. This enzyme participates in vitamin B_{6} metabolism.

== Structural studies ==
As of late 2007, only one structure has been solved for this class of enzymes, with the PDB accession code 2O4C.
