= Alanopine dehydrogenase =

alanopine dehydrogenase

Identifiers
- EC no.: 1.5.1.17
- CAS no.: 71343-07-2

Databases
- IntEnz: IntEnz view
- BRENDA: BRENDA entry
- ExPASy: NiceZyme view
- KEGG: KEGG entry
- MetaCyc: metabolic pathway
- PRIAM: profile
- PDB structures: RCSB PDB PDBe PDBsum
- Gene Ontology: AmiGO / QuickGO
Search
- PMC: articles
- PubMed: articles
- NCBI: proteins

Alanopine dehydrogenase (EC 1.5.1.17) is an enzyme that catalyzes the chemical reaction

alanopine
+ NAD^{+}
H_{2}O
H^{+}
H_{2}O
H^{+}
alanine
+ NADH +
pyruvic acid

The three substrates of this enzyme are alanopine, oxidised nicotinamide adenine dinucleotide (NAD^{+}) and water. Its products are L-alanine, reduced NADH, pyruvic acid, and a proton.

This enzyme belongs to the family of oxidoreductases, specifically those acting on the CH-NH group of donors with NAD+ or NADP+ as acceptor. The systematic name of this enzyme class is 2,2'-iminodipropanoate:NAD+ oxidoreductase (L-alanine-forming). Other names in common use include ALPDH, alanopine[meso-N-(1-carboxyethyl)-alanine]dehydrogenase, meso-N-(1-carboxyethyl)-alanine:NAD+ oxidoreductase, alanopine: NAD+ oxidoreductase, ADH, and alanopine:NAD+ oxidoreductase.
