= L-erythro-3,5-diaminohexanoate dehydrogenase =

Identifiers
- EC no.: 1.4.1.11
- CAS no.: 37377-90-5

Databases
- IntEnz: IntEnz view
- BRENDA: BRENDA entry
- ExPASy: NiceZyme view
- KEGG: KEGG entry
- MetaCyc: metabolic pathway
- PRIAM: profile
- PDB structures: RCSB PDB PDBe PDBsum
- Gene Ontology: AmiGO / QuickGO
Search
- PMC: articles
- PubMed: articles
- NCBI: proteins

In enzymology, L-erythro-3,5-diaminohexanoate dehydrogenase (EC 1.4.1.11) is an enzyme that catalyzes the chemical reaction

3,5-diaminohexanoic acid
+ NAD^{+}
H_{2}O
H^{+}
H_{2}O
H^{+}
5-amino-3-oxohexanoic acid
+ NADH + NH_{3}

The three substrates of this enzyme are L-erythro-3,5-diaminohexanoic acid, water, and oxidised nicotinamide adenine dinucleotide (NAD^{+}). Its products are (S)-5-amino-3-oxohexanoic acid, reduced NADH, ammonia, and a proton.

This enzyme belongs to the family of oxidoreductases, specifically those acting on the CH-NH_{2} group of donors with NAD^{+} or NADP^{+} as acceptor. The systematic name of this enzyme class is L-erythro-3,5-diaminohexanoate:NAD+ oxidoreductase (deaminating). This enzyme is also called L-3,5-diaminohexanoate dehydrogenase. This enzyme participates in lysine degradation.
