= 3-(imidazol-5-yl)lactate dehydrogenase =

Class of enzymes

Identifiers
- EC no.: 1.1.1.111
- CAS no.: 37250-42-3

Databases
- IntEnz: IntEnz view
- BRENDA: BRENDA entry
- ExPASy: NiceZyme view
- KEGG: KEGG entry
- MetaCyc: metabolic pathway
- PRIAM: profile
- PDB structures: RCSB PDB PDBe PDBsum
- Gene Ontology: AmiGO / QuickGO
Search
- PMC: articles
- PubMed: articles
- NCBI: proteins

In enzymology, 3-(imidazol-5-yl)lactate dehydrogenase (EC 1.1.1.111) is an enzyme that catalyzes the chemical reaction

(S)-3-(imidazol-5-yl)lactic acid
+ NAD^{+}
H^{+}
H^{+}
imidazole-4-pyruvic acid
+ NADH

The two substrates of this enzyme are (S)-3-(imidazol-5-yl)lactic acid and oxidised nicotinamide adenine dinucleotide (NAD^{+}). Its products are imidazole-4-pyruvic acid, reduced NADH, and a proton. The enzyme can use the alternative cofactor, nicotinamide adenine dinucleotide phosphate.

This enzyme belongs to the family of oxidoreductases, specifically those acting on the CH-OH group of donor with NAD^{+} or NADP^{+} as acceptor. The systematic name of this enzyme class is (S)-3-(imidazol-5-yl)lactate:NAD(P)^{+} oxidoreductase. This enzyme is also called imidazol-5-yl lactate dehydrogenase.
