= 2,5-didehydrogluconate reductase =

Class of enzymes

Identifiers
- EC no.: 1.1.1.274
- CAS no.: 95725-95-4

Databases
- IntEnz: IntEnz view
- BRENDA: BRENDA entry
- ExPASy: NiceZyme view
- KEGG: KEGG entry
- MetaCyc: metabolic pathway
- PRIAM: profile
- PDB structures: RCSB PDB PDBe PDBsum
- Gene Ontology: AmiGO / QuickGO
Search
- PMC: articles
- PubMed: articles
- NCBI: proteins

In enzymology, 2,5-didehydrogluconate reductase (EC 1.1.1.274) is an enzyme that catalyzes the chemical reaction

2-dehydro-D-gluconic acid
+ NADP^{+}
H^{+}
H^{+}
2,5-didehydro-D-gluconic acid
+ NADPH

The two substrates of this enzyme are 2-dehydro-D-gluconic acid and oxidised nicotinamide adenine dinucleotide phosphate (NADP^{+}). Its products are 2,5-didehydro-D-gluconic acid, reduced NADPH, and a proton.

This enzyme belongs to the family of oxidoreductases, specifically those acting on the CH-OH group of donor with NAD^{+} or NADP^{+} as acceptor. The systematic name of this enzyme class is 2-dehydro-D-gluconate:NADP^{+} 2-oxidoreductase. Other names in common use include 2,5-diketo-D-gluconate reductase, and YqhE reductase.

== Structural studies ==
As of late 2007, only one structure has been solved for this class of enzymes, with the PDB accession code 1VP5.
