= Progesterone 11alpha-monooxygenase =

Catalyzing enzyme

progesterone 11-alpha-monooxygenase

Identifiers
- EC no.: 1.14.14.197
- CAS no.: 37256-77-2

Databases
- IntEnz: IntEnz view
- BRENDA: BRENDA entry
- ExPASy: NiceZyme view
- KEGG: KEGG entry
- MetaCyc: metabolic pathway
- PRIAM: profile
- PDB structures: RCSB PDB PDBe PDBsum
- Gene Ontology: AmiGO / QuickGO
Search
- PMC: articles
- PubMed: articles
- NCBI: proteins

In enzymology, a progesterone 11alpha-monooxygenase (EC 1.14.14.197) is an enzyme that catalyzes the chemical reaction

progesterone + AH_{2} + O_{2} $\rightleftharpoons$ 11alpha-hydroxyprogesterone + A + H_{2}O

The 3 substrates of this enzyme are progesterone, AH2, and O_{2}, whereas its 3 products are 11alpha-hydroxyprogesterone, A, and H_{2}O.

This enzyme belongs to the family of oxidoreductases, specifically those acting on paired donors, with O2 as oxidant and incorporation or reduction of oxygen. The oxygen incorporated need not be derive from O miscellaneous. The systematic name of this enzyme class is progesterone,hydrogen-donor:oxygen oxidoreductase (11alpha-hydroxylating). This enzyme is also called progesterone 11alpha-hydroxylase. This enzyme participates in c21-steroid hormone metabolism.
