= 2,5-dihydroxypyridine 5,6-dioxygenase =

Class of enzymes

Identifiers
- EC no.: 1.13.11.9
- CAS no.: 9029-57-6

Databases
- IntEnz: IntEnz view
- BRENDA: BRENDA entry
- ExPASy: NiceZyme view
- KEGG: KEGG entry
- MetaCyc: metabolic pathway
- PRIAM: profile
- PDB structures: RCSB PDB PDBe PDBsum
- Gene Ontology: AmiGO / QuickGO
Search
- PMC: articles
- PubMed: articles
- NCBI: proteins

2,5-dihydroxypyridine 5,6-dioxygenase (EC 1.13.11.9) is an enzyme that catalyzes the chemical reaction

2,5-dihydroxypyridine
O_{2}
N-formylmaleamic acid

The two substrates of this enzyme are 2,5-dihydroxypyridine and oxygen. Its product is N-formylmaleamic acid.

This enzyme belongs to the family of oxidoreductases, specifically those acting on single donors with O_{2} as oxidant and incorporation of two atoms of oxygen into the substrate (oxygenases). The oxygen incorporated need not be derived from O_{2}. It employs one cofactor, iron.

This enzyme participates in nicotinate and nicotinamide metabolism.

== Nomenclature ==
The systematic name of this enzyme class is 2,5-dihydroxypyridine:oxygen 5,6-oxidoreductase. Other names in common use include 2,5-dihydroxypyridine oxygenase, and pyridine-2,5-diol dioxygenase.
