= 3-hydroxypimeloyl-CoA dehydrogenase =

Class of enzymes

Identifiers
- EC no.: 1.1.1.259

Databases
- IntEnz: IntEnz view
- BRENDA: BRENDA entry
- ExPASy: NiceZyme view
- KEGG: KEGG entry
- MetaCyc: metabolic pathway
- PRIAM: profile
- PDB structures: RCSB PDB PDBe PDBsum
- Gene Ontology: AmiGO / QuickGO
Search
- PMC: articles
- PubMed: articles
- NCBI: proteins

In enzymology, 3-hydroxypimeloyl-CoA dehydrogenase (EC 1.1.1.259) is an enzyme that catalyzes the chemical reaction

3-hydroxypimeloyl-CoA
R=(CH_{2})_{3}CO_{2}H
+ NAD^{+}
H^{+}
H^{+}
3-oxopimeloyl-CoA
R=(CH_{2})_{3}CO_{2}H
+ NADH

The two substrates of this enzyme are 3-hydroxypimeloyl-CoA and oxidised nicotinamide adenine dinucleotide (NAD^{+}). Its products are 3-oxopimeloyl-CoA, reduced NADH, and a proton.

This enzyme belongs to the family of oxidoreductases, specifically those acting on the CH-OH group of donor with NAD^{+} or NADP^{+} as acceptor. The systematic name of this enzyme class is 3-hydroxypimeloyl-CoA:NAD^{+} oxidoreductase. This enzyme participates in benzoate degradation via coa ligation.
