= Dibenzothiophene dihydrodiol dehydrogenase =

Class of enzymes

dibenzothiophene dihydrodiol dehydrogenase

Identifiers
- EC no.: 1.3.1.60

Databases
- IntEnz: IntEnz view
- BRENDA: BRENDA entry
- ExPASy: NiceZyme view
- KEGG: KEGG entry
- MetaCyc: metabolic pathway
- PRIAM: profile
- PDB structures: RCSB PDB PDBe PDBsum
- Gene Ontology: AmiGO / QuickGO
Search
- PMC: articles
- PubMed: articles
- NCBI: proteins

In enzymology, dibenzothiophene dihydrodiol dehydrogenase (EC 1.3.1.60) is an enzyme that catalyzes the chemical reaction

cis-1,2-dihydroxy-1,2-dihydrodibenzothiophene
+ NAD^{+}
H^{+}
H^{+}
1,2-dihydroxydibenzothiophene
+ NADH

The two substrates of this enzyme are cis-1,2-dihydroxy-1,2-dihydrodibenzothiophene and oxidised nicotinamide adenine dinucleotide (NAD^{+}). Its products are 1,2-dihydroxydibenzothiophene, reduced NADH, and a proton.

This enzyme belongs to the family of oxidoreductases, specifically those acting on the CH-CH group of donor with NAD+ or NADP+ as acceptor. The systematic name of this enzyme class is cis-1,2-dihydroxy-1,2-dihydrodibenzothiophene:NAD+ oxidoreductase.
