= Phenylalanine 2-monooxygenase =

Identifiers
- EC no.: 1.13.12.9
- CAS no.: 84012-76-0

Databases
- IntEnz: IntEnz view
- BRENDA: BRENDA entry
- ExPASy: NiceZyme view
- KEGG: KEGG entry
- MetaCyc: metabolic pathway
- PRIAM: profile
- PDB structures: RCSB PDB PDBe PDBsum
- Gene Ontology: AmiGO / QuickGO
Search
- PMC: articles
- PubMed: articles
- NCBI: proteins

Phenylalanine 2-monooxygenase (EC 1.13.12.9) is an enzyme that catalyzes the chemical reaction

phenylalanine
O_{2}
H_{2}O
benzeneacetamide
+ CO_{2}

The two substrates of this enzyme are L-phenylalanine and oxygen. Its products are benzeneacetamide, carbon dioxide, and water.

This enzyme belongs to the family of oxidoreductases, specifically those acting on single donors with O_{2} as oxidant and incorporation of two atoms of oxygen into the substrate (oxygenases). The oxygen incorporated need not be derived from O with incorporation of one atom of oxygen (internal monooxygenases o internal mixed-function oxidases). The systematic name of this enzyme class is L-phenylalanine:oxygen 2-oxidoreductase (decarboxylating). Other names in common use include L-phenylalanine oxidase (deaminating and decarboxylating), and phenylalanine (deaminating, decarboxylating)oxidase. This enzyme participates in phenylalanine metabolism.
