= 1,5-anhydro-D-fructose reductase (1,5-anhydro-D-mannitol-forming) =

Enzyme in the family of oxidoreductases

Identifiers
- EC no.: 1.1.1.292

Databases
- IntEnz: IntEnz view
- BRENDA: BRENDA entry
- ExPASy: NiceZyme view
- KEGG: KEGG entry
- MetaCyc: metabolic pathway
- PRIAM: profile
- PDB structures: RCSB PDB PDBe PDBsum
Search
- PMC: articles
- PubMed: articles
- NCBI: proteins

In enzymology, 1,5-anhydro-D-fructose reductase (1,5-anhydro-D-mannitol-forming) (EC 1.1.1.292) is an enzyme that catalyzes the chemical reaction

1,5-anhydro-D-mannitol
+ NADP^{+}
H^{+}
H^{+}
1,5-anhydro-D-fructose
+ NADPH

The two substrates of this enzyme are 1,5-anhydro-D-mannitol and oxidised nicotinamide adenine dinucleotide phosphate (NADP^{+}). Its products are 1,5-anhydro-D-fructose, reduced NADPH, and a proton.

This enzyme belongs to the common family of oxidoreductases, specifically those acting on the CH-OH group of donor with NAD^{+} or NADP^{+} as acceptor. The systematic name of this enzyme class is 1,5-anhydro-D-mannitol:NADP^{+} oxidoreductase. Other names in common use include 1,5-anhydro-D-fructose reductase (ambiguous), and AFR.
