= Peptide-tryptophan 2,3-dioxygenase =

peptide-tryptophan 2,3-dioxygenase

Identifiers
- EC no.: 1.13.11.26
- CAS no.: 37256-64-7

Databases
- IntEnz: IntEnz view
- BRENDA: BRENDA entry
- ExPASy: NiceZyme view
- KEGG: KEGG entry
- MetaCyc: metabolic pathway
- PRIAM: profile
- PDB structures: RCSB PDB PDBe PDBsum
- Gene Ontology: AmiGO / QuickGO
Search
- PMC: articles
- PubMed: articles
- NCBI: proteins

In enzymology, a peptide-tryptophan 2,3-dioxygenase (EC 1.13.11.26) is an enzyme that catalyzes the chemical reaction

peptide tryptophan + O_{2} $\rightleftharpoons$ peptide formylkynurenine

Thus, the two substrates of this enzyme are peptide tryptophan and O_{2}, whereas its product is peptide formylkynurenine.

This enzyme belongs to the family of oxidoreductases, specifically those acting on single donors with O_{2} as oxidant and incorporation of two atoms of oxygen into the substrate (oxygenases). The oxygen incorporated need not be derived from O_{2}. The systematic name of this enzyme class is peptide-tryptophan:oxygen 2,3-oxidoreductase (decyclizing). Other names in common use include pyrrolooxygenase, peptidyltryptophan 2,3-dioxygenase, and tryptophan pyrrolooxygenase.
