= 4-(hydroxymethyl)benzenesulfonate dehydrogenase =

Class of enzymes

4-(hydroxymethyl)benzene-sulfonate dehydrogenase

Identifiers
- EC no.: 1.1.1.257
- CAS no.: 167973-64-0

Databases
- BRENDA: enzyme data
- ExPASy: NiceZyme view
- KEGG: enzyme entry
- MetaCyc: metabolic pathway
- Rhea: reactions
- PDB structures: RCSB PDB PDBe PDBsum
- Gene Ontology: AmiGO / QuickGO
Search
- PMC: articles
- PubMed: articles
- NCBI: proteins

In enzymology, 4-(hydroxymethyl)benzenesulfonate dehydrogenase (EC 1.1.1.257) is an enzyme that catalyzes the chemical reaction

+ NAD^{+}
H^{+}
H^{+}
+ NADH

The two substrates of this enzyme are 4-(hydroxymethyl)benzenesulfonic acid and oxidised nicotinamide adenine dinucleotide (NAD^{+}). Its products are 4-formylbenzenesulfonic acid, reduced NADH, and a proton.

This enzyme belongs to the family of oxidoreductases, specifically those acting on the CH-OH group of donor with NAD^{+} or NADP^{+} as acceptor. The systematic name of this enzyme class is 4-(hydroxymethyl)benzenesulfonate:NAD^{+} oxidoreductase. This enzyme participates in 2,4-dichlorobenzoate degradation.
