= Sequoyitol dehydrogenase =

sequoyitol dehydrogenase

Identifiers
- EC no.: 1.1.1.143
- CAS no.: 37250-72-9

Databases
- IntEnz: IntEnz view
- BRENDA: BRENDA entry
- ExPASy: NiceZyme view
- KEGG: KEGG entry
- MetaCyc: metabolic pathway
- PRIAM: profile
- PDB structures: RCSB PDB PDBe PDBsum
- Gene Ontology: AmiGO / QuickGO
Search
- PMC: articles
- PubMed: articles
- NCBI: proteins

In enzymology, sequoyitol dehydrogenase (EC 1.1.1.143) is an enzyme that catalyzes the chemical reaction

sequoyitol
+ NAD^{+}
H^{+}
H^{+}
2D-5-O-methyl-2,3,5/4,6-pentahydroxycyclohexanone
+ NADH

The two substrates of this enzyme are sequoyitol and oxidised nicotinamide adenine dinucleotide (NAD^{+}). Its products are 2D-5-O-methyl-2,3,5/4,6-pentahydroxycyclohexanone, reduced NADH, and a proton.

This enzyme belongs to the family of oxidoreductases, specifically those acting on the CH-OH group of donor with NAD^{+} or NADP^{+} as acceptor. The systematic name of this enzyme class is 5-O-methyl-myo-inositol:NAD^{+} oxidoreductase. This enzyme is also called D-pinitol dehydrogenase.
