= N6-methyl-lysine oxidase =

Identifiers
- EC no.: 1.5.3.4
- CAS no.: 37256-28-3

Databases
- IntEnz: IntEnz view
- BRENDA: BRENDA entry
- ExPASy: NiceZyme view
- KEGG: KEGG entry
- MetaCyc: metabolic pathway
- PRIAM: profile
- PDB structures: RCSB PDB PDBe PDBsum
- Gene Ontology: AmiGO / QuickGO
Search
- PMC: articles
- PubMed: articles
- NCBI: proteins

N6-methyl-lysine oxidase (EC 1.5.3.4) is an enzyme that catalyzes the chemical reaction

N6-methyllysine
+ H_{2}O
O_{2}
H_{2}O_{2}
lysine
+ H_{2}C=O

The three substrates of this enzyme are N6-methyllysine, water, and oxygen. Its products are L-lysine, hydrogen peroxide and formaldehyde.

This enzyme belongs to the family of oxidoreductases, specifically those acting on the CH-NH group of donors with oxygen as acceptor. The systematic name of this enzyme class is N6-methyl-L-lysine:oxygen oxidoreductase (demethylating). Other names in common use include epsilon-alkyl-L-lysine:oxygen oxidoreductase, N6-methyllysine oxidase, epsilon-N-methyllysine demethylase, epsilon-alkyllysinase, and 6-N-methyl-L-lysine:oxygen oxidoreductase (demethylating).
