= Galactitol-1-phosphate 5-dehydrogenase =

galactitol-1-phosphate 5-dehydrogenase

Identifiers
- EC no.: 1.1.1.251
- CAS no.: 167618-25-9

Databases
- BRENDA: enzyme data
- ExPASy: NiceZyme view
- KEGG: enzyme entry
- MetaCyc: metabolic pathway
- Rhea: reactions
- PDB structures: RCSB PDB PDBe PDBsum
- Gene Ontology: AmiGO / QuickGO
Search
- PMC: articles
- PubMed: articles
- NCBI: proteins

In enzymology, galactitol-1-phosphate 5-dehydrogenase (EC 1.1.1.251) is an enzyme that catalyzes the chemical reaction

galactitol-1-phosphate
+ NAD^{+}
H^{+}
H^{+}
L-tagatose 6-phosphate
+ NADH

The two substrates of this enzyme are galactitol-1-phosphate and oxidised nicotinamide adenine dinucleotide (NAD^{+}). Its 3 products are L-tagatose 6-phosphate (shown in its open-chain keto form), reduced NADH, and a proton.

This enzyme belongs to the family of oxidoreductases, specifically those acting on the CH-OH group of donor with NAD^{+} or NADP^{+} as acceptor. The systematic name of this enzyme class is galactitol-1-phosphate:NAD^{+} oxidoreductase. This enzyme participates in galactose metabolism. It employs one cofactor, zinc.
