= D-lactate dehydrogenase (cytochrome c-553) =

Class of enzymes

Identifiers
- EC no.: 1.1.2.5
- CAS no.: 37250-79-6

Databases
- IntEnz: IntEnz view
- BRENDA: BRENDA entry
- ExPASy: NiceZyme view
- KEGG: KEGG entry
- MetaCyc: metabolic pathway
- PRIAM: profile
- PDB structures: RCSB PDB PDBe PDBsum
- Gene Ontology: AmiGO / QuickGO
Search
- PMC: articles
- PubMed: articles
- NCBI: proteins

In enzymology, D-lactate dehydrogenase (cytochrome c-553) (EC 1.1.2.5) is an enzyme that catalyzes the chemical reaction

(R)-lactic acid
Fe^{3+}
Fe^{2+}
Fe^{3+}
Fe^{2+}
pyruvic acid
+ 2 H^{+}

The substrate of this enzyme is (R)-lactic acid, which is acted on by two equivalents of the cofactor, ferrocytochrome c-553, which oxidises the hydroxy group to a keto group, giving pyruvic acid, while the cofactor's iron is reduced.

This enzyme belongs to the family of oxidoreductases, to be specific those acting on the CH-OH group of donor with a cytochrome as acceptor. The systematic name of this enzyme class is (R)-lactate:ferricytochrome-c-553 2-oxidoreductase. This enzyme participates in pyruvate metabolism.
