= 3-Hydroxy-9,10-secoandrosta-1,3,5(10)-triene-9,17-dione monooxygenase =

Class of enzymes

3-hydroxy-9,10-secoandrosta-1,3,5(10)-triene-9,17-dione monooxygenase

Identifiers
- EC no.: 1.14.14.12

Databases
- IntEnz: IntEnz view
- BRENDA: BRENDA entry
- ExPASy: NiceZyme view
- KEGG: KEGG entry
- MetaCyc: metabolic pathway
- PRIAM: profile
- PDB structures: RCSB PDB PDBe PDBsum
Search
- PMC: articles
- PubMed: articles
- NCBI: proteins

3-hydroxy-9,10-secoandrosta-1,3,5(10)-triene-9,17-dione monooxygenase (EC 1.14.14.12, HsaA) is an enzyme with systematic name 3-hydroxy-9,10-secoandrosta-1,3,5(10)-triene-9,17-dione,FMNH2:oxygen oxidoreductase. This enzyme catalyses the following chemical reaction:

3-hydroxy-9,10-secoandrosta-1,3,5(10)-triene-9,17-dione + FMNH_{2} + O_{2} $\rightleftharpoons$ 3,4-dihydroxy-9,10-secoandrosta-1,3,5(10)-triene-9,17-dione + FMN + H_{2}O

This bacterial enzyme participates in the degradation of several steroids, including cholesterol and testosterone.
