= 3-methyleneoxindole reductase =

Class of enzymes

Identifiers
- EC no.: 1.3.1.17
- CAS no.: 37255-29-1

Databases
- IntEnz: IntEnz view
- BRENDA: BRENDA entry
- ExPASy: NiceZyme view
- KEGG: KEGG entry
- MetaCyc: metabolic pathway
- PRIAM: profile
- PDB structures: RCSB PDB PDBe PDBsum
- Gene Ontology: AmiGO / QuickGO
Search
- PMC: articles
- PubMed: articles
- NCBI: proteins

In enzymology, 3-methyleneoxindole reductase (EC 1.3.1.17) is an enzyme that catalyzes the chemical reaction

3-methyloxindole
+ NADP^{+}
H^{+}
H^{+}
3-methyleneoxindole
+ NADPH

The two substrates of this enzyme are 3-methyloxindole and oxidised nicotinamide adenine dinucleotide phosphate (NADP^{+}). Its products are 3-methyleneoxindole, reduced NADPH, and a proton.

This enzyme belongs to the family of oxidoreductases, specifically those acting on the CH-CH group of donor with NAD+ or NADP+ as acceptor. The systematic name of this enzyme class is 3-methyl-1,3-dihydroindol-2-one:NADP+ oxidoreductase. This enzyme is also termed 3-methyloxindole:NADP+ oxidoreductase.
