= Crotonyl-CoA reductase =

Class of enzymes

Identifiers
- EC no.: 1.3.1.86

Databases
- IntEnz: IntEnz view
- BRENDA: BRENDA entry
- ExPASy: NiceZyme view
- KEGG: KEGG entry
- MetaCyc: metabolic pathway
- PRIAM: profile
- PDB structures: RCSB PDB PDBe PDBsum
Search
- PMC: articles
- PubMed: articles
- NCBI: proteins

Crotonyl-CoA reductase (EC 1.3.1.86, butyryl-CoA dehydrogenase, butyryl dehydrogenase, unsaturated acyl-CoA reductase, ethylene reductase, enoyl-coenzyme A reductase, unsaturated acyl coenzyme A reductase, butyryl coenzyme A dehydrogenase, short-chain acyl CoA dehydrogenase, short-chain acyl-coenzyme A dehydrogenase, 3-hydroxyacyl CoA reductase, butanoyl-CoA:(acceptor) 2,3-oxidoreductase, CCR) is an enzyme with systematic name butanoyl-CoA:NADP^{+} 2,3-oxidoreductase. This enzyme catalyses the following chemical reaction

butanoyl-CoA + NADP^{+} $\rightleftharpoons$ (E)-but-2-enoyl-CoA + NADPH + H^{+}

This enzyme catalyses the reaction in the reverse direction.
