= L-lysine oxidase =

Identifiers
- EC no.: 1.4.3.14
- CAS no.: 70132-14-8

Databases
- IntEnz: IntEnz view
- BRENDA: BRENDA entry
- ExPASy: NiceZyme view
- KEGG: KEGG entry
- MetaCyc: metabolic pathway
- PRIAM: profile
- PDB structures: RCSB PDB PDBe PDBsum
- Gene Ontology: AmiGO / QuickGO
Search
- PMC: articles
- PubMed: articles
- NCBI: proteins

In enzymology, L-lysine oxidase (EC 1.4.3.14) is an enzyme that catalyzes the chemical reaction

L-lysine
+ H_{2}O
O_{2}
H_{2}O_{2}
O_{2}
H_{2}O_{2}
6-amino-2-oxohexanoic acid
+ NH_{3}

The three substrates of this enzyme are L-lysine, water, and oxygen. Its products are 6-amino-2-oxohexanoic acid, hydrogen peroxide, and ammonia.

This enzyme belongs to the family of oxidoreductases, specifically those acting on the CH-NH_{2} group of donors with oxygen as acceptor. The systematic name of this enzyme class is L-lysine:oxygen 2-oxidoreductase (deaminating). Other names in common use include L-lysine alpha-oxidase, and L-lysyl-alpha-oxidase. This enzyme participates in lysine degradation.
