= Tryptophan alpha,beta-oxidase =

Class of enzymes

tryptophan alpha,beta-oxidase

Identifiers
- EC no.: 1.3.3.10
- CAS no.: 156859-19-7

Databases
- BRENDA: enzyme data
- ExPASy: NiceZyme view
- KEGG: enzyme entry
- MetaCyc: metabolic pathway
- Rhea: reactions
- PDB structures: RCSB PDB PDBe PDBsum
- Gene Ontology: AmiGO / QuickGO
Search
- PMC: articles
- PubMed: articles
- NCBI: proteins

In enzymology, tryptophan alpha,beta-oxidase (EC 1.3.3.10) is an enzyme that catalyzes the chemical reaction

tryptophan
O_{2}
H_{2}O_{2}
O_{2}
H_{2}O_{2}
α,β-didehydrotryptophan

The two substrates of this enzyme are L-tryptophan and oxygen. Its products are α,β-didehydrotryptophan and hydrogen peroxide.

This enzyme belongs to the family of oxidoreductases, specifically those acting on the CH-CH group of donor with oxygen as acceptor. The systematic name of this enzyme class is L-tryptophan:oxygen alpha,beta-oxidoreductase. Other names in common use include L-tryptophan 2',3'-oxidase, and L-tryptophan alpha,beta-dehydrogenase. It employs one cofactor, heme.
