= Lysine 6-dehydrogenase =

Class of enzymes

Identifiers
- EC no.: 1.4.1.18
- CAS no.: 89400-30-6

Databases
- IntEnz: IntEnz view
- BRENDA: BRENDA entry
- ExPASy: NiceZyme view
- KEGG: KEGG entry
- MetaCyc: metabolic pathway
- PRIAM: profile
- PDB structures: RCSB PDB PDBe PDBsum
Search
- PMC: articles
- PubMed: articles
- NCBI: proteins

Lysine 6-dehydrogenase (EC 1.4.1.18, L-lysine epsilon-dehydrogenase, L-lysine 6-dehydrogenase, LysDH) is an enzyme with systematic name L-lysine:NAD^{+} 6-oxidoreductase (deaminating). This enzyme catalyses the following overall chemical reaction

L-lysine
+ NAD^{+}
NH_{3} + H^{+}
NH_{3} + H^{+}
(1)
+ NADH

The two substrates of this enzyme are L-lysine and oxidised nicotinamide adenine dinucleotide (NAD^{+}). Its products are (2S)-2,3,4,5-tetrahydropyridine-2-carboxylic acid (1), ammonia, reduced NADH, and a proton. The enzyme is highly specific for L-lysine as substrate, although S-(2-aminoethyl)-L-cysteine can act as a substrate, but more slowly.
