= Isopropanol dehydrogenase (NADP+) =

Class of enzymes

isopropanol dehydrogenase (NADP+)

Identifiers
- EC no.: 1.1.1.80
- CAS no.: 37250-18-3

Databases
- IntEnz: IntEnz view
- BRENDA: BRENDA entry
- ExPASy: NiceZyme view
- KEGG: KEGG entry
- MetaCyc: metabolic pathway
- PRIAM: profile
- PDB structures: RCSB PDB PDBe PDBsum
- Gene Ontology: AmiGO / QuickGO
Search
- PMC: articles
- PubMed: articles
- NCBI: proteins

In enzymology, isopropanol dehydrogenase (NADP^{+}) (EC 1.1.1.80) is an enzyme that catalyzes the chemical reaction

isopropyl alcohol
+ NADP^{+}
H^{+}
H^{+}
acetone
+ NADPH

The two substrates of this enzyme are isopropanol and oxidised nicotinamide adenine dinucleotide phosphate (NADP^{+}). Its products are acetone, reduced NADPH, and a proton.

This enzyme belongs to the family of oxidoreductases, specifically those acting on the CH-OH group of donor with NAD^{+} or NADP^{+} as acceptor. The systematic name of this enzyme class is propan-2-ol:NADP^{+} oxidoreductase. This enzyme participates in propanoate metabolism.
