= Hydroxyphytanate oxidase =

hydroxyphytanate oxidase

Identifiers
- EC no.: 1.1.3.27
- CAS no.: 114454-12-5

Databases
- IntEnz: IntEnz view
- BRENDA: BRENDA entry
- ExPASy: NiceZyme view
- KEGG: KEGG entry
- MetaCyc: metabolic pathway
- PRIAM: profile
- PDB structures: RCSB PDB PDBe PDBsum
- Gene Ontology: AmiGO / QuickGO
Search
- PMC: articles
- PubMed: articles
- NCBI: proteins

In enzymology, a hydroxyphytanate oxidase (EC 1.1.3.27) is an enzyme that catalyzes the chemical reaction

L-2-hydroxyphytanate + O_{2} $\rightleftharpoons$ 2-oxophytanate + H_{2}O_{2}

Thus, the two substrates of this enzyme are L-2-hydroxyphytanate and O_{2}, whereas its two products are 2-oxophytanate and H_{2}O_{2}.

This enzyme belongs to the family of oxidoreductases, specifically those acting on the CH-OH group of donor with oxygen as acceptor. The systematic name of this enzyme class is L-2-hydroxyphytanate:oxygen 2-oxidoreductase. This enzyme is also called L-2-hydroxyphytanate:oxygen 2-oxidoreductase.
