= Lysine dehydrogenase =

lysine dehydrogenase

Identifiers
- EC no.: 1.4.1.15
- CAS no.: 68073-29-0

Databases
- IntEnz: IntEnz view
- BRENDA: BRENDA entry
- ExPASy: NiceZyme view
- KEGG: KEGG entry
- MetaCyc: metabolic pathway
- PRIAM: profile
- PDB structures: RCSB PDB PDBe PDBsum
- Gene Ontology: AmiGO / QuickGO
Search
- PMC: articles
- PubMed: articles
- NCBI: proteins

In enzymology, lysine dehydrogenase (EC 1.4.1.15) is an enzyme that catalyzes the chemical reaction

L-lysine
+ NAD^{+}
NH_{3} + H^{+}
NH_{3} + H^{+}
1-piperideine-2-carboxylic acid
+ NADH

The two substrates of this enzyme are L-lysine and oxidised nicotinamide adenine dinucleotide (NAD^{+}). Its products are 1-piperideine-2-carboxylic acid, ammonia, reduced NADH, and a proton.

This enzyme belongs to the family of oxidoreductases, specifically those acting on the CH-NH2 group of donors with NAD+ or NADP+ as acceptor. The systematic name of this enzyme class is L-lysine:NAD+ oxidoreductase (deaminating, cyclizing).
