= L-idonate 5-dehydrogenase =

Identifiers
- EC no.: 1.1.1.264

Databases
- IntEnz: IntEnz view
- BRENDA: BRENDA entry
- ExPASy: NiceZyme view
- KEGG: KEGG entry
- MetaCyc: metabolic pathway
- PRIAM: profile
- PDB structures: RCSB PDB PDBe PDBsum
- Gene Ontology: AmiGO / QuickGO
Search
- PMC: articles
- PubMed: articles
- NCBI: proteins

In enzymology, L-idonate 5-dehydrogenase (EC 1.1.1.264) is an enzyme that catalyzes the chemical reaction

L-idonic acid
+ NAD^{+}
H^{+}
H^{+}
5-oxo-D-gluconic acid
+ NADH

The two substrates of this enzyme are L-idonic acid and oxidised nicotinamide adenine dinucleotide (NAD^{+}). Its products are 5-oxo-D-gluconic acid, reduced NADH, and a proton. The enzyme can also use the alternative cofactor, nicotinamide adenine dinucleotide phosphate.

This enzyme belongs to the family of oxidoreductases, specifically those acting on the CH-OH group of donor with NAD^{+} or NADP^{+} as acceptor. The systematic name of this enzyme class is L-idonate:NAD(P)^{+} oxidoreductase.
