= Geissoschizine dehydrogenase =

Class of enzymes

geissoschizine dehydrogenase

Identifiers
- EC no.: 1.3.1.36
- CAS no.: 84399-94-0

Databases
- IntEnz: IntEnz view
- BRENDA: BRENDA entry
- ExPASy: NiceZyme view
- KEGG: KEGG entry
- MetaCyc: metabolic pathway
- PRIAM: profile
- PDB structures: RCSB PDB PDBe PDBsum
- Gene Ontology: AmiGO / QuickGO
Search
- PMC: articles
- PubMed: articles
- NCBI: proteins

In enzymology, a geissoschizine dehydrogenase (EC 1.3.1.36) is an enzyme that catalyzes the chemical reaction

geissoschizine + NADP^{+} $\rightleftharpoons$ 4,21-didehydrogeissoschizine + NADPH

Thus, the two substrates of this enzyme are geissoschizine and NADP^{+}, whereas its two products are 4,21-didehydrogeissoschizine and NADPH.

This enzyme belongs to the family of oxidoreductases, specifically those acting on the CH-CH group of donor with NAD+ or NADP+ as acceptor. The systematic name of this enzyme class is geissoschizine:NADP+ 4,21-oxidoreductase. This enzyme participates in indole and ipecac alkaloid biosynthesis.
