= Sulfopropanediol 3-dehydrogenase =

Identifiers
- EC no.: 1.1.1.308

Databases
- IntEnz: IntEnz view
- BRENDA: BRENDA entry
- ExPASy: NiceZyme view
- KEGG: KEGG entry
- MetaCyc: metabolic pathway
- PRIAM: profile
- PDB structures: RCSB PDB PDBe PDBsum
Search
- PMC: articles
- PubMed: articles
- NCBI: proteins

Sulfopropanediol 3-dehydrogenase (EC 1.1.1.308, DHPS 3-dehydrogenase (sulfolactate forming), 2,3-dihydroxypropane-1-sulfonate 3-dehydrogenase (sulfolactate forming), dihydroxypropanesulfonate 3-dehydrogenase, hpsN (gene)) is an enzyme with systematic name (R)-2,3-dihydroxypropane-1-sulfonate:NAD^{+} 3-oxidoreductase. This enzyme catalyses the following chemical reaction:

(2R)-3-sulfopropanediol
+ 2 NAD^{+}
H_{2}O
2 H^{+}
H_{2}O
2 H^{+}
(R)-2-hydroxy-3-sulfopropanoic acid
+ 2 NADH

The enzyme is involved in degradation of (R)-2,3-dihydroxypropanesulfonate.
