= Serine 3-dehydrogenase =

serine 3-dehydrogenase

Identifiers
- EC no.: 1.1.1.276
- CAS no.: 9038-55-5

Databases
- IntEnz: IntEnz view
- BRENDA: BRENDA entry
- ExPASy: NiceZyme view
- KEGG: KEGG entry
- MetaCyc: metabolic pathway
- PRIAM: profile
- PDB structures: RCSB PDB PDBe PDBsum
- Gene Ontology: AmiGO / QuickGO
Search
- PMC: articles
- PubMed: articles
- NCBI: proteins

In enzymology, serine 3-dehydrogenase (EC 1.1.1.276) is an enzyme that catalyzes the chemical reaction

L-serine
+ NADP^{+}
H^{+}
H^{+}
L-3-oxo-alanine
+ NADH

The two substrates of this enzyme are L-serine and oxidised nicotinamide adenine dinucleotide phosphate (NADP^{+}). Its products are L-3-oxo-alanine, reduced NADPH, and a proton.

This enzyme belongs to the family of oxidoreductases, specifically those acting on the CH-OH group of donor with NAD^{+} or NADP^{+} as acceptor. The systematic name of this enzyme class is L-serine:NADP^{+} 3-oxidoreductase.
