= UDP-N-acetyl-2-amino-2-deoxyglucuronate dehydrogenase =

Class of enzymes

Identifiers
- EC no.: 1.1.1.335

Databases
- IntEnz: IntEnz view
- BRENDA: BRENDA entry
- ExPASy: NiceZyme view
- KEGG: KEGG entry
- MetaCyc: metabolic pathway
- PRIAM: profile
- PDB structures: RCSB PDB PDBe PDBsum
Search
- PMC: articles
- PubMed: articles
- NCBI: proteins

UDP-N-acetyl-2-amino-2-deoxyglucuronate dehydrogenase (EC 1.1.1.335, WlbA, WbpB) is an enzyme with systematic name UDP-N-acetyl-2-amino-2-deoxy-alpha-D-glucuronate:NAD^{+} 3-oxidoreductase. This enzyme catalyses the following chemical reaction:

UDP-N-acetyl-2-amino-2-deoxy-alpha-D-glucuronate + NAD^{+} $\rightleftharpoons$ UDP-2-acetamido-2-deoxy-alpha-D-ribo-hex-3-uluronate + NADH + H^{+}

This enzyme participates in the biosynthesis of lipopolysaccharide UDP-alpha-D-ManNAc3NAcA.
