= Decaprenylphospho-beta-D-erythro-pentofuranosid-2-ulose 2-reductase =

Identifiers
- EC no.: 1.1.1.333

Databases
- IntEnz: IntEnz view
- BRENDA: BRENDA entry
- ExPASy: NiceZyme view
- KEGG: KEGG entry
- MetaCyc: metabolic pathway
- PRIAM: profile
- PDB structures: RCSB PDB PDBe PDBsum
Search
- PMC: articles
- PubMed: articles
- NCBI: proteins

Decaprenylphospho-beta-D-erythro-pentofuranosid-2-ulose 2-reductase (EC 1.1.1.333, decaprenylphospho-beta-D-ribofuranose 2'-epimerase, Rv3791, DprE2) is an enzyme with systematic name trans,octacis-decaprenylphospho-beta-D-arabinofuranose:NAD^{+} 2-oxidoreductase. This enzyme catalyses the following chemical reaction

trans,octacis-decaprenylphospho-beta-D-arabinofuranose + NAD^{+} $\rightleftharpoons$ trans,octacis-decaprenylphospho-beta-D-erythro-pentofuranosid-2-ulose + NADH + H^{+}

The reaction is catalysed in the reverse direction.
