= Rifamycin-B oxidase =

Enzyme

rifamycin-B oxidase

Identifiers
- EC no.: 1.10.3.6
- CAS no.: 84932-52-5

Databases
- IntEnz: IntEnz view
- BRENDA: BRENDA entry
- ExPASy: NiceZyme view
- KEGG: KEGG entry
- MetaCyc: metabolic pathway
- PRIAM: profile
- PDB structures: RCSB PDB PDBe PDBsum
- Gene Ontology: AmiGO / QuickGO
Search
- PMC: articles
- PubMed: articles
- NCBI: proteins

In enzymology, a rifamycin-B oxidase (EC 1.10.3.6) is an enzyme that catalyzes the chemical reaction

rifamycin B + O_{2} $\rightleftharpoons$ rifamycin O + H_{2}O_{2}

Thus, the two substrates of this enzyme are rifamycin B and O_{2}, whereas its two products are rifamycin O and H_{2}O_{2}.

This enzyme belongs to the family of oxidoreductases, specifically those acting on diphenols and related substances as donor with oxygen as acceptor. The systematic name of this enzyme class is rifamycin-B:oxygen oxidoreductase. This enzyme is also called rifamycin B oxidase.
