= Acetylindoxyl oxidase =

Class of enzymes

acetylindoxyl oxidase

Identifiers
- EC no.: 1.7.3.2
- CAS no.: 9029-37-2

Databases
- IntEnz: IntEnz view
- BRENDA: BRENDA entry
- ExPASy: NiceZyme view
- KEGG: KEGG entry
- MetaCyc: metabolic pathway
- PRIAM: profile
- PDB structures: RCSB PDB PDBe PDBsum
- Gene Ontology: AmiGO / QuickGO
Search
- PMC: articles
- PubMed: articles
- NCBI: proteins

Acetylindoxyl oxidase (EC 1.7.3.2) is an enzyme that catalyzes the chemical reaction

N-acetylindoxyl + O_{2} $\rightleftharpoons$ N-acetylisatin + (?)

Thus, the two substrates of this enzyme are N-acetylindoxyl and oxygen, whereas its product is N-acetylisatin.

This enzyme belongs to the family of oxidoreductases, specifically those acting on other nitrogenous compounds as donors with oxygen as acceptor. The systematic name of this enzyme class is N-acetylindoxyl:oxygen oxidoreductase. This enzyme participates in tryptophan metabolism.
