= N8-acetylspermidine oxidase (propane-1,3-diamine-forming) =

N^{8}-acetylspermidine oxidase (propane-1,3-diamine-forming)

Identifiers
- EC no.: 1.5.3.15

Databases
- IntEnz: IntEnz view
- BRENDA: BRENDA entry
- ExPASy: NiceZyme view
- KEGG: KEGG entry
- MetaCyc: metabolic pathway
- PRIAM: profile
- PDB structures: RCSB PDB PDBe PDBsum
Search
- PMC: articles
- PubMed: articles
- NCBI: proteins

N^{8}-acetylspermidine oxidase (propane-1,3-diamine-forming) (EC 1.5.3.15) is an enzyme with systematic name N^{8}-acetylspermidine:oxygen oxidoreductase (propane-1,3-diamine-forming). This enzyme catalyses the following chemical reaction

N^{8}-acetylspermidine + O_{2} + H_{2}O $\rightleftharpoons$ propane-1,3-diamine + 4-acetamidobutanal + H_{2}O_{2}

This enzyme is also active n N^{1}-acetylspermine, and it has weak activity on N^{1},N^{12}-diacetylspermine.
