= UDP-N-acetyl-D-mannosamine dehydrogenase =

Class of enzymes

Identifiers
- EC no.: 1.1.1.336

Databases
- IntEnz: IntEnz view
- BRENDA: BRENDA entry
- ExPASy: NiceZyme view
- KEGG: KEGG entry
- MetaCyc: metabolic pathway
- PRIAM: profile
- PDB structures: RCSB PDB PDBe PDBsum
Search
- PMC: articles
- PubMed: articles
- NCBI: proteins

UDP-N-acetyl-D-mannosamine dehydrogenase (EC 1.1.1.336, UDP-ManNAc 6-dehydrogenase, wecC (gene)) is an enzyme with systematic name UDP-N-acetyl-alpha-D-mannosamine:NAD^{+} 6-oxidoreductase. This enzyme catalyses the following chemical reaction

UDP-N-acetyl-alpha-D-mannosamine + 2 NAD^{+} + H_{2}O $\rightleftharpoons$ UDP-N-acetyl-alpha-D-mannosaminuronate + 2 NADH + 2 H^{+}

This enzyme participates in acetamido sugar biosynthesis in bacteria and archaea.
