= Long-chain acyl-(acyl-carrier-protein) reductase =

Identifiers
- EC no.: 1.2.1.80

Databases
- IntEnz: IntEnz view
- BRENDA: BRENDA entry
- ExPASy: NiceZyme view
- KEGG: KEGG entry
- MetaCyc: metabolic pathway
- PRIAM: profile
- PDB structures: RCSB PDB PDBe PDBsum
Search
- PMC: articles
- PubMed: articles
- NCBI: proteins

Long-chain acyl-(acyl-carrier-protein) reductase (EC 1.2.1.80, long-chain acyl-[acp] reductase, fatty acyl-[acyl-carrier-protein] reductase, acyl-[acp] reductase) is an enzyme with systematic name long-chain-aldehyde:NAD(P)^{+} oxidoreductase (acyl-(acyl-carrier protein)-forming). This enzyme catalyses the following chemical reaction

a long-chain aldehyde + acyl-carrier protein + NAD(P)+ $\rightleftharpoons$ a long-chain acyl-[acyl-carrier protein] + NAD(P)H + H^{+}

This enzyme catalyses the reaction in the opposite direction.
