= Staphylopine dehydrogenase =

Identifiers
- EC no.: 1.5.1.52

Databases
- IntEnz: IntEnz view
- BRENDA: BRENDA entry
- ExPASy: NiceZyme view
- KEGG: KEGG entry
- MetaCyc: metabolic pathway
- PRIAM: profile
- PDB structures: RCSB PDB PDBe PDBsum
Search
- PMC: articles
- PubMed: articles
- NCBI: proteins

Staphylopine synthase (EC 1.5.1.52) is an enzyme that catalyzes NADPH-dependent reductive condensation of pyruvate to the intermediate (2S)-2-amino-4-{[(1R)-1-carboxy-2-(1H-imidazol-4-yl)ethyl]amino}butanoate, which is the last step in the biosynthesis of the metallophore staphylopine. The chemical reaction is:

H_{2}O + NADP^{+} + staphylopine = (2S)-2-amino-4-{[(1R)-1-carboxy-2-(1H-imidazol-4-yl)ethyl]amino}butanoate + H^{+} + NADPH + pyruvate

Alternative name(s): staphylopine dehydrogenase.
