= 3-Succinoylsemialdehyde-pyridine dehydrogenase =

Class of enzymes

Identifiers
- EC no.: 1.2.1.83

Databases
- IntEnz: IntEnz view
- BRENDA: BRENDA entry
- ExPASy: NiceZyme view
- KEGG: KEGG entry
- MetaCyc: metabolic pathway
- PRIAM: profile
- PDB structures: RCSB PDB PDBe PDBsum
Search
- PMC: articles
- PubMed: articles
- NCBI: proteins

3-Succinoylsemialdehyde-pyridine dehydrogenase (EC 1.2.1.83) is an enzyme with systematic name 4-oxo-4-(pyridin-3-yl)butanal:NADP^{+} oxidoreductase. This enzyme catalyses the following chemical reaction

4-oxo-4-(3-pyridinebutanal)
+ NADP^{+}
H_{2}O
H^{+}
H_{2}O
H^{+}
4-oxo-4-(pyridin-3-yl)butanoic acid
+ NADPH

The enzyme has been characterized from the soil bacterium Pseudomonas sp. HZN6, which degrades nicotine.
