= 2-Deoxy-scyllo-inosamine dehydrogenase =

Class of enzymes

2-deoxy-scyllo-inosamine dehydrogenase

Identifiers
- EC no.: 1.1.1.329

Databases
- BRENDA: enzyme data
- ExPASy: NiceZyme view
- KEGG: enzyme entry
- MetaCyc: metabolic pathway
- Rhea: reactions
- PDB structures: RCSB PDB PDBe PDBsum
Search
- PMC: articles
- PubMed: articles
- NCBI: proteins

2-deoxy-scyllo-inosamine dehydrogenase (EC 1.1.1.329, neoA (gene name), kanK (gene name)) is an enzyme with systematic name 2-deoxy-scyllo-inosamine:NAD(P)^{+} 1-oxidoreductase. This enzyme catalyses the following chemical reaction

2-deoxy-scyllo-inosamine
+ NAD^{+}
H^{+}
H^{+}
3-amino-2,3-dideoxy-scyllo-inosose
+ NADH

The enzyme can use the alternative cofactor, nicotinamide adenine dinucleotide phosphate and requires zinc.
