= Ent-cassa-12,15-diene 11-hydroxylase =

Monooxygenase enzyme

Identifiers
- EC no.: 1.14.14.112

Databases
- BRENDA: enzyme data
- ExPASy: NiceZyme view
- KEGG: enzyme entry
- MetaCyc: metabolic pathway
- Rhea: reactions
- PDB structures: RCSB PDB PDBe PDBsum
Search
- PMC: articles
- PubMed: articles
- NCBI: proteins

Ent-cassa-12,15-diene 11-hydroxylase (EC 1.14.14.112, Formerly EC 1.14.13.145, ent-cassadiene C11alpha-hydroxylase, CYP76M7) is an enzyme with systematic name ent-cassa-12,15-diene,NADPH:oxygen 11-oxidoreductase. This enzyme catalyses the following chemical reaction

ent-cassa-12,15-diene + O_{2} + NADPH + H^{+} $\rightleftharpoons$ ent-11beta-hydroxycassa-12,15-diene + NADP^{+} + H_{2}O

Ent-cassa-12,15-diene 11-hydroxylase requires cytochrome P450.
