= 8'-apo-beta-carotenoid 14',13'-cleaving dioxygenase =

Enzyme

Identifiers
- EC no.: 1.13.11.67
- CAS no.: 198028-39-6

Databases
- IntEnz: IntEnz view
- BRENDA: BRENDA entry
- ExPASy: NiceZyme view
- KEGG: KEGG entry
- MetaCyc: metabolic pathway
- PRIAM: profile
- PDB structures: RCSB PDB PDBe PDBsum
Search
- PMC: articles
- PubMed: articles
- NCBI: proteins

8'-apo-beta-carotenoid 14',13'-cleaving dioxygenase (EC 1.13.11.67) is an enzyme with systematic name 8'-apo-beta-carotenol:O2 oxidoreductase (14',13'-cleaving). This enzyme catalyses the following chemical reaction

8'-apo-beta-carotenol + O_{2} $\rightleftharpoons$ 14'-apo-beta-carotenal + an uncharacterized product

8'-apo-beta-carotenoid 14',13'-cleaving dioxygenase is a thiol-dependent enzyme isolated from rat and rabbit.
