= Taxoid 14beta-hydroxylase =

Identifiers
- EC no.: 1.14.13.146

Databases
- IntEnz: IntEnz view
- BRENDA: BRENDA entry
- ExPASy: NiceZyme view
- KEGG: KEGG entry
- MetaCyc: metabolic pathway
- PRIAM: profile
- PDB structures: RCSB PDB PDBe PDBsum
Search
- PMC: articles
- PubMed: articles
- NCBI: proteins

Taxoid 14beta-hydroxylase (EC 1.14.13.146) is an enzyme with systematic name 10beta-hydroxytaxa-4(20),11-dien-5alpha-yl-acetate,NADPH:oxygen 14-oxidoreductase. This enzyme catalyses the following chemical reaction

10beta-hydroxytaxa-4(20),11-dien-5alpha-yl acetate + O_{2} + NADPH + H^{+} $\rightleftharpoons$ 10beta,14beta-dihydroxytaxa-4(20),11-dien-5alpha-yl acetate + NADP^{+} + H_{2}O

Taxoid 14beta-hydroxylase requires cytochrome P450.
