= Acrylyl-CoA reductase (NADPH) =

Class of enzymes

Identifiers
- EC no.: 1.3.1.84

Databases
- IntEnz: IntEnz view
- BRENDA: BRENDA entry
- ExPASy: NiceZyme view
- KEGG: KEGG entry
- MetaCyc: metabolic pathway
- PRIAM: profile
- PDB structures: RCSB PDB PDBe PDBsum
Search
- PMC: articles
- PubMed: articles
- NCBI: proteins

Acrylyl-CoA reductase (NADPH) (EC 1.3.1.84) is an enzyme with systematic name propanoyl-CoA:NADP^{+} oxidoreductase. This enzyme catalyses the following chemical reaction

propanoyl-CoA + NADP^{+} $\rightleftharpoons$ acryloyl-CoA + NADPH + H^{+}

This enzyme catalyses a step in the 3-hydroxypropionate/4-hydroxybutyrate cycle, an autotrophic CO_{2} fixation pathway found in some Thermoacidophilic archaea.
