= Sulfoacetaldehyde dehydrogenase (acylating) =

Identifiers
- EC no.: 1.2.1.81

Databases
- IntEnz: IntEnz view
- BRENDA: BRENDA entry
- ExPASy: NiceZyme view
- KEGG: KEGG entry
- MetaCyc: metabolic pathway
- PRIAM: profile
- PDB structures: RCSB PDB PDBe PDBsum
Search
- PMC: articles
- PubMed: articles
- NCBI: proteins

Sulfoacetaldehyde dehydrogenase (acylating) (EC 1.2.1.81, SauS) is an enzyme with systematic name 2-sulfoacetaldehyde:NADP^{+} oxidoreductase (CoA-acetylating). This enzyme catalyses the following chemical reaction

2-sulfoacetaldehyde + CoA + NADP^{+} $\rightleftharpoons$ sulfoacetyl-CoA + NADPH + H^{+}

The enzyme is involved in degradation of sulfoacetate.
