= FAD reductase (NAD(P)H) =

Bacterial enzyme

Identifiers
- EC no.: 1.5.1.45

Databases
- IntEnz: IntEnz view
- BRENDA: BRENDA entry
- ExPASy: NiceZyme view
- KEGG: KEGG entry
- MetaCyc: metabolic pathway
- PRIAM: profile
- PDB structures: RCSB PDB PDBe PDBsum
Search
- PMC: articles
- PubMed: articles
- NCBI: proteins

FAD reductase (NAD(P)H) (EC 1.5.1.45, GTNG_3158 (gene)) is an enzyme with systematic name FADH_{2}:NAD(P)^{+} oxidoreductase. This enzyme catalyses the following chemical reaction

FADH_{2} + NAD(P)^{+} $\rightleftharpoons$ FAD + NAD(P)H + H^{+}

This enzyme is isolated from the bacterium Geobacillus thermodenitrificans. It takes part in degradation tryptophan.
