= CDP-paratose synthase =

Identifiers
- EC no.: 1.1.1.342

Databases
- IntEnz: IntEnz view
- BRENDA: BRENDA entry
- ExPASy: NiceZyme view
- KEGG: KEGG entry
- MetaCyc: metabolic pathway
- PRIAM: profile
- PDB structures: RCSB PDB PDBe PDBsum
Search
- PMC: articles
- PubMed: articles
- NCBI: proteins

CDP-paratose synthase (EC 1.1.1.342, rfbS (gene)) is an enzyme with systematic name CDP-alpha-D-paratose:NADP^{+} 4-oxidoreductase. This enzyme catalyses the following chemical reaction

CDP-alpha-D-paratose + NADP^{+} $\rightleftharpoons$ CDP-4-dehydro-3,6-dideoxy-alpha-D-glucose + NADPH + H^{+}

This enzyme participates in synthesis of paratose and tyvelose.
