= Plant seed peroxygenase =

Identifiers
- EC no.: 1.11.2.3

Databases
- BRENDA: enzyme data
- ExPASy: NiceZyme view
- KEGG: enzyme entry
- MetaCyc: metabolic pathway
- Rhea: reactions
- PDB structures: RCSB PDB PDBe PDBsum
Search
- PMC: articles
- PubMed: articles
- NCBI: proteins

Plant seed peroxygenase (EC 1.11.2.3, plant peroxygenase, soybean peroxygenase) is an enzyme with systematic name substrate:hydroperoxide oxidoreductase (RH-hydroxylating or epoxidising). This enzyme catalyses the following chemical reaction

R_{1}H + R_{2}OOH $\rightleftharpoons$ R_{1}OH + R_{2}OH

This enzyme is a heme protein that contains calcium binding motif.
