= Nitrite dismutase =

Pis

Identifiers
- EC no.: 1.7.6.1

Databases
- IntEnz: IntEnz view
- BRENDA: BRENDA entry
- ExPASy: NiceZyme view
- KEGG: KEGG entry
- MetaCyc: metabolic pathway
- PRIAM: profile
- PDB structures: RCSB PDB PDBe PDBsum
Search
- PMC: articles
- PubMed: articles
- NCBI: proteins

Nitrite dismutase (EC 1.7.6.1, Prolixin S, Nitrophorin 7) is an enzyme with systematic name nitrite:nitrite oxidoreductase. This enzyme catalyses the following chemical reaction

3 nitrite + 2 H^{+} $\rightleftharpoons$ 2 nitric oxide + nitrate + H_{2}O

Nitrite dismutase contains ferriheme b.
