= P450-containing systems =

Any enzyme system that includes cytochrome P450 protein or domain can be called a P450-containing system.

P450 enzymes usually function as a terminal oxidase in multicomponent electron-transfer chains, called P450-containing monooxygenase systems, although self-sufficient, non-monooxygenase P450s have been also described. All known P450-containing monooxygenase systems share common structural and functional domain architecture. Apart from the cytochrome itself, these systems contain one or more fundamental redox domains: FAD-containing flavoprotein or domain, FMN domain, ferredoxin and cytochrome b_{5}. These ubiquitous redox domains, in various combinations, are widely distributed in biological systems. FMN domain, ferredoxin or cytochrome b_{5} transfer electrons between the flavin reductase (protein or domain) and P450. While P450-containing systems are found throughout all kingdoms of life, some organisms lack one or more of these redox domains.

== Fd/P450 systems ==
These systems involve P450 accepting electrons from the reduced form of soluble ferredoxins (Fd).

=== FR/Fd/P450 systems ===
Mitochondrial and some bacterial P450 systems employ soluble Fe_{2}S_{2} ferredoxins (Fd) that act as single electron carriers between FAD-containing ferredoxin reductase (FR) and P450. In mitochondrial monooxygenase systems, adrenodoxin functions as a soluble electron carrier between NADPH:adrenodoxin reductase and several membrane-bound P450s (CYP11A, CYP11B, CYP27). In bacteria, putidaredoxin, terpredoxin, and rhodocoxin serve as electron carriers between corresponding NADH-dependent ferredoxin reductases and soluble P450s (CYP101, CYP108, CYP116).

NADH	→	putidaredoxin reductase	→	putidaredoxin	→	CYP101	→	O_{2}
NADH	→	terpredoxin reductase	→	terpredoxin	→	CYP108	→	O_{2}
NADH	→	rhodocoxin reductase	→	rhodocoxin	→	CYP116	→	O_{2}
NADPH	→	adrenodoxin reductase	→	adrenodoxin	→	CYP11A1	→	O_{2}

The general scheme of electron flow in the P450 systems containing adrenodoxin-type ferredoxins is:

NAD(P)H	→	FAD	→	Fe_{2}S_{2}	→	P450	→	O_{2}

The sterol demethylase system from Mycobacterium tuberculosis contains flavoprotein reductase A (FprA), bacterial-type Fe_{3}S_{4} ferredoxin and CYP51 hemoprotein.

NAD(P)H	→	FAD	→	Fe_{3}S_{4}	→	P450	→	O_{2}

=== FMN/Fd/P450 systems ===
An unusual one-component P450 system was originally found in Rhodococcus sp. NCIMB 9784 (CYP116B2). In this system, the N-terminal P450 domain is fused to the reductase domain that shows sequence similarity to phthalate dioxygenase reductase and consists, in its turn, of FMN-binding domain and C-terminal plant-type ferredoxin domain. Similar systems have been identified in the heavy-metal-tolerant bacterium Ralstonia metallidurans (CYP116A1) and in several species of Burkolderia. The general scheme of electron flow in this system appears to be:

NADH	→	FMN	→	Fe_{2}S_{2}	→	P450	→	O_{2}

== CPR/P450 systems ==
Eukaryotic microsomal P450 enzymes and some bacterial P450s receive electrons from a FAD- and FMN-containing enzyme known as cytochrome P450 reductase (CPR; EC 1.6.2.4). Microsomal CPR is membrane-bound protein that interacts with different P450s. In Bacillus megaterium and Bacillus subtilis, CPR is a C-terminal domain of CYP102, a single polypeptide self-sufficient soluble P450 system (P450 is an N-terminal domain). The general scheme of electron flow in the CPR/P450 system is:

NADPH	→	FAD	→	FMN	→	P450	→	O_{2}

== CBR/b5/P450 systems ==
The ubiquitous electron-transport protein cytochrome b_{5} can serve as an effector (activator or inhibitor) of P450s. It was hypothesized that cytochrome b_{5} is involved in the transfer of the second electron to P450, either from CPR or from NADH:cytochrome b_{5} reductase (CBR; EC 1.6.2.2):

NADPH	→	CPR	→	cyt b_{5}	→	P450	→	O_{2}
NADH	→	CBR	→	cyt b_{5}	→	P450	→	O_{2}

The ability of the CBR/cytochrome b_{5} system to support P450 catalysis has been demonstrated in vitro using purified CBR and cytochrome b_{5} from Saccharomyces cerevisiae and CYP51 enzyme from Candida albicans. In this system, both the first and second electrons are donated by CBR.

NAD(P)H	→	FAD	→	b_{5}	→	P450	→	O_{2}

== P450-only systems ==
Nitric oxide reductase (P450nor) is a P450 enzyme involved in denitrification in several fungal species. The best-characterized P450nor is CYP55A1 from Fusarium oxysporum. This enzyme does not have monooxygenase activity but is able to reduce nitric oxide (NO^{·}) to form nitrous oxide (N_{2}O) directly using NAD(P)H as electron donor:

NAD(P)H	→	P450	→	NO^{·}

Fatty acid β-hydroxylase P450_{BSβ} from Bacillus subtilis (CYP152A1) and fatty acid α-hydroxylase P450_{SPα} from Pseudomonas paucimobilis (CYP152B1) catalyse the hydroxylation reaction of long-chain fatty acids using hydrogen peroxide (H_{2}O_{2}) as an oxidant. These enzymes do not require any reduction system for catalysis.

Allene oxide synthase (CYP74A; EC 4.2.1.92), fatty acid hydroperoxide lyase (CYP74B), prostacyclin synthase (CYP8; EC 5.3.99.4) and thromboxane synthase (CYP5; EC 5.3.99.5) are examples of P450 enzymes that do not require a reductase or molecular oxygen for their catalytic activity. Substrates for all these enzymes are fatty acid derivatives containing partially reduced dioxygen (either hydroperoxy or epidioxy groups).
