= Phycoerythrobilin synthase =

Identifiers
- EC no.: 1.3.7.6

Databases
- IntEnz: IntEnz view
- BRENDA: BRENDA entry
- ExPASy: NiceZyme view
- KEGG: KEGG entry
- MetaCyc: metabolic pathway
- PRIAM: profile
- PDB structures: RCSB PDB PDBe PDBsum
Search
- PMC: articles
- PubMed: articles
- NCBI: proteins

Phycoerythrobilin synthase (EC 1.3.7.6, PebS) is an enzyme with systematic name (3Z)-phycoerythrobilin:ferredoxin oxidoreductase (from biliverdin IX alpha). It catalyses the following chemical reaction

biliverdin
+ 2 reduced
ferredoxin
(3Z)-phycoerythrobilin
+ 2 oxidised
ferredoxin

This enzyme, from a cyanophage infecting oceanic cyanobacteria of the Prochlorococcus genus carries out in one step the reduction of biliverdin to (3Z)-phycoerythrobilin. The same overall reaction results from the action of 15,16-dihydrobiliverdin:ferredoxin oxidoreductase and phycoerythrobilin:ferredoxin oxidoreductase in oxygenic organisms.
