= Adrenodoxin-NADP+ reductase =

Enzyme

Adrenodoxin-NADP^{+} reductase

Identifiers
- EC no.: 1.18.1.6

Databases
- IntEnz: IntEnz view
- BRENDA: BRENDA entry
- ExPASy: NiceZyme view
- KEGG: KEGG entry
- MetaCyc: metabolic pathway
- PRIAM: profile
- PDB structures: RCSB PDB PDBe PDBsum
Search
- PMC: articles
- PubMed: articles
- NCBI: proteins

Adrenodoxin-NADP^{+} reductase (EC 1.18.1.6, adrenodoxin reductase, nicotinamide adenine dinucleotide phosphate-adrenodoxin reductase, ADR, NADPH:adrenal ferredoxin oxidoreductase) is an enzyme with systematic name adrendoxin:NADP^{+} oxidoreductase. This enzyme catalyses the following chemical reaction

2 reduced adrenodoxin + NADP^{+} $\rightleftharpoons$ 2 oxidized adrenodoxin + NADPH + H^{+}

Adrenodoxin-NADP+ reductase is a flavoprotein (FAD).
