= CYP12 family =

Group of cytochrome P450 enzymes

Cytochrome P450, family 12, also known as CYP12, is a cytochrome P450 family found in insect genome belongs to Mitochondrial clan CYPs, which is located in the inner membrane of mitochondria (IMM). The first gene identified in this family is the CYP12A1 from the Musca domestica (house fly), which is involved in insecticide resistance. CYP12A1 protein localization in mitochondria by immunohistochemistry and absolute dependence on mitochondrial electron donors adrenodoxin reductase and adrenodoxin.

Rabbit gene CYP8B1 was named CYP12 at the beginning of its discovery, because it hydroxylated its sterol substrate on the 12 position. However, CYP12 is a family of insect P450s found in mitochondria, so this gene was renamed to CYP8B1.
