= Indole 2,3-dioxygenase =

Identifiers
- EC no.: 1.13.11.17
- CAS no.: 37256-57-8

Databases
- BRENDA: enzyme data
- ExPASy: NiceZyme view
- KEGG: enzyme entry
- MetaCyc: metabolic pathway
- Rhea: reactions
- PDB structures: RCSB PDB PDBe PDBsum
- Gene Ontology: AmiGO / QuickGO
Search
- PMC: articles
- PubMed: articles
- NCBI: proteins

Indole 2,3-dioxygenase (EC 1.13.11.17) is an enzyme that catalyzes the chemical reaction

indole
O_{2}
2-formylphenylformamide

The two substrates of this enzyme are indole and oxygen. Its product is 2-formylphenylformamide.

This enzyme belongs to the family of oxidoreductases, specifically those acting on single donors with O_{2} as oxidant and incorporation of two atoms of oxygen into the substrate (oxygenases). The oxygen incorporated need not be derived from O_{2}. The systematic name of this enzyme class is indole:oxygen 2,3-oxidoreductase (decyclizing). Other names in common use include indole oxidase, indoleamine 2,3-dioxygenase (ambiguous), indole:O2 oxidoreductase, indole-oxygen 2,3-oxidoreductase (decyclizing), and IDO (ambiguous). This enzyme participates in tryptophan metabolism. It has 3 cofactors: copper, Flavin, and Flavoprotein.

Indole dioxygenase is not specific to indole but rather operates on a broad range of indole derivatives, including the amino acids tryptophan and 5-hydroxytryptophan (5-HTP), and many indole-analog plant phytochemicals. IDO is a peripheral enzyme, in contrast to tryptophan oxidase, an enzyme of similar amino acid sequence, which is active only in the liver. IDO is induced (produced on demand) by activation of inflammatory processes involving cytokine expression by white blood cells.
