= Carbon-monoxide dehydrogenase (ferredoxin) =

Enzyme

carbon-monoxide dehydrogenase (ferredoxin)

Identifiers
- EC no.: 1.2.7.4

Databases
- IntEnz: IntEnz view
- BRENDA: BRENDA entry
- ExPASy: NiceZyme view
- KEGG: KEGG entry
- MetaCyc: metabolic pathway
- PRIAM: profile
- PDB structures: RCSB PDB PDBe PDBsum
- Gene Ontology: AmiGO / QuickGO
Search
- PMC: articles
- PubMed: articles
- NCBI: proteins

In enzymology, carbon-monoxide dehydrogenase (ferredoxin) (EC 1.2.7.4) is an enzyme that catalyzes the chemical reaction

CO + H_{2}O + oxidized ferredoxin $\rightleftharpoons$ CO_{2} + reduced ferredoxin

The three substrates of this enzyme are carbon monoxide, water, and oxidized ferredoxin. Its products are carbon dioxide and reduced ferredoxin.

This enzyme belongs to the family of oxidoreductases, specifically those acting on the aldehyde or oxo group of donor with an iron-sulfur protein as acceptor. The systematic name of this enzyme class is carbon-monoxide,water:ferredoxin oxidoreductase.
