= Cholestanetriol 26-monooxygenase =

Class of enzymes

Identifiers
- EC no.: 1.14.15.15
- CAS no.: 52227-77-7

Databases
- IntEnz: IntEnz view
- BRENDA: BRENDA entry
- ExPASy: NiceZyme view
- KEGG: KEGG entry
- MetaCyc: metabolic pathway
- PRIAM: profile
- PDB structures: RCSB PDB PDBe PDBsum
- Gene Ontology: AmiGO / QuickGO
Search
- PMC: articles
- PubMed: articles
- NCBI: proteins

Cholestanetriol 26-monooxygenase (EC 1.14.15.15) is an enzyme that catalyzes the overall chemical reaction:

trihydroxycoprostane
+ reduced
ferredoxin
3 O_{2}
4 H_{2}O
trihydroxycoprostanic acid
+ oxidised
ferredoxin

The enzyme is an oxidoreductase that uses molecular oxygen in a multi-step oxidation reaction which specifically converts one terminal methyl group of the steroid to its corresponding bile acid. It requires adrenal ferredoxin to transfer electrons from nicotinamide adenine dinucleotide phosphate to the cytochrome P450 active site. The systematic name of this enzyme class is 5beta-cholestane-3alpha,7alpha,12alpha-triol,NADPH:oxygen oxidoreductase (26-hydroxylating). Other names in common use include 5beta-cholestane-3alpha,7alpha,12alpha-triol 26-hydroxylase, 5beta-cholestane-3alpha,7alpha,12alpha-triol hydroxylase, cholestanetriol 26-hydroxylase, sterol 27-hydroxylase, sterol 26-hydroxylase, cholesterol 27-hydroxylase, CYP27A, CYP27A1, and cytochrome P450 27A1'.
