= NUBP2 =

Protein-coding gene in the species Homo sapiens

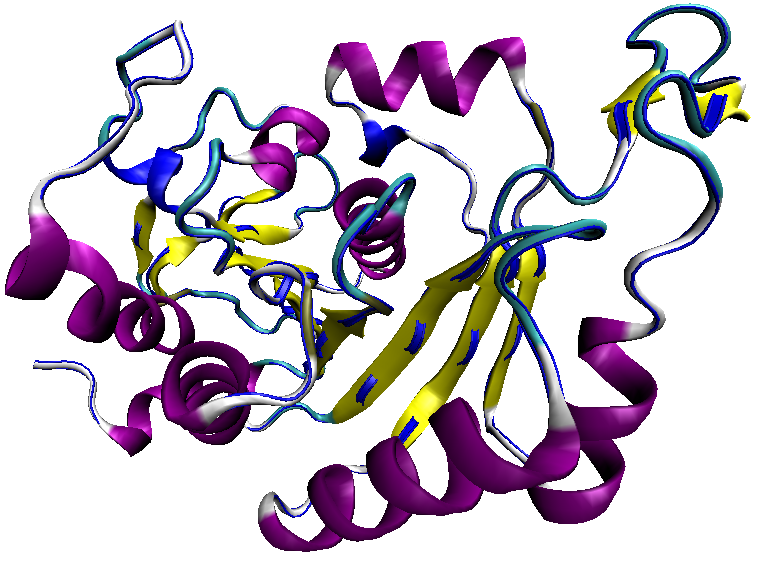

Identifiers
- Aliases: NUBP2, CFD1, NBP 2, NUBP1, nucleotide binding protein 2, CIAO6, NUBP iron-sulfur cluster assembly factor 2, cytosolic
- External IDs: OMIM: 610779; MGI: 1347072; GeneCards: NUBP2

Gene location (Human)
Chr.	Chromosome 16 (human)
Band	16p13.3	Start	1,782,932 bp
Band	16p13.3	End	1,789,186 bp

Gene location (Mouse)
Chr.	Chromosome 17 (mouse)
Band	17 A3.3|17 12.53 cM	Start	24,882,611 bp
Band	17 A3.3|17 12.53 cM	End	24,886,349 bp
RNA expression pattern
Bgee	Human / Mouse (ortholog); Top expressed in: thymus; right lobe of liver; right hemisphere of cerebellum; apex of heart; muscle of thigh; fundus; body of pancreas; right adrenal gland; gastrocnemius muscle; left adrenal cortex / Top expressed in: spermatocyte; seminiferous tubule; spermatid; right kidney; morula; fetal liver hematopoietic progenitor cell; yolk sac; blastocyst; embryo; proximal tubule; More reference expression data
BioGPS	n/a
Gene ontology
Molecular function	4 iron, 4 sulfur cluster binding; iron-sulfur cluster binding; protein binding; ATP binding; metal ion binding; nucleotide binding
Cellular component	cytoplasm; centriole; cell projection; spindle pole centrosome; cilium; cytoskeleton; nucleus; microtubule organizing center; cytosol
Biological process	cell projection organization; iron-sulfur cluster assembly
Sources:Amigo / QuickGO
Orthologs
Databases	NCBI: entry; OMA: entry
Species	Human	Mouse
Entrez	10101	26426
Ensembl	ENSG00000095906	ENSMUSG00000039183
UniProt	Q9Y5Y2	Q9R061
RefSeq (mRNA)	NM_001284501; NM_001284502; NM_012225	NM_011956; NM_001355396
RefSeq (protein)	NP_001271430; NP_001271431; NP_036357	NP_036086; NP_001342325
Location (UCSC)	Chr 16: 1.78 – 1.79 Mb	Chr 17: 24.88 – 24.89 Mb
PubMed search
- Wikidata
View/Edit Human	View/Edit Mouse

ParA/MinD ATPase like

Identifiers
- Symbol: ParA
- Pfam: PF10609
- InterPro: IPR019591
Available protein structures:
- PDB: IPR019591 PF10609 (ECOD; PDBsum)
- AlphaFold: IPR019591; PF10609

Nucleotide-binding protein 2 (NBP 2) also known as cytosolic Fe-S cluster assembly factor NUBP2 is a protein that in humans is encoded by the NUBP2 gene.

NUBP2 is a member of the NUBP/MRP gene subfamily of ATP-binding proteins. There are two types in eukaryotes NUBP1 and NUBP2, and one novel human gene that define NBP nucleotide-binding proteins (NUBP/MRP-multidrug resistance-associated protein) in mammalian cells requires the maturation of cytosolic iron-sulfur (Fe/S) proteins as Nubp1 is involved in the formation of extramitochondrial Fe/S proteins the cell division inhibitor MinD is homologous and involve two proteins components of the (FeS) protein assembly machinery closely similar cytosolic soluble P loop NTPase where Nar1 is required for assembly, identified Cfd1p in cytosolic and nuclear Fe/S protein biogenesis in yeast. Nubp proteins NTPase Nbp35p. MinD is homologous to members in MinD of E. coli, a relative of the ParA family.

== Morphology ==
^{Further information: Morphology (biology)}

NBP35 bacterial plasmids F (the classical Escherichia coli sex factor) is found in all nuclear genes in vegetative and gametic flagella of the unicellular green algae C. reinhardtii and nuclear Fe/S protein biogenesis required for cytosolic iron-sulfur protein assembly; MNP =MRP-like; MRP (Multiple Resistance and pH adaptation) MRP/NBP35-like P-loop NTPase similar to; and functions as minD_arch; cell division ATPase MinD, archaeal and homologue's of NUBP1. The NBP35 gene is conserved in archaea Bacteria, Metazoa, Fungi and other Eukaryotes and with considerable divergence from the yeast; Cfd1-Nbp35 Fe-S to man. In a scaffold complex protein to form large molecular assemblies that store Fe(III) and 4Fe-4S seen as secondary to defects inactivated to accomplish its functions as physiologically relevant form(s) Fe/S proteins Iron regulatory protein 1 (IRP1) is regulated through prevents deficiencies and increased mutation rates that characterized a plant P loop NTPase with sequence similarity to Nbp35 homologue's of NUBP1.

== Interactions ==
NUBP2 has been shown to interact with...

- ACO1 Iron-responsive element-binding protein 1 (IRE-BP 1) (Iron regulatory protein 1) (IRP1)
- MAPK8IP3 C-jun-amino-terminal kinase-interacting protein 3 (JNK-interacting protein 3) (JIP-3)
- IGFALS Insulin-like growth factor-binding protein complex acid labile chain precursor (ALS)
- KIF11 Kinesin-like protein KIF11 (Kinesin-related motor protein Eg5)
- SEPP1 Selenoprotein P precursor (SeP)
- CA1 Carbonic anhydrase 1 (EC 4.2.1.1) (Carbonic anhydrase I) (Carbonate dehydratase I) (CA-I)
