= Tungsten =

Tungsten, _{74}W
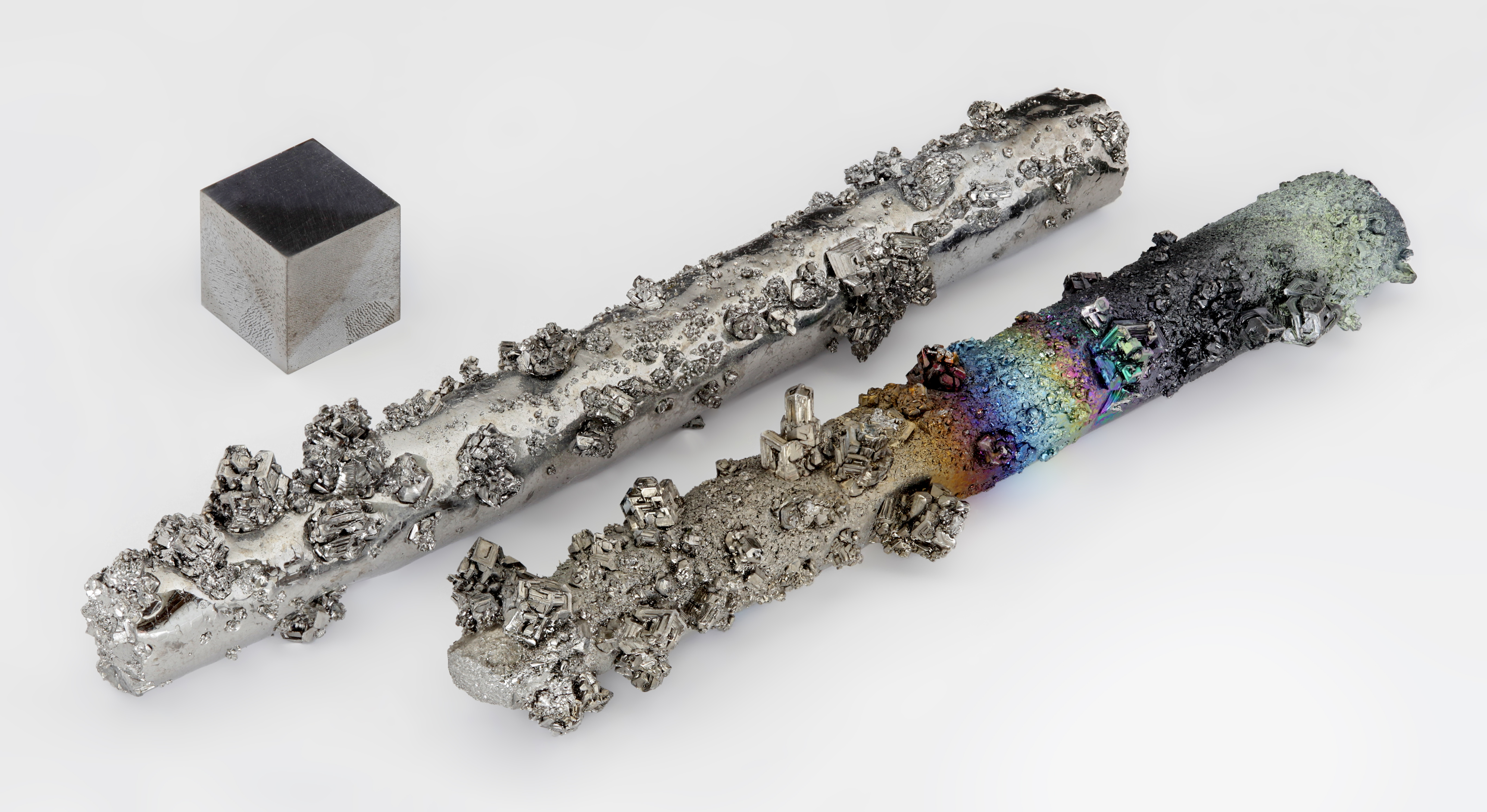

Tungsten
- Pronunciation: /ˈtʌŋstən/ (TUNG-stən)
- Alternative name: Wolfram, pronounced: /ˈwʊlfrəm/ (WUUL-frəm)
- Allotropes: α-tungsten (common), β-tungsten
- Appearance: Grayish white, lustrous

Standard atomic weight A_{r}°(W)
- 183.84±0.01; 183.84±0.01 (abridged)

Tungsten in the periodic table
Hydrogen																															Helium
Lithium	Beryllium																									Boron	Carbon	Nitrogen	Oxygen	Fluorine	Neon
Sodium	Magnesium																									Aluminium	Silicon	Phosphorus	Sulfur	Chlorine	Argon
Potassium	Calcium															Scandium	Titanium	Vanadium	Chromium	Manganese	Iron	Cobalt	Nickel	Copper	Zinc	Gallium	Germanium	Arsenic	Selenium	Bromine	Krypton
Rubidium	Strontium															Yttrium	Zirconium	Niobium	Molybdenum	Technetium	Ruthenium	Rhodium	Palladium	Silver	Cadmium	Indium	Tin	Antimony	Tellurium	Iodine	Xenon
Caesium	Barium	Lanthanum	Cerium	Praseodymium	Neodymium	Promethium	Samarium	Europium	Gadolinium	Terbium	Dysprosium	Holmium	Erbium	Thulium	Ytterbium	Lutetium	Hafnium	Tantalum	Tungsten	Rhenium	Osmium	Iridium	Platinum	Gold	Mercury (element)	Thallium	Lead	Bismuth	Polonium	Astatine	Radon
Francium	Radium	Actinium	Thorium	Protactinium	Uranium	Neptunium	Plutonium	Americium	Curium	Berkelium	Californium	Einsteinium	Fermium	Mendelevium	Nobelium	Lawrencium	Rutherfordium	Dubnium	Seaborgium	Bohrium	Hassium	Meitnerium	Darmstadtium	Roentgenium	Copernicium	Nihonium	Flerovium	Moscovium	Livermorium	Tennessine	Oganesson
Mo
↑
W
↓
Sg
tantalum ← tungsten → rhenium
- Atomic number (Z): 74
- Group: group 6
- Period: period 6
- Block: d-block
- Electron configuration: [Xe] 4f^{14} 5d^{4} 6s^{2}
- Electrons per shell: 2, 8, 18, 32, 12, 2

Physical properties
- Phase at STP: solid
- Melting point: 3695 K (3422 °C, 6192 °F)
- Boiling point: 6203 K (5930 °C, 10706 °F)
- Density (at 20° C): 19.254 g/cm^{3}
- when liquid (at m.p.): 17.6 g/cm^{3}
- Heat of fusion: 52.31 kJ/mol
- Heat of vaporization: 774 kJ/mol
- Molar heat capacity: 24.27 J/(mol·K)
- Specific heat capacity: 132.017 J/(kg·K)
Vapor pressure
P (Pa)	1	10	100	1 k	10 k	100 k
at T (K)	3477	3773	4137	4579	5127	5823

Atomic properties
- Oxidation states: common: +4, +6 −4, −2, −1, 0, +1, +2, +3, +5
- Electronegativity: Pauling scale: 2.36
- Ionization energies: 1st: 770 kJ/mol; 2nd: 1700 kJ/mol
- Atomic radius: empirical: 139 pm
- Covalent radius: 162±7 pm
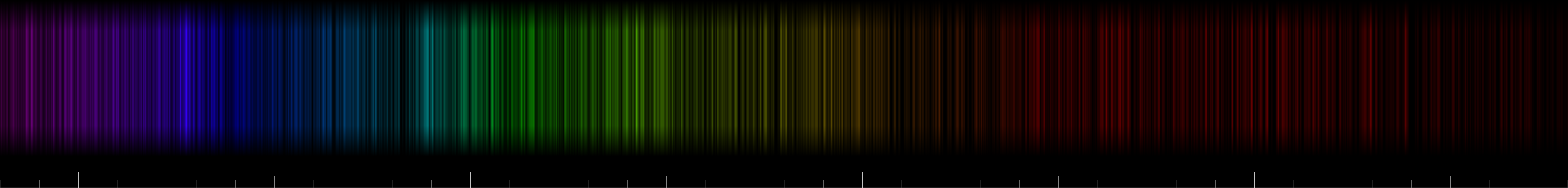
- Spectral lines of tungsten

Other properties
- Natural occurrence: primordial
- Crystal structure: body-centered cubic (bcc) (cI2)
- Lattice constant: a = 316.52 pm (at 20 °C)
- Thermal expansion: 4.42×10^{−6}/K (at 20 °C)
- Thermal conductivity: 173 W/(m⋅K)
- Electrical resistivity: 52.8 nΩ⋅m (at 20 °C)
- Magnetic ordering: paramagnetic
- Molar magnetic susceptibility: +59.0×10^{−6} cm^{3}/mol (298 K)
- Young's modulus: 411 GPa
- Shear modulus: 161 GPa
- Bulk modulus: 310 GPa
- Speed of sound thin rod: 4620 m/s (at r.t.) (annealed)
- Poisson ratio: 0.28
- Mohs hardness: 7.5
- Vickers hardness: 3430–4600 MPa
- Brinell hardness: 2000–4000 MPa
- CAS Number: 7440-33-7

History
- Naming: the old Swedish name for the mineral scheelite, from which it was isolated; means 'heavy stone'
- Discovery and first isolation: Juan José Elhuyar and Fausto Elhuyar (1783)
- Named by: Torbern Bergman (1781)
- Symbol: "W": from Wolfram, originally from Middle High German wolf-rahm 'wolf's foam' describing the mineral wolframite

Isotopes of tungsten
Main isotopes			Decay	
Isotope	abundance	half-life (t_{1/2})	mode	product
^{180}W	0.12%	1.59×10^{18} y	α	^{176}Hf
^{181}W	synth	120.96 d	ε	^{181}Ta
^{182}W	26.50%	stable		
^{183}W	14.31%	stable		
^{184}W	30.64%	stable		
^{185}W	synth	75.1 d	β^{−}	^{185}Re
^{186}W	28.43%	stable		
^{187}W	synth	23.81 h	β^{−}	^{187}Re
^{188}W	synth	69.77 d	β^{−}	^{188}Re

Tungsten is a chemical element; it has symbol W (from German: Wolfram) and atomic number 74. It is a metal found naturally on Earth almost exclusively in compounds with other elements. It was identified as a distinct element in 1781 and first isolated as a metal in 1783. Its important ores include scheelite and wolframite, the latter lending the element its alternative name.

The free element is remarkable for its robustness, especially the fact that it has the highest melting point of all known elements, at 3,422 °C (6,192 °F; 3,695 K) at standard pressure. It also has the highest boiling point, at 5,930 °C (10,706 °F; 6,203 K). Its density is 19.254 g/cm^{3}, comparable with that of uranium and gold, and much higher (about 1.7 times) than that of lead. Polycrystalline tungsten is an intrinsically brittle and hard material (under standard conditions, when uncombined), making it difficult to work into metal. However, pure single-crystalline tungsten is more ductile and can be cut with a hard-steel hacksaw.

Tungsten occurs in many alloys, which have numerous applications, including incandescent light bulb filaments, X-ray tubes, electrodes in gas tungsten arc welding, superalloys, and radiation shielding. Tungsten's hardness and high density make it suitable for military applications in penetrating projectiles. Tungsten compounds are often used as industrial catalysts. Its largest use is in tungsten carbide, a wear-resistant material used in metalworking, mining, and construction. About 50% of tungsten is used in tungsten carbide, with the remaining major use being alloys and steels: less than 10% is used in other compounds.

Tungsten is the only metal in the third transition series that is known to occur in biomolecules, found in a few species of bacteria and archaea. However, tungsten interferes with molybdenum and copper metabolism and is somewhat toxic to most forms of animal life.

== Characteristics ==
=== Physical properties ===
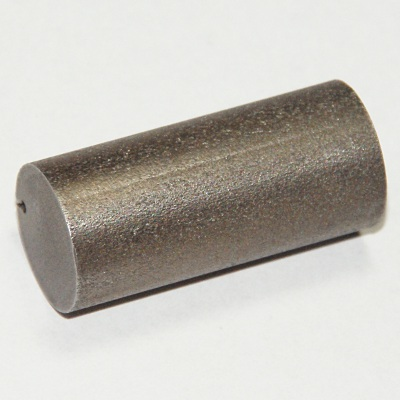
Tungsten rod with oxidised surface

In its raw form, tungsten is a hard steel-grey metal that is often brittle and hard to work. Purified, monocrystalline tungsten retains its hardness (which exceeds that of many steels), and becomes malleable enough that it can be worked easily. It can be worked by forging, drawing, rolling, or extruding. Most materials based on tungsten are formed by sintering tungsten powder along with additives, though this results in a more porous final product.

Of all metals in pure form, tungsten has the highest melting point (3,422 °C, 6,192 °F), lowest vapor pressure (at temperatures above 1,650 °C, 3,000 °F), and the highest tensile strength. Although carbon remains solid at higher temperatures than tungsten, carbon sublimes at atmospheric pressure instead of melting, so it has no melting point. Moreover, tungsten's most stable crystal phase does not exhibit any high-pressure-induced structural transformations for pressures up to at least 364 gigapascals. Tungsten has the lowest coefficient of thermal expansion of any pure metal. The low thermal expansion and high melting point and tensile strength of tungsten originate from strong covalent bonds formed between tungsten atoms by the 5d electrons. Alloying small quantities of tungsten with steel greatly increases its toughness.

Tungsten exists in two major crystalline forms: α and β. The former has a body-centered cubic structure and is the more stable form. The structure of the β phase is called A15 cubic; it is metastable, but can coexist with the α phase at ambient conditions owing to non-equilibrium synthesis or stabilization by impurities. Contrary to the α phase which crystallizes in isometric grains, the β form exhibits a columnar habit. The α phase has one third of the electrical resistivity and a much lower superconducting transition temperature T_{c} relative to the β phase: ca. 0.015 K vs. 1–4 K; mixing the two phases allows obtaining intermediate T_{c} values. The T_{c} value can also be raised by alloying tungsten with another metal (e.g. 7.9 K for W-Tc). Such tungsten alloys are sometimes used in low-temperature superconducting circuits.

=== Isotopes ===
Naturally occurring tungsten consists of four stable isotopes (^{182}W, ^{183}W, ^{184}W, and ^{186}W) and one very long-lived radioisotope, ^{180}W. Theoretically, all five can decay into isotopes of element 72 (hafnium) by alpha emission, but only ^{180}W has been observed to do so, with a half-life of (1.8±0.2)×10^{18} years; on average, this yields about two alpha decays of ^{180}W per gram of natural tungsten per year.

Another 34 artificial radioisotopes of tungsten have been characterized, the most stable of which are ^{181}W with a half-life of 121.2 days, ^{185}W with a half-life of 75.1 days, ^{188}W with a half-life of 69.4 days, ^{178}W with a half-life of 21.6 days, and ^{187}W with a half-life of 23.72 h. All of the remaining radioactive isotopes have half-lives of less than 3 hours, and most of these have half-lives below 8 minutes. Tungsten also has 12 meta states, with the most stable being ^{179m}W (t_{½} 6.4 minutes).

=== Chemical properties ===
Tungsten is a mostly non-reactive element: it does not react with water, is immune to attack by most acids and bases, and does not react with oxygen or air at room temperature. At elevated temperatures (i.e., when red-hot) it reacts with oxygen to form the trioxide compound tungsten(VI), WO_{3}. It will, however, react directly with fluorine (F_{2}) at room temperature to form tungsten(VI) fluoride (WF_{6}), a colorless gas. At around 250 °C it will react with chlorine or bromine, and under certain hot conditions will react with iodine. Finely divided tungsten is pyrophoric.

The most common formal oxidation state of tungsten is +6, but it exhibits all oxidation states from −2 to +6. Tungsten typically combines with oxygen to form the yellow tungstic oxide, WO_{3}, which dissolves in aqueous alkaline solutions to form tungstate ions, WO_{4}^{2−}.

Tungsten carbides (W_{2}C and WC) are produced by heating powdered tungsten with carbon. W_{2}C is resistant to chemical attack, although it reacts strongly with chlorine to form tungsten hexachloride (WCl_{6}).

In aqueous solution, tungstate gives the heteropoly acids and polyoxometalate anions under neutral and acidic conditions. As tungstate is progressively treated with acid, it first yields the soluble, metastable "paratungstate A" anion, W_{7}O_{24}^{6−}, which over time converts to the less soluble "paratungstate B" anion, H_{2}W_{12}O_{42}^{10−}. Further acidification produces the very soluble metatungstate anion, H_{2}W_{12}O_{4}^{6−}, after which equilibrium is reached. The metatungstate ion exists as a symmetric cluster of twelve tungsten-oxygen octahedra known as the Keggin anion. Many other polyoxometalate anions exist as metastable species. The inclusion of a different atom such as phosphorus in place of the two central hydrogens in metatungstate produces a wide variety of heteropoly acids, such as phosphotungstic acid H_{3}PW_{12}O_{40}.

Tungsten trioxide can form intercalation compounds with alkali metals. These are known as bronzes, and have the general formula of M_{x}WO_{3-x}, where M is an alkali metal; an example is sodium tungsten bronze. Tungsten trioxide is also intercalated with hydrogen ions in electrochromic devices, that is, devices that store a charge and change color.

In gaseous form, tungsten forms the diatomic species W_{2}. These molecules feature a sextuple bond between tungsten atoms — the highest known bond order among stable atoms.

== History ==
In 1781, Carl Wilhelm Scheele discovered that a new acid, tungstic acid, could be made from scheelite (at the time called tungsten). Scheele and Torbern Bergman suggested that it might be possible to obtain a new metal by reducing this acid. In 1783, José and Fausto Elhuyar found an acid made from wolframite that was identical to tungstic acid. Later that year, at the Royal Basque Society in the town of Bergara, Spain, the brothers succeeded in isolating tungsten by reduction of this acid with charcoal, and they are credited with the discovery of the element (they called it "wolfram" or "volfram").

The strategic value of tungsten came to notice in the early 20th century. British authorities acted in 1912 to free the Carrock mine from the German owned Cumbrian Mining Company and, during World War I, restrict German access elsewhere. In World War II, tungsten played a more significant role in background political dealings. Portugal, as the main European source of the element, was put under pressure from both sides because of its deposits of wolframite ore at Panasqueira. Tungsten's desirable properties such as resistance to high temperatures, its hardness and density, and its strengthening of alloys made it an important raw material for the arms industry, both as a constituent of weapons and equipment and employed in production itself, e.g., in tungsten carbide cutting tools for machining steel. Elemental tungsten is mostly used in the 21st century to make the alloy tungsten steel, but it also finds uses in the filaments of incandescent lamps as well as turbine blades.

Tungsten is unique amongst the elements in that it has been the subject of patent proceedings. In 1928, a US court rejected General Electric's attempt to patent it, overturning U.S. patent 1,082,933 granted in 1913 to William D. Coolidge.

It is suggested that remnants of wolfram have been found in what may have been the garden of the astronomer and alchemist Tycho Brahe.

=== Etymology ===
The name tungsten (which means 'heavy stone' in Swedish and was the old Swedish name for the mineral scheelite and other minerals of similar density) is used in English, French, and many other languages as the name of the element, but wolfram (or volfram) is used in most European (especially Germanic and Slavic) languages and is derived from the mineral wolframite, which is the origin of the chemical symbol W. The name wolframite is derived from German wolf rahm ('wolf soot, wolf cream'), the name given to tungsten by Johan Gottschalk Wallerius in 1747. This, in turn, derives from Latin lupi spuma, the name Georg Agricola used for the mineral in 1546, which translates into English as 'wolf's froth' and is a reference to the large amounts of tin consumed by the mineral during its extraction, as though the mineral devoured it like a wolf.

The name wolfram was accepted by the International Union of Pure and Applied Chemistry in 1949; this decision was disputed by English-speaking scientists, and the next year it was revised to reflect the widespread use of the name tungsten in that region, though the symbol W was kept. In Germany and several other European countries, the name wolfram is still preferred, while tungsten remains more common in Britain and the United States.

== Occurrence ==
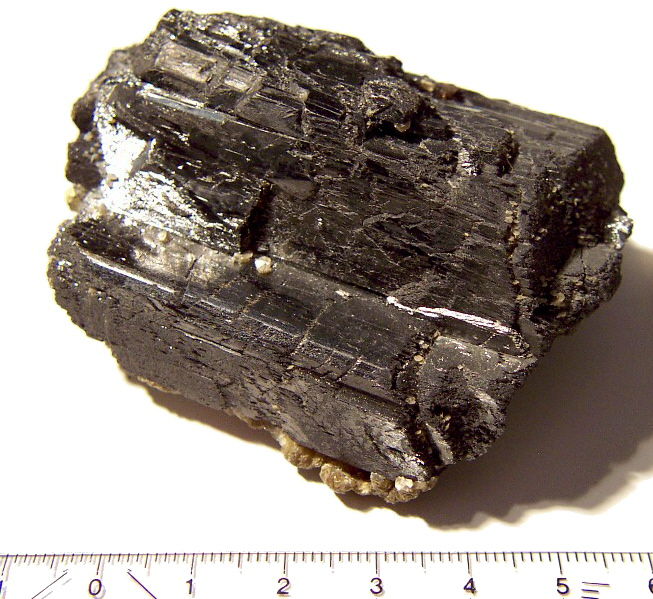
Wolframite mineral, with a scale in cm

Tungsten is found mainly in the minerals wolframite, scheelite, tuneptite (tungstite) and stolzite. Wolframite is iron–manganese tungstate (Fe,Mn)WO_{4}, a solid solution of the two minerals ferberite (FeWO_{4}) and hübnerite (MnWO_{4}), while scheelite is calcium tungstate (CaWO_{4}). Tungstite is produced through weathering of other tungsten minerals. Stolzite is nominally tetragonal lead tungstate (PbWO_{4}), but often forms clusters with molybdenum. Tungsten ore deposits are predominantly magmatic or hydrothermal in origin and are associated with felsic igneous intrusions. Pure tungsten has thus far not been found in nature.

Even though minerals such as wolframite and scheelite are considered tungsten's main ores, their composition is rarely more than 1.5% tungsten oxide. Tungsten is separated from scheelite ore by froth flotation or gravity separation, since the crystals have a tendency to break apart into fine particles; wolfram is weakly magnetic, and so can be separated by a combination of gravity and magnetic separation methods.

== Chemical compounds ==
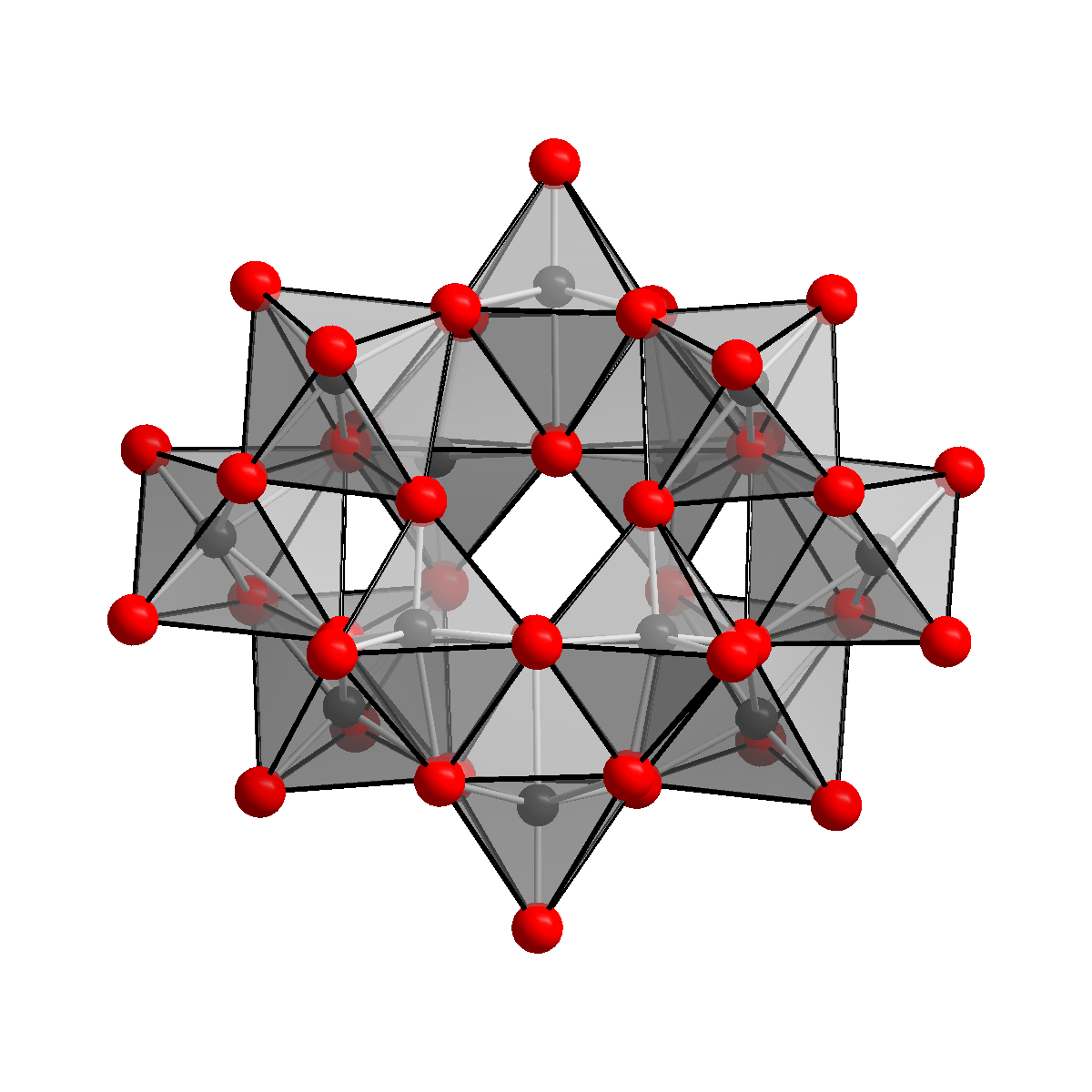
Structure of paratungstate [W_{12}O_{42}]^{12−}. Ammonium paratungstate has been described as "the most important raw material for all other tungsten products."

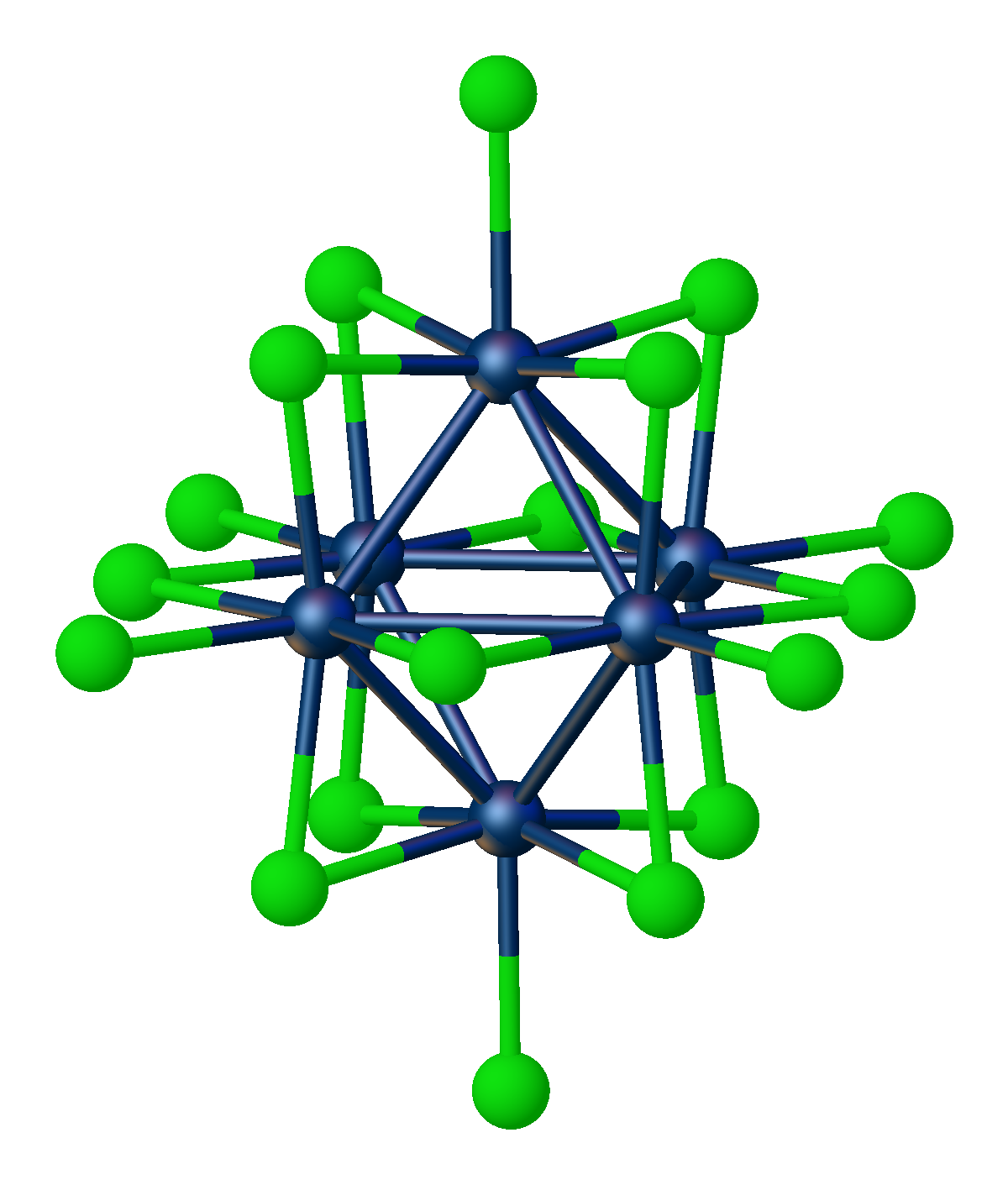
Structure of W_{6}Cl_{18}, tungsten trichloride

Tungsten forms chemical compounds in oxidation states from −2 to +6. Higher oxidation states, usually as oxides, are relevant to its terrestrial occurrence and its biological roles, mid-level oxidation states are often associated with metal clusters, and very low oxidation states are typically associated with CO complexes. The chemistries of tungsten and molybdenum show strong similarities to each other, as well as contrasts with their lighter congener, chromium. Simplest tungsten(VI) oxide the trioxide WO_{3}), which is polymeric. Tungsten(VI) oxide is soluble in aqueous base, forming tungstate WO_{4}^{2−}. This oxyanion condenses at lower pH values, forming polyoxotungstates.

The broad range of oxidation states of tungsten is reflected in its various chlorides:

- Tungsten(II) chloride, which exists as the hexamer W_{6}Cl_{12}
- Tungsten(III) chloride, which exists as the hexamer W_{6}Cl_{18}
- Tungsten(IV) chloride, WCl_{4}, a black solid, which adopts a polymeric structure.
- Tungsten(V) chloride, WCl_{5}, a black solid which adopts a dimeric structure.
- Tungsten(VI) chloride, WCl_{6}, which contrasts with the instability of MoCl_{6}.

Organotungsten compounds are numerous and also span a range of oxidation states. Notable examples include the trigonal prismatic W(CH_{3})_{6} and octahedral W(CO)_{6}, with an oxidation state of 0.

== Production ==
Tungsten production

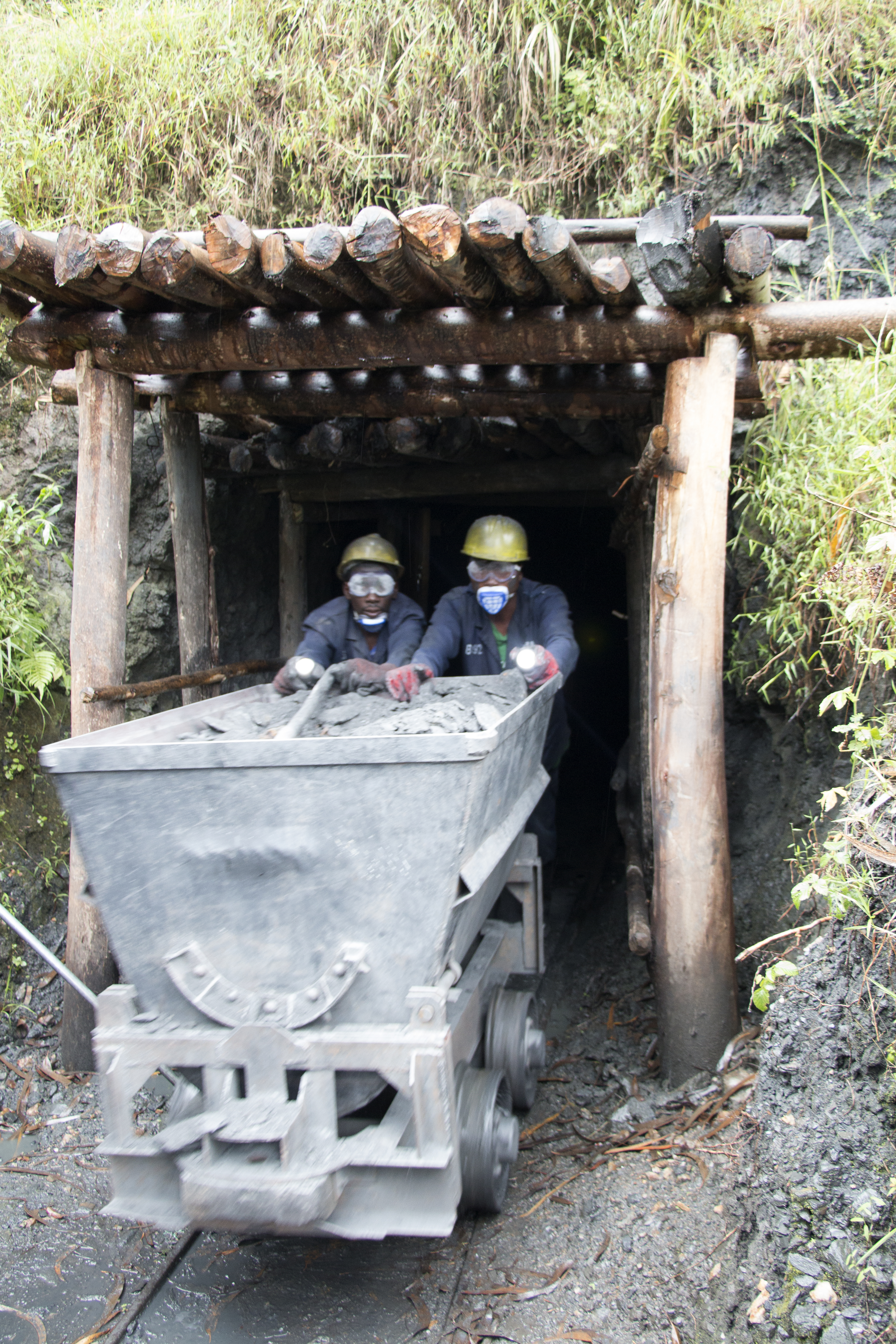
Tungsten mining in Rwanda forms an important part of the country's economy.

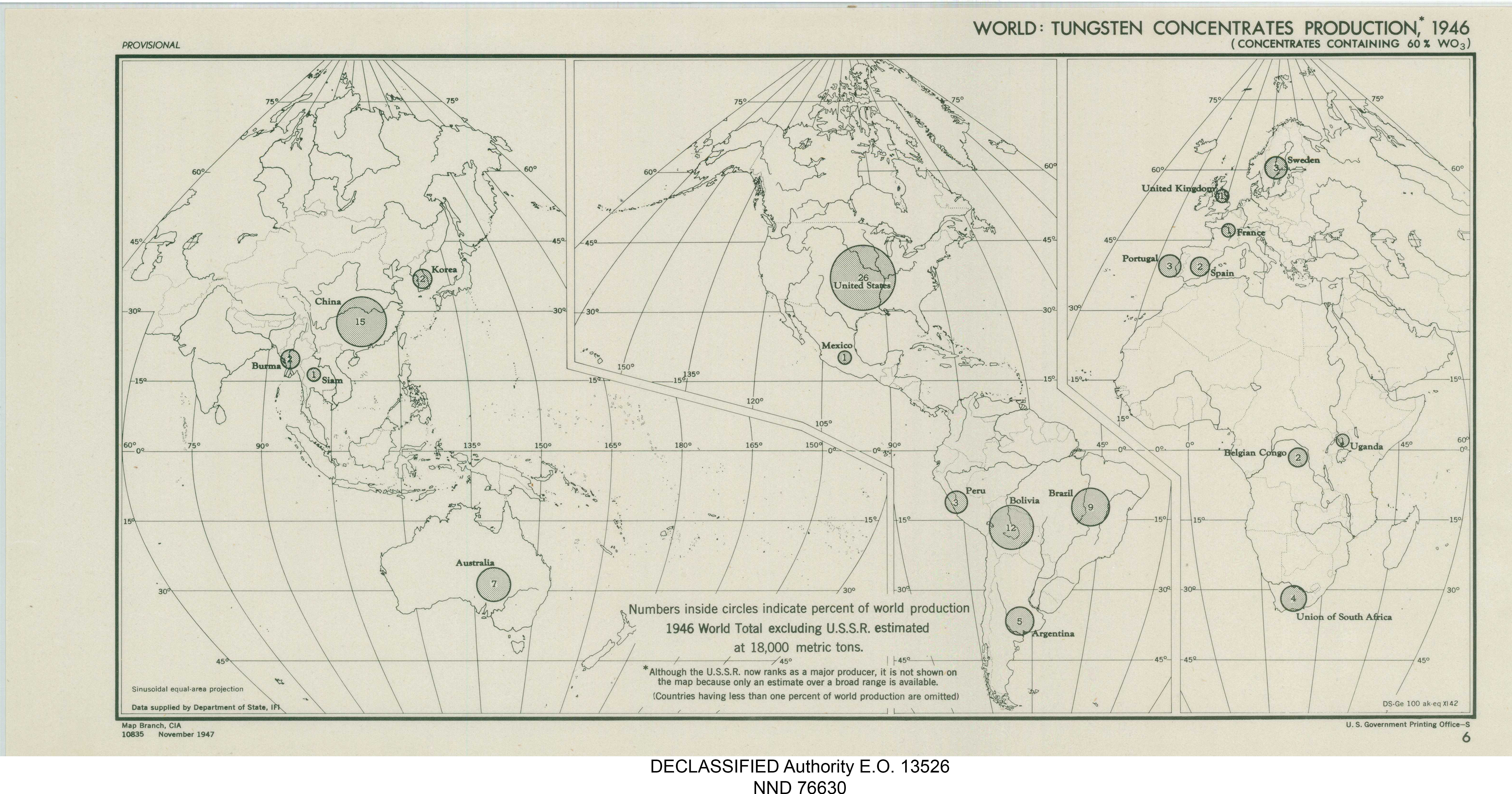
Tungsten concentrate production, 1946

Global tungsten production from mining totalled 85,000 tonnes (tungsten content in mined material) in 2025, up from 82,000 tonnes in 2024. In 2013 about 34% of total tungsten production came from recycled tungsten-rich scrap, rather than from mined ores.

In 2025, China, Vietnam and Kazakhstan were the leading suppliers with 67,000, 3,000, and 2,400 tonnes, respectively. China is the world's leader not only in production but in export and consumption of tungsten products, and its use is strictly regulated by the Chinese government.

Within the EU, the Austrian Felbertal scheelite deposit is one of the few producing tungsten mines. Portugal is one of Europe's main tungsten producers, with 121 kt of contained tungsten in mineral concentrates from 1910 to 2020, accounting for roughly 3.3% of global production. Deposits in Austria are still considered the most important throughout Europe, though operations have been repeatedly suspended due to the metal's low price.

Tungsten is considered to be a conflict mineral due to the unethical mining practices observed in the Democratic Republic of the Congo.

=== Reserves ===
The world's estimated reserves of tungsten are greater than 4,700,000 tonnes; they are mostly located in China (2,500,000 t), Australia (570,000 t), Russia (400,000 t) and Vietnam (170,000 t). Canada ceased production in late 2015 due to the closure of its sole tungsten mine, but it had 290,000 t of reserves at that time..

South Korea's Sangdong mine, one of the world's largest tungsten mines with 7,890 tonnes of high-grade tungsten reportedly buried, was closed in 1994 due to low profitability but has since re-registered mining rights and resumed activities in 2026.

There is a large deposit of tungsten ore on the edge of Dartmoor in the United Kingdom, which was exploited during World War I and World War II as the Hemerdon Mine. Following increases in tungsten prices, this mine was reactivated in 2014, but ceased activities in 2018.

=== Extraction ===
Because of tungsten's high melting point, it is often mixed with other metals and sintered at lower temperatures to form alloys. Tungsten's tendency to form alloys makes it difficult to produce as a pure metal, as heating the oxide with coal will produce tungsten carbide. Pure tungsten may be extracted from ore by a multi-step process, starting with the addition of ammonia to an aqueous tungstate solution. The precipitate from this mixture is filtered off and dried at 600 °C (1,112 °F) to yield relatively pure tungsten(VI) oxide (WO_{3}). This oxide is heated with hydrogen or carbon to produce powdered tungsten:

WO_{3} + 3 H_{2} → W + 3 H_{2}O

Tungsten can also be extracted by hydrogen reduction of WF_{6}, which is a common technique used to form thin films of tungsten on integrated circuits:

WF_{6} + 3 H_{2} → W + 6 HF

or pyrolytic decomposition:

WF_{6} → W + 3 F_{2} (Δ_{r}H = +)

Tungsten is not traded as a futures contract and cannot be tracked on exchanges like the London Metal Exchange. The tungsten industry often uses independent pricing references such as Argus Media or Metal Bulletin as a basis for contracts. The prices are usually quoted for tungsten concentrate or WO_{3}.

== Applications ==
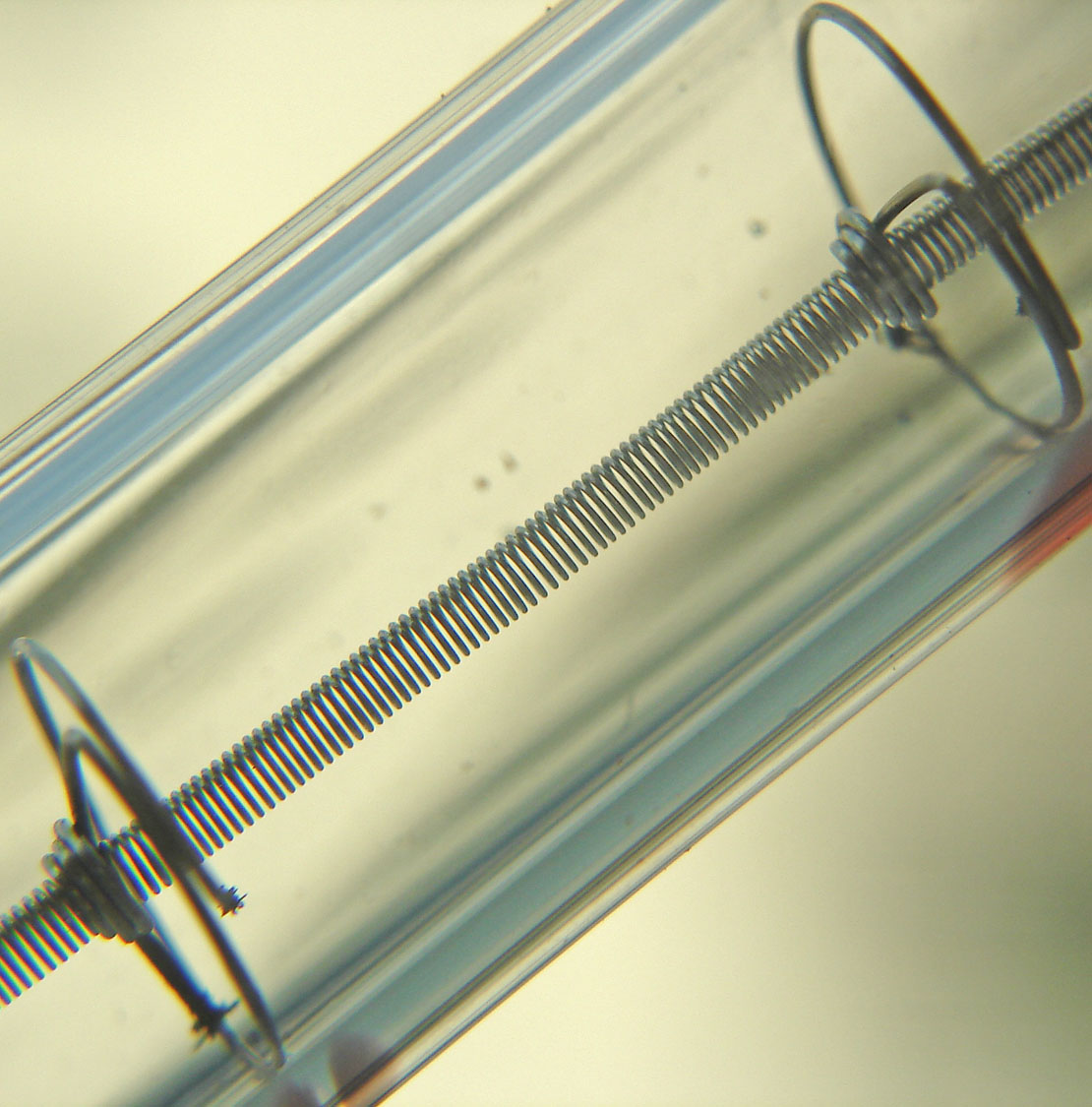
Close-up of a tungsten filament inside a halogen lamp

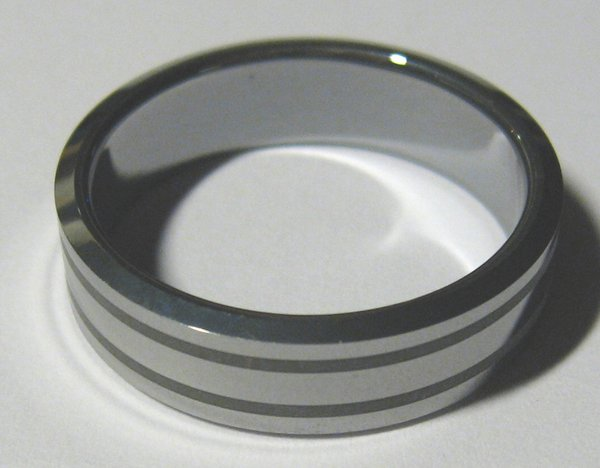
Tungsten carbide jewelry

Tungsten is used in pure form and as alloys and compounds for a wide range of purposes. Tungsten carbide and other cemented tungsten carbides make up 60 to 70% of global tungsten usage, and steels and other alloys make up roughly 20 to 30%. The rest of its products in other chemical compounds make up less than 10% of total tungsten usage. Because of the high ductile-brittle transition temperature of tungsten, its products are conventionally manufactured through powder metallurgy, spark plasma sintering, chemical vapor deposition, hot isostatic pressing, and thermoplastic routes. A more flexible manufacturing alternative is selective laser melting, which is a form of 3D printing and allows creating complex three-dimensional shapes.

=== Industrial ===
Tungsten is mainly used in the production of hard materials based on tungsten carbide (WC), one of the hardest carbides. WC is an efficient electrical conductor, but W_{2}C is less so. WC is used to make wear-resistant abrasives, and "carbide" cutting tools such as knives, drills, circular saws, dies, milling and turning tools used by the metalworking, woodworking, mining, petroleum and construction industries. Carbide tooling is actually a ceramic/metal composite, where metallic cobalt acts as a binding (matrix) material to hold the WC particles in place. This type of industrial use accounts for about 60% of current tungsten consumption.

The jewelry industry makes rings of sintered tungsten carbide, tungsten carbide/metal composites, and also metallic tungsten. WC/metal composite rings use nickel as the metal matrix in place of cobalt because it takes a higher luster when polished. Sometimes manufacturers or retailers refer to tungsten carbide as a metal, but it is a ceramic. Because of tungsten carbide's hardness, rings made of this material are extremely abrasion resistant, and will hold a burnished finish longer than rings made of metallic tungsten. Tungsten carbide rings are brittle, however, and may crack under a sharp blow.

=== Alloys ===
The hardness and heat resistance of tungsten can contribute to useful alloys. A good example is high-speed steel, which can contain as much as 18% tungsten. Tungsten's high melting point makes tungsten a good material for applications like rocket nozzles, for example in the UGM-27 Polaris submarine-launched ballistic missile. Tungsten alloys are used in a wide range of applications, including the aerospace and automotive industries and radiation shielding. Superalloys containing tungsten, such as Stellite, are used in turbine blades and wear-resistant parts and coatings.

Tungsten's heat resistance makes it useful in arc welding applications when combined with another highly-conductive metal such as silver or copper. The silver or copper provides the necessary conductivity and the tungsten allows the welding rod to withstand the high temperatures of the arc welding environment.

==== Permanent magnets ====
Quenched (martensitic) tungsten steel (approx. 5.5–7.0% W with 0.5–0.7% C) was used for making hard permanent magnets, due to its high remanence and coercivity, as noted by John Hopkinson (1849–1898) as early as 1885. These tungsten steels were among the first permanent magnets produced through metal alloying. Chromium steel magnets were also developed in 1885, and these became more popular during World War I, when the supply of tungsten was limited. KS Steel, an alloy with coercivity nearly three times that of tungsten steel, was developed in 1917 and was one of the last major magnetic alloys to use tungsten (at a proportion of 5–9%), though it was the first in a long line of permanent magnet discoveries by Japanese scientists in the 20th century.

=== Military ===
Tungsten, usually alloyed with manganese, cobalt, copper, or molybdenum to form heavy alloys, is used in kinetic energy penetrators as an alternative to depleted uranium. Uranium is problematic in munitions due to its radioactivity, both in processing and handling. Similarly, tungsten alloys have also been used in ammunition, largely alloyed with nickel or cobalt as a dense material used in place of depleted uranium. Germany used tungsten during World War II to produce cores of shells for anti-tank guns and tips for machine tools. The weapons were highly effective, but a shortage of tungsten caused in part by the Wolfram Crisis limited their use, as the country had no native sources of the metal.

Tungsten has also been used in dense inert metal explosives, which use it as dense powder to reduce collateral damage while increasing the lethality of explosives within a small radius.

=== Chemical applications ===
Tungsten(IV) sulfide is a high temperature lubricant and is a component of catalysts for hydrodesulfurization. MoS_{2} is more commonly used for such applications.

Tungsten oxides are used in ceramic glazes and calcium/magnesium tungstates are used widely in fluorescent lighting. Crystal tungstates are used as scintillation detectors in nuclear physics and nuclear medicine. Other salts that contain tungsten are used in the chemical and tanning industries. Tungsten oxide (WO_{3}) is incorporated into selective catalytic reduction (SCR) catalysts found in coal-fired power plants. These catalysts convert nitrogen oxides (NOx) to nitrogen (N_{2}) and water (H_{2}O) using ammonia (NH_{3}). The tungsten oxide helps with the physical strength of the catalyst and extends catalyst life. Tungsten containing catalysts are promising for epoxidation, oxidation, and hydrogenolysis reactions. Tungsten heteropoly acids are key component of multifunctional catalysts. Tungstates can be used as photocatalyst, while the tungsten sulfide as electrocatalyst.

=== Niche uses ===
Applications requiring its high density include weights, counterweights, ballast keels for yachts, tail ballast for commercial aircraft, rotor weights for civil and military helicopters, and as ballast in race cars for NASCAR and Formula One. Being slightly less than twice the density, tungsten is seen as an alternative (albeit more expensive) to lead fishing sinkers. Depleted uranium is also used for these purposes, due to its similarly high density. 75-kilogram (165-pound) blocks of tungsten were used as "cruise balance mass devices" on the entry vehicle portion of the 2012 Mars Science Laboratory spacecraft. It is an ideal material to use as a dolly for riveting, where the mass necessary for good results can be achieved in a compact bar. High-density alloys of tungsten with nickel, copper or iron are used in high-quality darts (to allow for a smaller diameter and thus tighter groupings) or for artificial flies (tungsten beads allow the fly to sink rapidly). Tungsten is also used as a heavy bolt to lower the rate of fire of the SWD M11/9 sub-machine gun from 1300 RPM to 700 RPM. Some string instrument strings incorporates tungsten. Tungsten is used as an absorber on the electron telescope on the Cosmic Ray System of the two Voyager spacecraft.

=== Gold substitution ===
Its density, similar to that of gold, allows tungsten to be used in jewelry as an alternative to gold or platinum. Tungsten carbide is used in jewelry that is intended to be wear-resistant.

Because tungsten is only 0.36% less dense than gold, and costs about a thousand times less, tungsten can also be used in counterfeiting of gold bars, such as by plating a tungsten bar with gold, which has been observed since the 1980s, or by taking an existing gold bar, drilling holes, and replacing the removed gold with tungsten rods. The densities are not exactly the same, and other properties of gold and tungsten differ, but gold-plated tungsten will pass superficial tests.

=== Electronics ===
Because it retains its strength at high temperatures and has a high melting point, elemental tungsten is used in many high-temperature applications, such as incandescent light bulb, cathode-ray tube, and vacuum tube filaments, heating elements, and rocket engine nozzles. Its high melting point also makes tungsten suitable for aerospace and high-temperature uses such as electrical, heating, and welding applications, notably in the gas tungsten arc welding process (also called tungsten inert gas (TIG) welding).

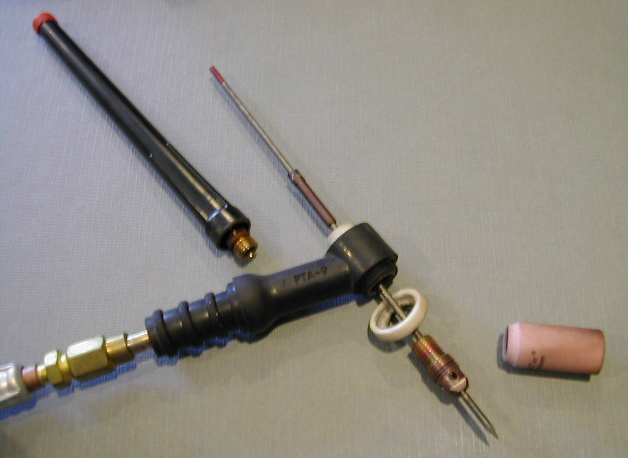
Tungsten electrode used in a gas tungsten arc welding torch

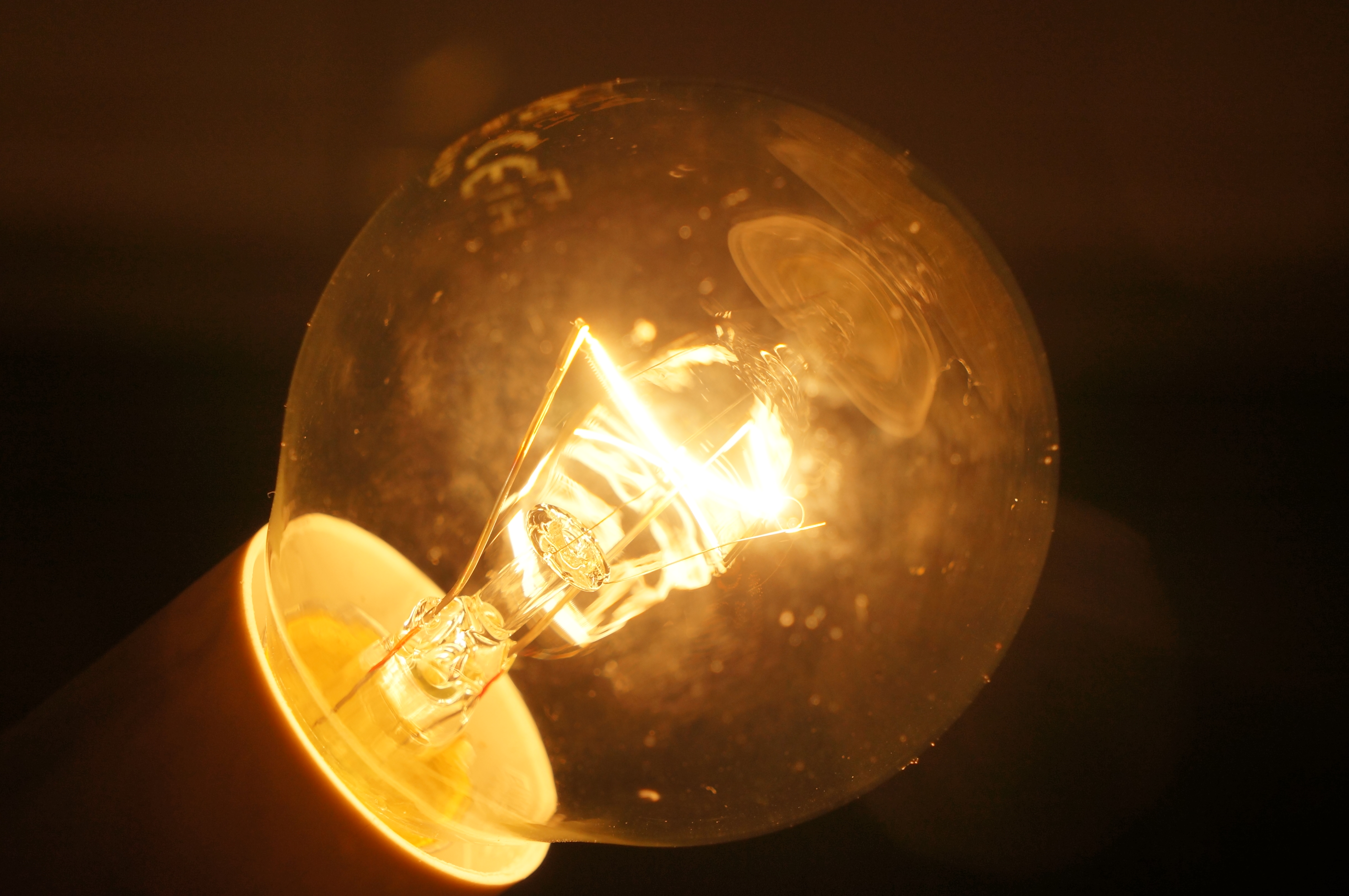
Tungsten filament is used in incandescent lightbulbs, where it is heated until it glows

Because of its conductive properties and relative chemical inertness, tungsten is also used in electrodes, and in the emitter tips in electron-beam instruments that use field emission guns, such as electron microscopes. In electronics, tungsten is used as an interconnect material in integrated circuits, between the silicon dioxide dielectric material and the transistors. It is used in metallic films, which replace the wiring used in conventional electronics with a coat of tungsten (or molybdenum) on silicon.

The electronic structure of tungsten makes it one of the main sources for X-ray targets, and also for shielding from high-energy radiations (such as in the radiopharmaceutical industry for shielding radioactive samples of FDG). It is also used in gamma imaging as a material from which coded apertures are made, due to its excellent shielding properties. Tungsten powder is used as a filler material in plastic composites, which are used as a nontoxic substitute for lead in bullets, shot, and radiation shields. Since this element's thermal expansion is similar to borosilicate glass, it is used for making glass-to-metal seals. In addition to its high melting point, when tungsten is doped with potassium, it leads to an increased shape stability (compared with non-doped tungsten). This ensures that the filament does not sag, and no undesired changes occur.

Tungsten is used in producing vibration motors, also known as mobile vibrators. These motors are integral components that provide tactile feedback to users, alerting them to incoming calls, messages, and notifications. Tungsten's high density, hardness, and wear resistance property help to endure the high-speed rotational vibrations these motors generate.

=== Nanowires ===
Through top-down nanofabrication processes, tungsten nanowires have been fabricated and studied since 2002. Due to a particularly high surface to volume ratio, the formation of a surface oxide layer and the single crystal nature of such material, the mechanical properties differ fundamentally from those of bulk tungsten. Such tungsten nanowires have potential applications in nanoelectronics, and as pH probes and gas sensors. In similarity to silicon nanowires, tungsten nanowires are frequently produced from a bulk tungsten precursor followed by a thermal oxidation step to control morphology in terms of length and aspect ratio.

=== Fusion power ===
Due to its high melting point and good erosion resistance, tungsten is a lead candidate for the most exposed sections of the plasma-facing inner wall of nuclear fusion reactors. Tungsten, as a plasma-facing component material, features exceptionally low tritium retention through co-deposition and implantation, which enhances safety by minimizing radioactive inventory, improves fuel efficiency by making more fuel available for fusion reactions, and supports operational continuity by reducing the need for frequent fuel removal from surfaces. It was used as the plasma-facing material of the divertor in the JET test reactor until its closure in December 2023 and will be used for the same purpose in the ITER reactor.

== Biological role ==
Tungsten, at atomic number Z = 74, is the heaviest element known to be biologically functional. It is used by some bacteria and archaea, but not in eukaryotes. For example, enzymes called oxidoreductases use tungsten similarly to molybdenum by using it in a tungsten-pterin complex with molybdopterin (molybdopterin, despite its name, does not contain molybdenum, but may complex with either molybdenum or tungsten in use by living organisms). Tungsten-using enzymes typically reduce carboxylic acids to aldehydes. The tungsten oxidoreductases may also catalyse oxidations. The first tungsten-requiring enzyme to be discovered also requires selenium, and in this case the tungsten-selenium pair may function analogously to the molybdenum-sulfur pairing of some molybdopterin-requiring enzymes. One of the enzymes in the oxidoreductase family which sometimes employ tungsten (bacterial formate dehydrogenase H) is known to use a selenium-molybdenum version of molybdopterin. Acetylene hydratase is an unusual metalloenzyme in that it catalyzes a hydration reaction. Two reaction mechanisms have been proposed, in one of which there is a direct interaction between the tungsten atom and the C≡C triple bond. Although a tungsten-containing xanthine dehydrogenase from bacteria has been found to contain tungsten-molydopterin and also non-protein bound selenium, a tungsten-selenium molybdopterin complex has not been definitively described.

In soil, tungsten metal oxidizes to the tungstate anion. It can be selectively or non-selectively imported by some prokaryotic organisms and may substitute for molybdate in certain enzymes. Its effect on the action of these enzymes is in some cases inhibitory and in others positive. The soil's chemistry determines how the tungsten polymerizes; alkaline soils cause monomeric tungstates; acidic soils cause polymeric tungstates.

Sodium tungstate and lead have been studied for their effect on earthworms. Lead was found to be lethal at low levels and sodium tungstate was much less toxic, but the tungstate completely inhibited their reproductive ability.

Tungsten has been studied as a biological copper metabolic antagonist, in a role similar to the action of molybdenum. It has been found that tetrathiotungstate salts may be used as biological copper chelation chemicals, similar to the tetrathiomolybdates.

=== In archaea ===
Tungsten is essential for some archaea. Several tungsten-utilizing enzymes are known, including:

- Aldehyde ferredoxin oxidoreductase (AOR) in Thermococcus strain ES-1
- Formaldehyde ferredoxin oxidoreductase (FOR) in Thermococcus litoralis
- Glyceraldehyde-3-phosphate ferredoxin oxidoreductase (GAPOR) in Pyrococcus furiosus

A wtp system is known to selectively transport tungsten in archaea:

- WtpA is tungsten-binding protein of ABC family of transporters
- WtpB is a permease
- WtpC is ATPase

Mod and Tup systems, which belong to the ABC family, have also been identified in tungsten-utilizing archaea.

== Health factors ==
Tungsten
Hazards
- GHS labelling
Pictograms	(GHS02: Flammable)
Signal word	Warning
NFPA 704 (fire diamond)	1 3 0

Because tungsten is a rare metal and its compounds are generally inert, the effects of tungsten on the environment are limited. The abundance of tungsten in the Earth's crust is thought to be about 1.5 parts per million. It is the 58th most abundant element found on Earth.

It was at first believed to be a relatively inert and only slightly toxic metal, but beginning in the year 2000, tungsten alloys and their dusts and particulates were found to induce cancer and several other adverse effects in animals and humans in both in vitro and in vivo experiments.

The median lethal dose LD_{50} depends strongly on the animal and the method of administration and varies between 59 mg/kg (intravenous, rabbits) and 5000 mg/kg (tungsten metal powder, intraperitoneal, rats).

People can be exposed to tungsten in the workplace by breathing it in, swallowing it, skin contact, or eye contact. The National Institute for Occupational Safety and Health (NIOSH) has set a recommended exposure limit (REL) of 5 mg/m^{3} over an 8-hour workday and a short term limit of 10 mg/m^{3}.

== Sources ==
- Sicius, Hermann (2024). "Chromium Group: Elements of the Sixth Subgroup". Handbook of the Chemical Elements. pp. 581–631. doi:10.1007/978-3-662-68921-9_11. ISBN 978-3-662-68920-2.
- Lassner, Erik; Schubert, Wolf-Dieter (1999). Tungsten. doi:10.1007/978-1-4615-4907-9. ISBN 978-1-4613-7225-7.
- Trasorras, Juan R. L.; Wolfe, Thomas A.; Knabl, Wolfram; Venezia, Carmen; Lemus, Ranulfo; Lassner, Erik; Schubert, Wolf-Dieter; Lüderitz, Eberhard; Wolf, Hans-Uwe (2016). "Tungsten, Tungsten Alloys, and Tungsten Compounds". Ullmann's Encyclopedia of Industrial Chemistry. Weinheim: Wiley-VCH. pp. 1–53. doi:10.1002/14356007.a27_229.pub2. ISBN 978-3-527-30385-4.
