= Nucleoside oxidase (H2O2-forming) =

Enzyme class

Nucleoside oxidase (H_{2}O_{2}-forming)
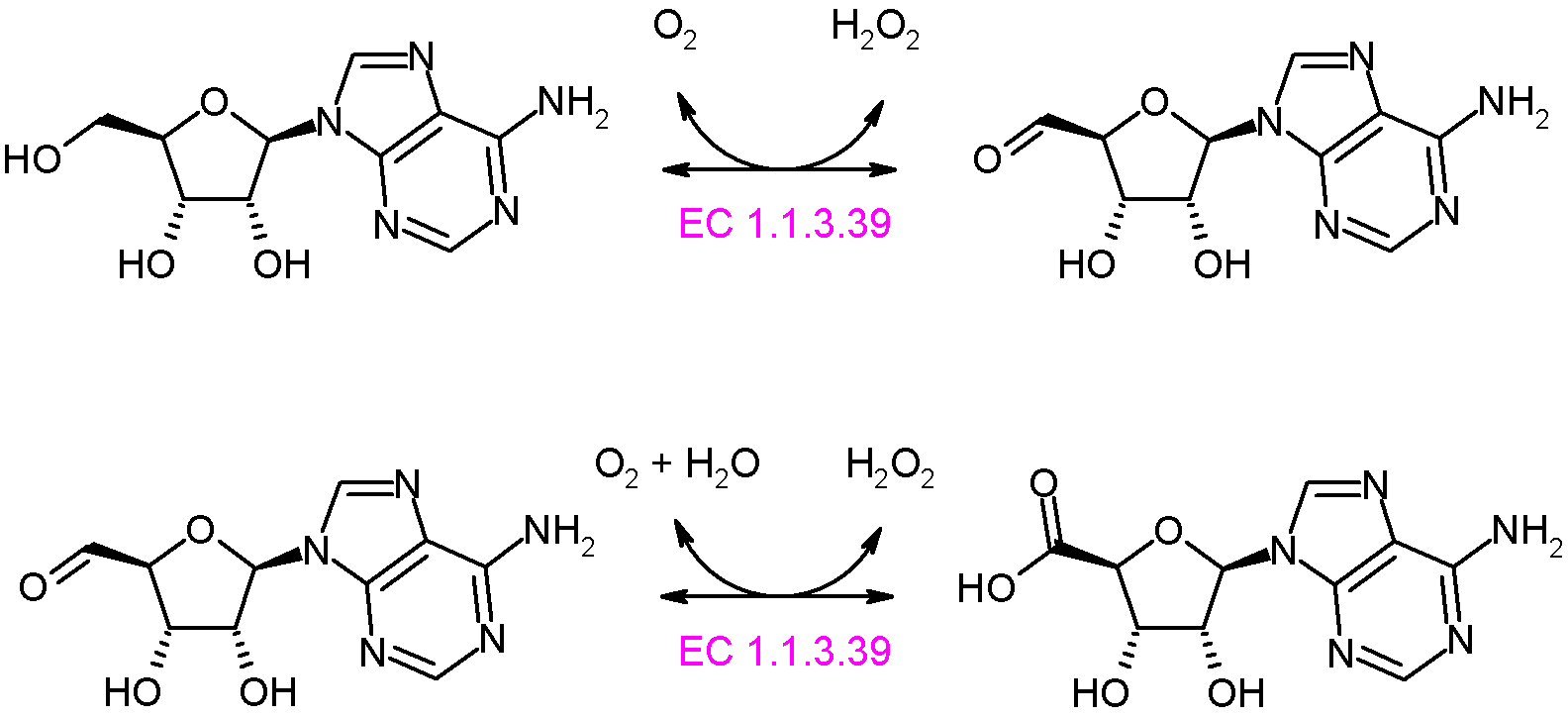

Identifiers
- EC no.: 1.1.3.39

Databases
- IntEnz: IntEnz view
- BRENDA: BRENDA entry
- ExPASy: NiceZyme view
- KEGG: KEGG entry
- MetaCyc: metabolic pathway
- PRIAM: profile
- PDB structures: RCSB PDB PDBe PDBsum
Search
- PMC: articles
- PubMed: articles
- NCBI: proteins

Nucleoside oxidase (H_{2}O_{2}-forming) (EC 1.1.3.39) is an enzyme with systematic name nucleoside:oxygen 5'-oxidoreductase (H_{2}O_{2}-forming). This enzyme catalyses the following overall chemical reaction:

adenosine
+ H_{2}O
2 O_{2}
2 H_{2}O_{2}
2 O_{2}
2 H_{2}O_{2}
9-riburonosyladenine

This enzyme contains heme and belongs to a flavoprotein family.
