= Dehydrogluconate dehydrogenase =

dehydrogluconate dehydrogenase

Identifiers
- EC no.: 1.1.99.4
- CAS no.: 9028-82-4

Databases
- BRENDA: enzyme data
- ExPASy: NiceZyme view
- KEGG: enzyme entry
- MetaCyc: metabolic pathway
- Rhea: reactions
- PDB structures: RCSB PDB PDBe PDBsum
- Gene Ontology: AmiGO / QuickGO
Search
- PMC: articles
- PubMed: articles
- NCBI: proteins

In enzymology, dehydrogluconate dehydrogenase (EC 1.1.99.4) is an enzyme that catalyzes the chemical reaction

2-dehydro-D-gluconic acid
+ electron acceptor
2,5-didehydro-D-gluconic acid
+ reduced acceptor

The two substrates of this enzyme are 2-dehydro-D-gluconic acid and an electron acceptor. Its products are 2,5-didehydro-D-gluconic acid and the corresponding reduced acceptor.

This enzyme belongs to the family of oxidoreductases, specifically those acting on the CH-OH group of donor with other acceptors. The systematic name of this enzyme class is 2-dehydro-D-gluconate:acceptor 2-oxidoreductase. Other names in common use include ketogluconate dehydrogenase, alpha-ketogluconate dehydrogenase, 2-keto-D-gluconate dehydrogenase, and 2-oxogluconate dehydrogenase. It has 2 cofactors: FAD, and a flavoprotein.
