= Beta-carotene 3-hydroxylase =

Class of enzymes

Identifiers
- EC no.: 1.14.13.129
- CAS no.: 133425-64-6

Databases
- IntEnz: IntEnz view
- BRENDA: BRENDA entry
- ExPASy: NiceZyme view
- KEGG: KEGG entry
- MetaCyc: metabolic pathway
- PRIAM: profile
- PDB structures: RCSB PDB PDBe PDBsum
Search
- PMC: articles
- PubMed: articles
- NCBI: proteins

Beta-carotene 3-hydroxylase (EC 1.14.13.129, beta-carotene 3,3'-monooxygenase, CrtZ) is an enzyme with systematic name beta-carotene,NADH:oxygen 3-oxidoreductase . This enzyme catalyses the following chemical reaction

beta-carotene + 2 NADH + 2 H^{+} + 2 O_{2} $\rightleftharpoons$ zeaxanthin + 2 NAD^{+} + 2 H_{2}O (overall reaction)
(1a) beta-carotene + NADH + H^{+} + O_{2} $\rightleftharpoons$ beta-cryptoxanthin + NAD^{+} + H_{2}O
(1b) beta-cryptoxanthin + NADH + H^{+} + O_{2} $\rightleftharpoons$ zeaxanthin + NAD^{+} + H_{2}O

Beta-carotene 3-hydroxylase requires ferredoxin and Fe(II).
