= 6-hydroxynicotinate reductase =

Class of enzymes

Identifiers
- EC no.: 1.3.7.1
- CAS no.: 9030-84-6

Databases
- IntEnz: IntEnz view
- BRENDA: BRENDA entry
- ExPASy: NiceZyme view
- KEGG: KEGG entry
- MetaCyc: metabolic pathway
- PRIAM: profile
- PDB structures: RCSB PDB PDBe PDBsum
- Gene Ontology: AmiGO / QuickGO
Search
- PMC: articles
- PubMed: articles
- NCBI: proteins

In enzymology, 6-hydroxynicotinate reductase (EC 1.3.7.1) is an enzyme that catalyzes the chemical reaction

6-hydroxynicotinic acid
+ reduced ferredoxin
1,4,5,6-tetrahydro-6-oxonicotinic acid
+ oxidised ferredoxin

The two substrates of this enzyme are 6-hydroxynicotinic acid and reduced ferredoxin. Its products are 1,4,5,6-tetrahydro-6-oxonicotinic acid and oxidized ferredoxin.

This enzyme belongs to the family of oxidoreductases, specifically those acting on the CH-CH group of donor with an iron-sulfur protein as acceptor. The systematic name of this enzyme class is 6-oxo-1,4,5,6-tetrahydronicotinate:ferredoxin oxidoreductase. Other names in common use include 6-oxotetrahydronicotinate dehydrogenase, 6-hydroxynicotinic reductase, HNA reductase, and 1,4,5,6-tetrahydro-6-oxonicotinate:ferredoxin oxidoreductase.
