= Phycoerythrobilin:ferredoxin oxidoreductase =

phycoerythrobilin:ferredoxin oxidoreductase

Identifiers
- EC no.: 1.3.7.3
- CAS no.: 347401-21-2

Databases
- IntEnz: IntEnz view
- BRENDA: BRENDA entry
- ExPASy: NiceZyme view
- KEGG: KEGG entry
- MetaCyc: metabolic pathway
- PRIAM: profile
- PDB structures: RCSB PDB PDBe PDBsum
- Gene Ontology: AmiGO / QuickGO
Search
- PMC: articles
- PubMed: articles
- NCBI: proteins

In enzymology, a phycoerythrobilin:ferredoxin oxidoreductase (EC 1.3.7.3) is an enzyme that catalyzes the chemical reaction

15,16-dihydrobiliverdin
+ reduced
ferredoxin
(3Z)-phycoerythrobilin
+ oxidised
ferredoxin

The two substrates of this enzyme are 15,16-dihydrobiliverdin and reduced ferredoxin. Its products are (3Z)-phycoerythrobilin and oxidized ferredoxin.

This enzyme belongs to the family of oxidoreductases, specifically those acting on the CH-CH group of donor with an iron-sulfur protein as acceptor. The systematic name of this enzyme class is (3Z)-phycoerythrobilin:ferredoxin oxidoreductase. This enzyme is also called PebB. This enzyme participates in porphyrin and chlorophyll metabolism.
