= Mallory metal =

Proprietary name for an alloy of tungsten

Mallory metal is proprietary name for an alloy of tungsten, with other metallic elements added to improve machining.

Its primary use is as a balance weight which is added to the crankshaft of an automotive engine, where the existing counterweight is not large enough to compensate for the weight of the reciprocating and rotating components attached to the crankshaft's connecting rod journals. Rather than add to the counterweight by welding or fabrication, holes are drilled in structurally safe positions in the counterweights, and "slugs" (cylindrical dowels) of Mallory metal are inserted and fastened securely.

The difference in density between the replacement Mallory metal and the original steel is about 2:1, so the counterweight is heavier without changing its shape or size.
