= 15,16-dihydrobiliverdin:ferredoxin oxidoreductase =

InterPro Family

Identifiers
- EC no.: 1.3.7.2
- CAS no.: 347401-20-1

Databases
- IntEnz: IntEnz view
- BRENDA: BRENDA entry
- ExPASy: NiceZyme view
- KEGG: KEGG entry
- MetaCyc: metabolic pathway
- PRIAM: profile
- PDB structures: RCSB PDB PDBe PDBsum
- Gene Ontology: AmiGO / QuickGO
Search
- PMC: articles
- PubMed: articles
- NCBI: proteins

15,16-dihydrobiliverdin:ferredoxin oxidoreductase (EC 1.3.7.2) is an enzyme that catalyzes the following chemical reaction

biliverdin
+ reduced
ferredoxin
15,16-dihydrobiliverdin
+ oxidised
ferredoxin

The two substrates of this enzyme are biliverdin and reduced ferredoxin. Its products are 15,16-dihydrobiliverdin and oxidized ferredoxin.

== Classification ==
15,16-dihydrobiliverdin:ferredoxin oxidoreductase belongs to the family of oxidoreductases, specifically those acting on the CH-CH group of donor with an iron-sulfur protein as acceptor. The systematic name of this enzyme class is 15,16-dihydrobiliverdin:ferredoxin oxidoreductase. This enzyme is also called PebA. This enzyme participates in porphyrin and chlorophyll metabolism.
