= Phenacrylate decarboxylase =

phenacrylate decarboxylase

Identifiers
- EC no.: 4.1.1.102

Databases
- BRENDA: enzyme data
- ExPASy: NiceZyme view
- KEGG: enzyme entry
- MetaCyc: metabolic pathway
- Rhea: reactions
- PDB structures: RCSB PDB PDBe PDBsum
Search
- PMC: articles
- PubMed: articles
- NCBI: proteins

In enzymology, a phenacrylate decarboxylase (EC 4.1.1.102) is an enzyme that catalyzes the chemical reaction

4-coumarate $\rightleftharpoons$ 4-vinylphenol + CO_{2}

Hence, this enzyme has one substrate, 4-coumarate, and two products, 4-vinylphenol and carbon dioxide.

This enzyme belongs to the family of lyases, specifically the carboxy-lyases, which cleave carbon-carbon bonds. The systematic name of this enzyme class is 3-phenylprop-2-enoate carboxy-lyase. Other names in common use include ferulic acid decarboxylase, and phenolic acid decarboxylase. It employs a prenylated flavin cofactor.
