= Putidaredoxin—NAD+ reductase =

Putidaredoxin—NAD^{+} reductase

Identifiers
- EC no.: 1.18.1.5

Databases
- IntEnz: IntEnz view
- BRENDA: BRENDA entry
- ExPASy: NiceZyme view
- KEGG: KEGG entry
- MetaCyc: metabolic pathway
- PRIAM: profile
- PDB structures: RCSB PDB PDBe PDBsum
Search
- PMC: articles
- PubMed: articles
- NCBI: proteins

Putidaredoxin—NAD^{+} reductase (EC 1.18.1.5, putidaredoxin reductase, camA (gene)) is an enzyme with systematic name putidaredoxin:NAD^{+} oxidoreductase. This enzyme catalyses the following chemical reaction

reduced putidaredoxin + NAD^{+} $\rightleftharpoons$ oxidized putidaredoxin + NADH + H^{+}

Putidaredoxin—NAD^{+} reductase requires FAD.
