= Nitric oxide reductase (NAD(P), nitrous oxide-forming) =

Identifiers
- EC no.: 1.7.1.14

Databases
- IntEnz: IntEnz view
- BRENDA: BRENDA entry
- ExPASy: NiceZyme view
- KEGG: KEGG entry
- MetaCyc: metabolic pathway
- PRIAM: profile
- PDB structures: RCSB PDB PDBe PDBsum
Search
- PMC: articles
- PubMed: articles
- NCBI: proteins

Nitric oxide reductase (NAD(P), nitrous oxide-forming) (EC 1.7.1.14, fungal nitric oxide reductase, cytochrome P450nor, NOR (ambiguous)) is an enzyme with systematic name nitrous oxide:NAD(P) oxidoreductase. This enzyme catalyses the following chemical reaction

N_{2}O + NAD(P)^{+} + H_{2}O $\rightleftharpoons$ 2 NO + NAD(P)H + H^{+}

This enzyme is heme-thiolate protein (P450).
