= Fatty-acid peroxygenase =

Identifiers
- EC no.: 1.11.2.4

Databases
- IntEnz: IntEnz view
- BRENDA: BRENDA entry
- ExPASy: NiceZyme view
- KEGG: KEGG entry
- MetaCyc: metabolic pathway
- PRIAM: profile
- PDB structures: RCSB PDB PDBe PDBsum
Search
- PMC: articles
- PubMed: articles
- NCBI: proteins

Fatty-acid peroxygenase (EC 1.11.2.4, fatty acid hydroxylase (ambiguous), P450 peroxygenase, CYP152A1, P450BS, P450SPalpha) is an enzyme with systematic name fatty acid:hydroperoxide oxidoreductase (RH-hydroxylating). This enzyme catalyses the following chemical reaction

fatty acid + H_{2}O_{2} $\rightleftharpoons$ 3- or 2-hydroxy fatty acid + H_{2}O

Fatty-acid peroxygenase is a cytosolic heme-thiolate protein.
