= FDX2 =

Mammalian protein found in Homo sapiens

Identifiers
- Aliases: FDX2, ferredoxin 2, FDX1L, ferredoxin 1 like, MEOAL
- External IDs: OMIM: 614585; MGI: 1915415; GeneCards: FDX2
Available structures
PDB	Ortholog search: PDBe RCSB
PDB	List of PDB id codes 2Y5C

Gene location (Human)
Chr.	Chromosome 19 (human)
Band	19p13.2	Start	10,310,045 bp
Band	19p13.2	End	10,316,015 bp

Gene location (Mouse)
Chr.	Chromosome 9 (mouse)
Band	9|9 A3	Start	21,067,520 bp
Band	9|9 A3	End	21,073,614 bp
RNA expression pattern
Bgee	Human / Mouse (ortholog); Top expressed in: prefrontal cortex; anterior cingulate cortex; Brodmann area 9; right frontal lobe; superior frontal gyrus; nucleus accumbens; hypothalamus; substantia nigra; temporal lobe; hippocampus proper / Top expressed in: quadriceps femoris muscle; white adipose tissue; bone marrow; muscle of thigh; striatum of neuraxis; muscle tissue; proximal tubule; embryo; skeletal muscle tissue; superior frontal gyrus; More reference expression data
BioGPS	n/a
Gene ontology
Molecular function	iron-sulfur cluster binding; protein binding; metal ion binding; 2 iron, 2 sulfur cluster binding; electron transfer activity
Cellular component	mitochondrial matrix; mitochondrion
Biological process	C21-steroid hormone biosynthetic process; sterol metabolic process; small molecule metabolic process; electron transport chain
Sources:Amigo / QuickGO
Orthologs
Databases	NCBI: entry; OMA: entry
Species	Human	Mouse
Entrez	112812	68165
Ensembl	ENSG00000267673	ENSMUSG00000079677
UniProt	Q6P4F2	Q9CPW2
RefSeq (mRNA)	NM_080665; NM_001031734; NM_001397406	NM_001039824
RefSeq (protein)	NP_001026904	NP_001034913
Location (UCSC)	Chr 19: 10.31 – 10.32 Mb	Chr 9: 21.07 – 21.07 Mb
PubMed search
- Wikidata
View/Edit Human	View/Edit Mouse

Ferredoxin 2 is a protein that in humans is encoded by the FDX2 gene. It participates in heme A synthesis and iron-sulphur protein synthesis.

Mutations in FDX2 cause mitochondrial myopathy.
