= Glyceraldehyde-3-phosphate dehydrogenase (ferredoxin) =

glyceraldehyde-3-phosphate dehydrogenase (ferredoxin)

Identifiers
- EC no.: 1.2.7.6

Databases
- IntEnz: IntEnz view
- BRENDA: BRENDA entry
- ExPASy: NiceZyme view
- KEGG: KEGG entry
- MetaCyc: metabolic pathway
- PRIAM: profile
- PDB structures: RCSB PDB PDBe PDBsum
- Gene Ontology: AmiGO / QuickGO
Search
- PMC: articles
- PubMed: articles
- NCBI: proteins

In enzymology, a glyceraldehyde-3-phosphate dehydrogenase (ferredoxin) (EC 1.2.7.6) is an enzyme that catalyzes the chemical reaction

D-glyceraldehyde-3-phosphate
+ 2 oxidised ferredoxin
H_{2}O
2 H^{+}
H_{2}O
2 H^{+}
3-phospho-D-glyceric acid
+ 2 reduced ferredoxin

The three substrates of this enzyme are D-glyceraldehyde-3-phosphate, oxidized ferredoxin, and water. Its products are 3-phospho-D-glyceric acid, reduced ferredoxin and two protons.

This enzyme belongs to the family of oxidoreductases, specifically those acting on the aldehyde or oxo group of donor with an iron-sulfur protein as acceptor. The systematic name of this enzyme class is D-glyceraldehyde-3-phosphate:ferredoxin oxidoreductase. Other names in common use include GAPOR, glyceraldehyde-3-phosphate Fd oxidoreductase, and glyceraldehyde-3-phosphate ferredoxin reductase.
