= High potential iron–sulfur protein =

High potential iron-sulfur protein
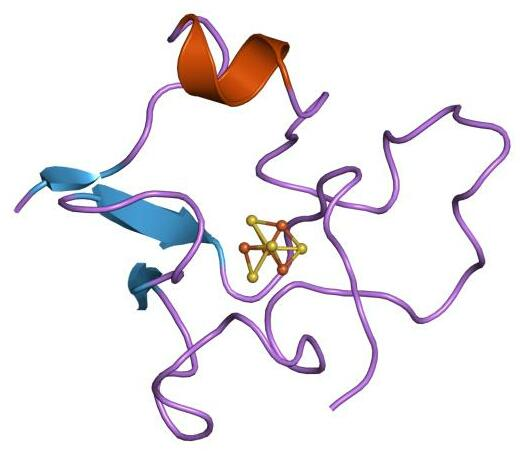
- Structure of the oxidized high-potential iron-sulfur protein.

Identifiers
- Symbol: HIPIP
- Pfam: PF01355
- InterPro: IPR000170
- PROSITE: PDOC00515
- SCOP2: 1hpi / SCOPe / SUPFAM
- OPM superfamily: 116
- OPM protein: 1hpi
Available protein structures:
- PDB: IPR000170 PF01355 (ECOD; PDBsum)
- AlphaFold: IPR000170; PF01355

High potential iron-sulfur proteins (HIPIP) are a class of iron-sulfur proteins. They are ferredoxins that participate in electron transfer in photosynthetic bacteria as well as in Paracoccus denitrificans.

== Structure ==
The HiPIPs are small proteins, typically containing 63 to 85 amino acid residues. The sequences show significant variation. As shown in the following schematic representation the iron-sulfur cluster is bound by four conserved cysteine residues.

                          [ 4Fe-4S cluster]
                          | |       |     |
       xxxxxxxxxxxxxxxxxxxCxCxxxxxxxCxxxxxCxxxx

C: conserved cysteine residue involved in the binding of the 4Fe-4S core.

== [Fe_{4}S_{4}] clusters ==
The [Fe_{4}S_{4}] clusters are abundant cofactors of metalloproteins. They participate in electron-transfer sequences. The core structure for the [Fe_{4}S_{4}] cluster is a cube with alternating Fe and S vertices. These clusters exist in two oxidation states with a small structural change. Two families of [Fe_{4}S_{4}] clusters are known: the ferredoxin (Fd) family and the high-potential iron–suflur protein (HiPIP) family. Both HiPIP and Fd share the same resting state: [Fe_{4}S_{4}]^{2+}, which have the same geometric and spectroscopic features. Differences arise when it comes to their active state: HiPIP forms by oxidation to [Fe_{4}S_{4}]^{3+}, and Fd is formed by reduction to [Fe_{4}S_{4}]^{+}.

$$\ce{\underset{(for\ HiPIP)}{[Fe4S4]^3+} <=>[\ce{oxidation}] \underset{(resting\ state)}{[Fe4S4]^2+} <=>[\ce{reduction}] \underset{(for\ Fd)}{[Fe4S4]+}}$$

The different oxidation states are explained by the proteins that combined with the [Fe_{4}S_{4}] cluster. Analysis from crystallographic data suggests that HiPIP is capable of preserving its higher oxidation state by forming fewer hydrogen bonds with water. The characteristic fold of the proteins wraps the [Fe_{4}S_{4}] cluster in a hydrophobic core, only being able to form about five conserved H-bond to the cluster ligands from the backbone. In contrast, the protein associated with the Fd's allows these clusters to contact solvent resulting in 8 protein H-bonding interactions. The protein binds Fd via conserved CysXXCysXXCys structure (X stands for any amino acid). Also, the unique protein structure and dipolar interactions from peptide and intermolecular water contribute to shielding the [Fe_{4}S_{4}]^{3+} cluster from the attack of random outside electron donors, which protects itself from hydrolysis.

== Synthetic analogues ==
HiPIP analogues can be synthesized by ligand exchange reactions of [Fe_{4}S_{4}{N(SiMe_{3})_{2}}_{4}]^{−} with 4 equiv of thiols (HSR) as follows:

[Fe_{4}S_{4}{N(SiMe_{3})_{2}}_{4}]^{−} + 4RSH → [Fe_{4}S_{4}(SR)_{4}]^{−} + 4 HN(SiMe_{3})_{2}

The precursor cluster [Fe_{4}S_{4}{N(SiMe_{3})_{2}}_{4}]^{−} can be synthesized by one-pot reaction of FeCl_{3}, NaN(SiMe_{3})_{2}, and NaSH. The synthesis of HiPIP analogues can help people understand the factors that cause variety redox of HiPIP.

== Biochemical reactions ==
HiPIPs take part in many oxidizing reactions in creatures, and are especially known with photosynthetic anaerobic bacteria, such as Chromatium, and Ectothiorhodospira. HiPIPs are periplasmic proteins in photosynthetic bacteria. They play a role of electron shuttles in the cyclic electron flow between the photosynthetic reaction center and the cytochrome bc_{1} complex. Other oxidation reactions HiPIP involved include catalyzing Fe(II) oxidation, being electron donor to reductase and electron accepter for some thiosulfate-oxidizing enzyme.
