= Adrenodoxin reductase =

Protein found in humans

FDXR

Identifiers
- Aliases: FDXR, ADXR, Adrenodoxin reductase, ferredoxin reductase, ANOA, ADR
- External IDs: OMIM: 103270; MGI: 104724; GeneCards: FDXR
Enzyme activity
EC #	BRENDA	ExPASy	KEGG	MetaCyc
1.18.1.6	↗	↗	↗	↗

Gene location (Human)
Chr.	Chromosome 17 (human)
Band	17q25.1	Start	74,862,497 bp
Band	17q25.1	End	74,873,031 bp

Gene location (Mouse)
Chr.	Chromosome 11 (mouse)
Band	11|11 E2	Start	115,158,850 bp
Band	11|11 E2	End	115,167,876 bp
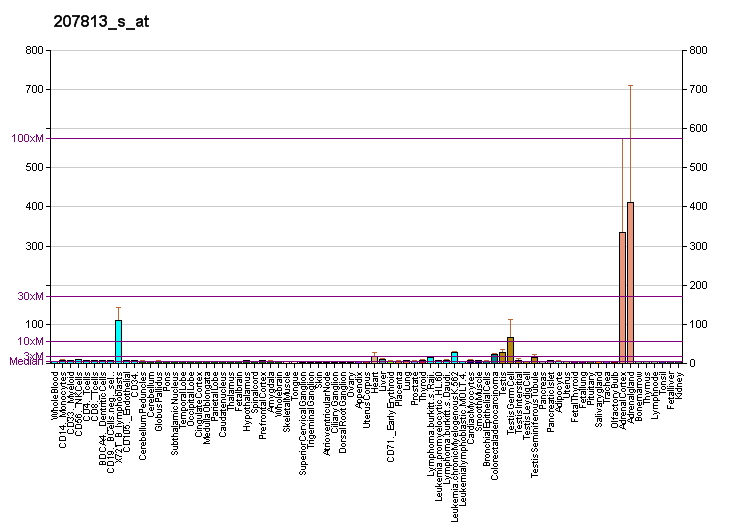
RNA expression pattern
Bgee	Human / Mouse (ortholog); Top expressed in: right adrenal cortex; left adrenal cortex; testicle; right testis; left testis; right uterine tube; spleen; left ovary; right ovary; right hemisphere of cerebellum / Top expressed in: adrenal gland; neural layer of retina; ectoderm; otic vesicle; saccule; otic placode; Gonadal ridge; cumulus cell; superior frontal gyrus; spermatocyte; More reference expression data
BioGPS	More reference expression data
Gene ontology
Molecular function	oxidoreductase activity; ferredoxin-NADP+ reductase activity; NADPH-adrenodoxin reductase activity
Cellular component	mitochondrion; mitochondrial inner membrane; mitochondrial matrix; membrane
Biological process	C21-steroid hormone biosynthetic process; sterol metabolic process; cholesterol metabolic process; generation of precursor metabolites and energy; steroid biosynthetic process; lipid metabolism; steroid metabolic process; ubiquinone biosynthetic process
Sources:Amigo / QuickGO
Orthologs
Databases	NCBI: entry; OMA: entry
Species	Human	Mouse
Entrez	2232	14149
Ensembl	ENSG00000161513	ENSMUSG00000018861
UniProt	P22570	Q61578
RefSeq (mRNA)	NM_001258012; NM_001258013; NM_001258014; NM_001258015; NM_001258016 NM_004110; NM_024417	NM_007997
RefSeq (protein)	NP_001244941; NP_001244942; NP_001244943; NP_001244944; NP_001244945 NP_004101; NP_077728	NP_032023
Location (UCSC)	Chr 17: 74.86 – 74.87 Mb	Chr 11: 115.16 – 115.17 Mb
PubMed search
- Wikidata
View/Edit Human	View/Edit Mouse

Adrenodoxin reductase (Enzyme Nomenclature name: adrenodoxin-NADP+ reductase, EC 1.18.1.6), was first isolated from bovine adrenal cortex where it functions as the first enzyme in the mitochondrial P450 systems that catalyze essential steps in steroid hormone biosynthesis. Examination of complete genome sequences revealed that adrenodoxin reductase gene is present in most metazoans and prokaryotes.

== Nomenclature ==
The name of the enzyme was coined based on its function to reduce a [2Fe-2S] (2 iron, 2 sulfur) electron-transfer protein that was named adrenodoxin. Later, in some studies, the enzyme was also referred to as a "ferredoxin reductase", as adrenodoxin is a ferredoxin. In the human gene nomenclature, the standard name is ferredoxin reductase and the symbol is FDXR, with ADXR specified as a synonym.

The assignment of the name "ferredoxin reductase" has been criticized as a misnomer because determination of the structure of adrenodoxin reductase revealed that it is completely different from that of plant ferredoxin reductase and there is no homology between these two enzymes. With more proteins with a ferroxodin-reducing activity discovered in both families as well as novel families, this enzyme activity is now seen as an example of convergent evolution.

== Function ==
Adrenodoxin reductase is a flavoprotein as it carries a FAD type coenzyme. The enzyme functions as the first electron transfer protein of mitochondrial P450 systems such as P450scc. The FAD coenzyme receives two electrons from NADPH and transfers them one at a time to the electron transfer protein adrenodoxin. Adrenodoxin functions as a mobile shuttle that transfers electrons between ADXR and mitochondrial P450s.

It catalyzes the following reaction:

NADPH + 2 oxidized adrenodoxin —→ 2 reduced adrenodoxin + NADP^{+} + H^{+}

== Gene structure ==
The cDNA for adrenodoxin reductase was first cloned in 1987. In both bovine and human genomes there is only a single copy of the gene.

== Sites of expression ==
ADXR gene is expressed in all tissues that have mitochondrial P450s. The highest levels of the enzyme are found in the adrenal cortex, granulosa cells of the ovary and leydig cells of the testis that specialize in steroid hormone synthesis. Immunofluorescent staining shows that enzyme is localized in mitochondria. The enzyme is also expressed in the liver, the kidney and the placenta.

== Enzyme structure ==
Adrenodoxin reductase has two domains that bind NADPH and FAD separately. The FAD and NADP binding sites of the enzyme were predicted by sequence analysis of the enzyme.

While the FAD-binding site has a consensus sequence (Gly-x-Gly-x-x-Gly) that is similar to other Rossmann folds in FAD and NAD binding sites, the NADPH binding site consensus sequence differs from the FAD-binding site by the substitution of an alanine instead of the last Gly (Gly-x-Gly-x-x-Ala). The location of these FAD and NADP binding sites were confirmed by the crystal structure of the enzyme.
