= Ferredoxin =

Iron–sulfur proteins

Ferredoxins (from Latin ferrum: iron + redox, often abbreviated "fd") are iron–sulfur proteins that mediate electron transfer in a range of metabolic reactions. They contain iron and sulfur atoms organized as iron–sulfur clusters. These biomolecules accept or discharge electrons, with the effect of a change in the oxidation state of the iron atoms between +2 and +3, letting them act as electron transfer agents in biological redox reactions.

The term "ferredoxin" was coined by D.C. Wharton of the DuPont Co. and applied to the "iron protein" first purified in 1962 by Mortenson, Valentine, and Carnahan from the anaerobic bacterium Clostridium pasteurianum.

Other bioinorganic electron transport systems include rubredoxins, cytochromes, blue copper proteins, and the structurally related Rieske proteins.

Another redox protein, isolated from spinach chloroplasts, was termed "chloroplast ferredoxin". The chloroplast ferredoxin is involved in both cyclic and non-cyclic photophosphorylation reactions of photosynthesis. In non-cyclic photophosphorylation, ferredoxin is the last electron acceptor thus reducing the enzyme NADP^{+} reductase. It accepts electrons produced from sunlight-excited chlorophyll and transfers them to the enzyme ferredoxin: NADP^{+} oxidoreductase EC 1.18.1.2.

== Types ==
Ferredoxins can be classified according to the nature of their iron–sulfur clusters and by sequence similarity.

=== Human ===
- 2Fe–2S: AOX1; FDX1; FDX2; NDUFS1; SDHB; XDH;
- 4Fe–4S: ABCE1; DPYD; NDUFS8;

=== Fe_{2}S_{2} ===
2Fe-2S iron-sulfur cluster binding domain
- Structural representation of an Fe_{2}S_{2} ferredoxin.

Identifiers
- Symbol: Fer2
- Pfam: PF00111
- Pfam clan: CL0486
- InterPro: IPR001041
- PROSITE: PDOC00642
- SCOP2: 3fxc / SCOPe / SUPFAM
- OPM protein: 1kf6
Available protein structures:
- PDB: IPR001041 PF00111 (ECOD; PDBsum)
- AlphaFold: IPR001041; PF00111

Members of the 2Fe–2S ferredoxin superfamily (InterPro: IPR036010) have a general core structure consisting of beta(2)-alpha-beta(2), which includes putidaredoxin, terpredoxin, and adrenodoxin. They are proteins of around one hundred amino acids with four conserved cysteine residues to which the 2Fe–2S cluster is ligated. This conserved region is also found as a domain in various metabolic enzymes and in multidomain proteins, such as aldehyde oxidoreductase (N-terminal), xanthine oxidase (N-terminal), phthalate dioxygenase reductase (C-terminal), succinate dehydrogenase iron–sulphur protein (N-terminal), and methane monooxygenase reductase (N-terminal).

==== Plant-type ====
One group of ferredoxins, originally found in chloroplast membranes, has been termed "chloroplast-type" or "plant-type" (InterPro: IPR010241). Its active center is a [Fe_{2}S_{2}] cluster, where the iron atoms are tetrahedrally coordinated both by inorganic sulfur atoms and by sulfurs of four conserved cysteine (Cys) residues.

In chloroplasts, Fe_{2}S_{2} ferredoxins function as electron carriers in the photosynthetic electron transport chain and as electron donors to various cellular proteins, such as glutamate synthase, nitrite reductase, sulfite reductase, and the cyclase of chlorophyll biosynthesis. Since the cyclase is a ferredoxin dependent enzyme this may provide a mechanism for coordination between photosynthesis and the chloroplasts need for chlorophyll by linking chlorophyll biosynthesis to the photosynthetic electron transport chain. In hydroxylating bacterial dioxygenase systems, they serve as intermediate electron-transfer carriers between reductase flavoproteins and oxygenase.

==== Thioredoxin-like ====
The Fe_{2}S_{2} ferredoxin from Clostridium pasteurianum (Cp2FeFd; P07324) has been recognized as distinct protein family on the basis of its amino acid sequence, spectroscopic properties of its iron–sulfur cluster and the unique ligand swapping ability of two cysteine ligands to the [Fe_{2}S_{2}] cluster. Although the physiological role of this ferredoxin remains unclear, a strong and specific interaction of Cp2FeFd with the molybdenum-iron protein of nitrogenase has been revealed. Homologous ferredoxins from Azotobacter vinelandii (Av2FeFdI; P82802) and Aquifex aeolicus (AaFd; O66511) have been characterized. The crystal structure of AaFd has been solved. AaFd exists as a dimer. The structure of AaFd monomer is different from other Fe_{2}S_{2} ferredoxins. The fold belongs to the α+β class, with first four β-strands and two α-helices adopting a variant of the thioredoxin fold. UniProt categorizes these as the "2Fe2S Shethna-type ferredoxin" family.

==== Adrenodoxin-type ====
ferredoxin 1
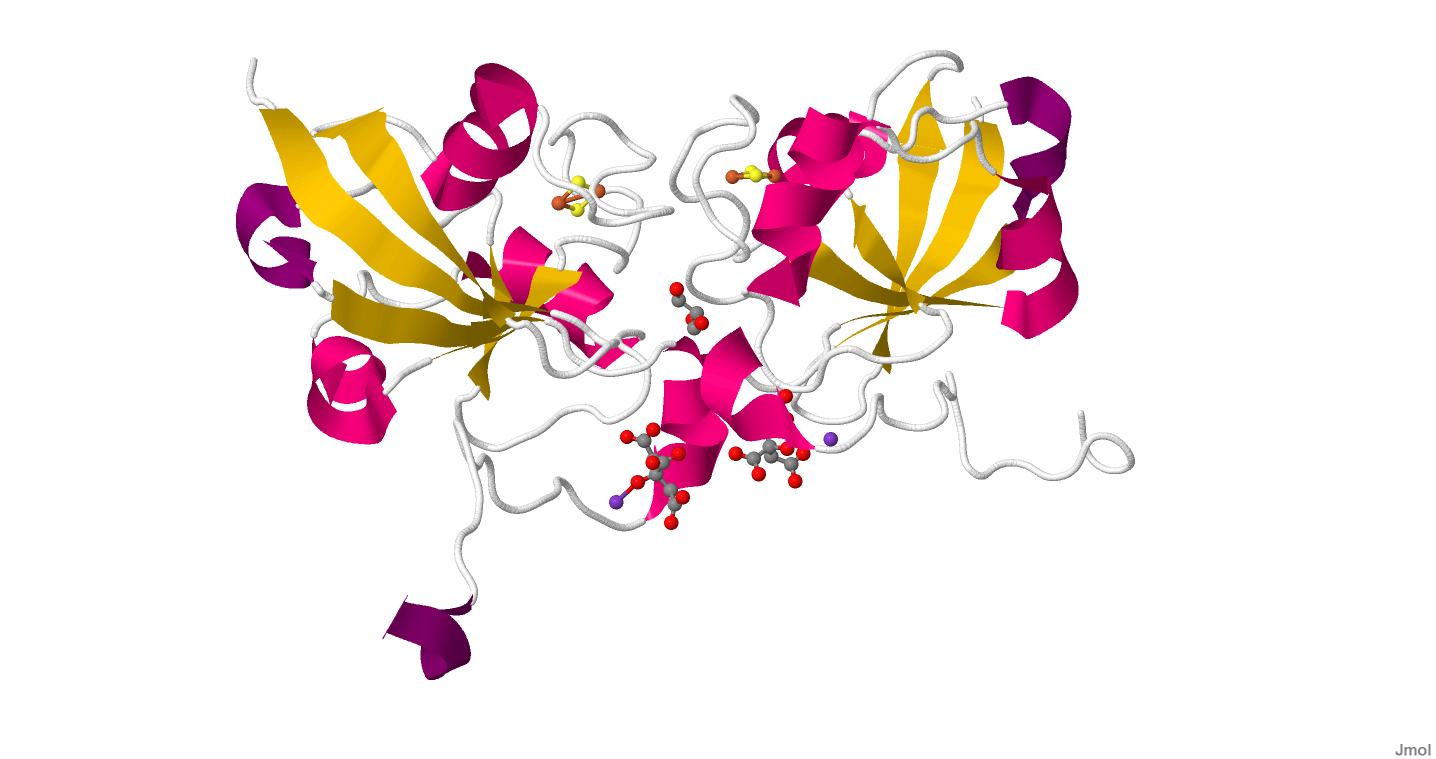
- Crystal structure of human ferredoxin-1 (FDX1).

Identifiers
- Symbol: FDX1
- Alt. symbols: FDX
- NCBI gene: 2230
- HGNC: 3638
- OMIM: 103260
- RefSeq: NM_004109
- UniProt: P10109

Other data
- Locus: Chr. 11 q22.3
Search for
- Structures: Swiss-model
- Domains: InterPro

Adrenodoxin (adrenal ferredoxin; InterPro: IPR001055), putidaredoxin, and terpredoxin make up a family of soluble Fe_{2}S_{2} proteins that act as single electron carriers, mainly found in eukaryotic mitochondria and Pseudomonadota. The human variant of adrenodoxin is referred to as ferredoxin-1 and ferredoxin-2. In mitochondrial monooxygenase systems, adrenodoxin transfers an electron from NADPH:adrenodoxin reductase to membrane-bound cytochrome P450. In bacteria, putidaredoxin and terpredoxin transfer electrons between corresponding NADH-dependent ferredoxin reductases and soluble P450s. The exact functions of other members of this family are not known, although Escherichia coli Fdx is shown to be involved in biogenesis of Fe–S clusters. Despite low sequence similarity between adrenodoxin-type and plant-type ferredoxins, the two classes have a similar folding topology.

Ferredoxin-1 in humans participates in the synthesis of thyroid hormones. It also transfers electrons from adrenodoxin reductase to CYP11A1, a CYP450 enzyme responsible for cholesterol side chain cleavage. FDX-1 has the capability to bind to metals and proteins. Ferredoxin-2 participates in heme A and iron–sulphur protein synthesis.

=== Fe_{4}S_{4} and Fe_{3}S_{4} ===
The [Fe_{4}S_{4}] ferredoxins may be further subdivided into low-potential (bacterial-type) and high-potential (HiPIP) ferredoxins.

Low- and high-potential ferredoxins are related by the following redox scheme:

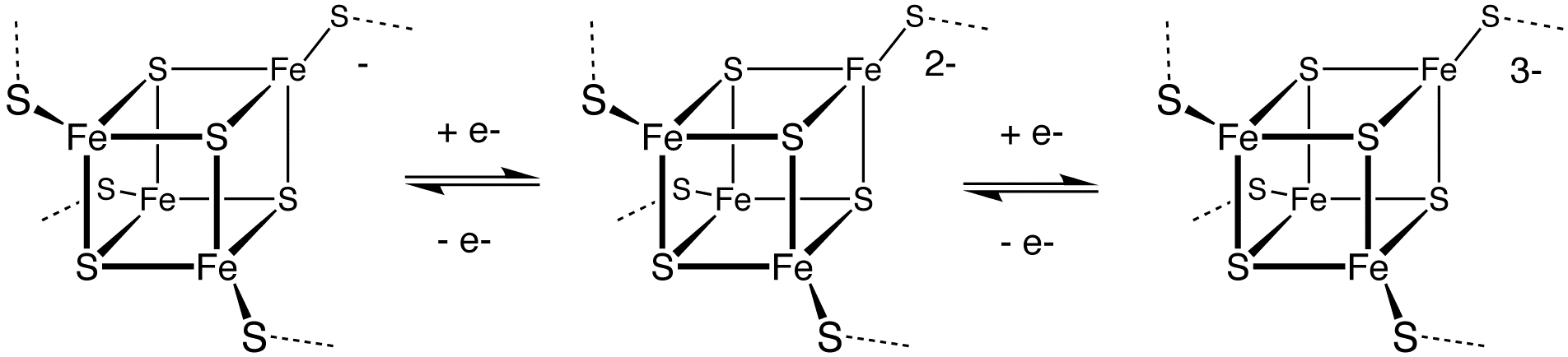

The formal oxidation numbers of the iron ions can be [2Fe^{3+}, 2Fe^{2+}] or [1Fe^{3+}, 3Fe^{2+}] in low-potential ferredoxins. The oxidation numbers of the iron ions in high-potential ferredoxins can be [3Fe^{3+}, 1Fe^{2+}] or [2Fe^{3+}, 2Fe^{2+}].

==== Bacterial-type ====
3Fe-4S binding domain
- Structural representation of an Fe_{3}S_{4} ferredoxin.

Identifiers
- Symbol: Fer4
- Pfam: PF00037
- InterPro: IPR001450
- PROSITE: PDOC00176
- SCOP2: 5fd1 / SCOPe / SUPFAM
- OPM protein: 1kqf
Available protein structures:
- PDB: 1h98A:33-56 1bd6 :33-56 1bweA:33-56 1bqxA:33-56 1bc6 :33-56 7fd1A:33-56 6fd1 :33-56 6fdrA:33-56 1frx :33-56 1gaoB:33-56 1b0tA:33-56 1b0vA:33-56 1fd2 :33-56 1fdd :33-56 1fer :33-56 1axq :33-56 1g6bA:33-56 2fd2 :33-56 1ff2A:33-56 1pc5A:33-56 7fdrA:33-56 1g3oA:33-56 1ftcA:33-56 1frm :33-56 5fd1 :33-56 1a6l :33-56 1frj :33-56 1fdb :33-56 1fri :33-56 1pc4A:33-56 1f5bA:33-56 1frh :33-56 1d3wA:33-56 1frk :33-56 1f5cA:33-56 1frl :33-56 1fda :33-56 1clf :31-54 1durA:28-51 1fca :30-53 1fdn :30-53 2fdn :30-53 1xer :77-100 1h7xA:946-969 1gteA:946-969 1h7wB:946-969 1gthA:946-969 1gt8A:946-969 1gx7A:28-51 1hfeL:28-51 1blu :2-25 1rgvA:2-25 1kqfB:126-149 1kqgB:126-149 1jb0C:4-27 1k0tA:4-27 1rof :3-26 1vjw :3-26 1dwlA:2-25 2pdaA:738-763 1b0pA:738-763 1kekA:738-763 1c4cA:183-206 1c4aA:183-206 1fehA:183-206 1l0vN:142-165 1kfyN:142-165 1kf6B:142-165 1jnrB:40-63 1jnzB:40-63 IPR001450 PF00037 (ECOD; PDBsum)
- AlphaFold: IPR001450; PF00037

A group of Fe_{4}S_{4} ferredoxins, originally found in bacteria, has been termed "bacterial-type". Bacterial-type ferredoxins may in turn be subdivided into groups, based on their sequence properties. Most contain at least one conserved domain, including four cysteine residues that bind to a [Fe_{4}S_{4}] cluster. In Pyrococcus furiosus Fe_{4}S_{4} ferredoxin, one of the conserved Cys residues is substituted with an aspartate residue.

During the evolution of bacterial-type ferredoxins, intrasequence gene duplication, transposition and fusion events occurred, resulting in the appearance of proteins with multiple iron–sulfur centers. In some bacterial ferredoxins, one of the duplicated domains has lost one or more of the four conserved Cys residues. These domains have either lost their iron–sulfur binding property or bind to a [Fe_{3}S_{4}] cluster instead of a [Fe_{4}S_{4}] cluster and dicluster-type.

3-D structures are known for a number of monocluster and dicluster bacterial-type ferredoxins. The fold belongs to the α+β class, with 2-7 α-helices and four β-strands forming a barrel-like structure, and an extruded loop containing three "proximal" Cys ligands of the iron–sulfur cluster.

==== High-potential iron–sulfur proteins ====
High potential iron–sulfur proteins (HiPIPs) form a distinct family of Fe_{4}S_{4} ferredoxins that function in anaerobic electron transport chains. Some HiPIPs have a redox potential higher than any other known iron–sulfur protein (e.g., HiPIP from Rhodopila globiformis has a redox potential of ca. -450 mV). Several HiPIPs have so far been characterized structurally, their folds belonging to the α+β class. As in other bacterial ferredoxins, the [Fe_{4}S_{4}] unit forms a cubane-type cluster and is ligated to the protein via four Cys residues.

== Reduction bioenergetics ==
Ferredoxins typically carry out a single electron transfer.

Fd_{ox}^{0} + e^{−} ⇌ Fd_{red}^{−}

However, a few bacterial ferredoxins (of the 2[4Fe4S] type) have two iron sulfur clusters and can carry out two electron transfer reactions. Depending on the sequence of the protein, the two transfers can have nearly identical reduction potentials or they may differ significantly.

Fd_{ox}^{0} + e^{−} ⇌ Fd_{red}^{−}

Fd_{red}^{−} + e^{−} ⇌ Fd_{red}^{2−}

Ferredoxins are one of the most reducing biological electron carriers. They typically have a mid point potential of -420 mV. The reduction potential of a substance in the cell will differ from its midpoint potential depending on the concentrations of its reduced and oxidized forms. For a one electron reaction, the potential changes by around 60 mV for each power of ten change in the ratio of the concentration. For example, if the ferredoxin pool is around 95% reduced, the reduction potential will be around -500 mV. In comparison, other biological reactions mostly have less reducing potentials. For example, the primary biosynthetic reductant of the cell, NADPH, has a cellular redox potential of -370 mV (E_{0} = -320 mV).

Depending on the sequence of the supporting protein, ferredoxins have reduction potential from around -500 mV to -340 mV. Organisms typically host multiple types of ferredoxins.

Some ferrodoxins are called "highly reducing".

=== Direct ===
Reactions of Fd can be coupled to the oxidation of aldehydes to acids. Examples are the glyceraldehyde to glycerate reaction (-580 mV), the carbon monoxide dehydrogenase reaction (-520 mV), and the 2-oxoacid:Fd Oxidoreductase reactions (-500 mV) like the reaction carried out by pyruvate synthase.

=== Membrane potential coupled ===
Ferredoxin can also be reduced by using NADH (-320 mV) or H_{2} (-414 mV), but these processes are coupled to the consumption of the membrane potential to power the "boosting" of electrons to the higher energy state. The Rnf complex is a widespread membrane protein in bacteria that reversibly transfers electrons between NADH and ferredoxin while pumping Na^{+} or H^{+} ions across the cell membrane. The chemiosmotic potential of the membrane is consumed to power the unfavorable reduction of Fd_{ox} by NADH. This reaction is an essential source of Fd^{−}_{red} in many autotrophic organisms. If the cell is growing on substrates that provide excess Fd^{−}_{red}, the Rnf complex can transfer these electrons to NAD^{+} and store the resultant energy in the membrane potential. The energy converting hydrogenases (Ech) are a family of enzymes that reversibly couple the transfer of electrons between Fd and H_{2} while pumping H^{+} ions across the membrane to balance the energy difference.

Fd^{0}_{ox} + NADH + Na^{+}_{outside} $\ce{<=>}$ Fd^{2−}_{red} + NAD^{+} + Na^{+}_{inside}

Fd^{0}_{ox} + H_{2} + H^{+}_{outside} $\ce{<=>}$ Fd^{2−}_{red} + H^{+} + H^{+}_{inside}

=== Electron bifurcation ===
The unfavourable reduction of Fd from a less reducing electron donor can be coupled simultaneously with the favourable reduction of an oxidizing agent through an electron bifurcation reaction. An example of the electron bifurcation reaction is the generation of Fd^{−}_{red} for nitrogen fixation in certain aerobic diazotrophs. Typically, in oxidative phosphorylation the transfer of electrons from NADH to ubiquinone (Q) is coupled to charging the proton motive force. In Azotobacter the energy released by transferring one electron from NADH to Q is used to simultaneously boost the transfer of one electron from NADH to Fd.

=== High potential ===
Some ferredoxins have a sufficiently high redox potential that they can be directly reduced by NADPH. One such ferredoxin is adrenoxin (-274 mV) which takes part in the biosynthesis of many mammalian steroids. The ferredoxin Fd3 in the roots of plants that reduces nitrate and sulfite has a midpoint potential of -337 mV and is also reduced by NADPH.
