= Adrenal ferredoxin =

Mammalian protein found in Homo sapiens

FDX1

Identifiers
- Aliases: FDX1, ADX, FDX, LOH11CR1D, ferredoxin 1
- External IDs: OMIM: 103260; MGI: 103224; GeneCards: FDX1
Available structures
PDB	Ortholog search: PDBe RCSB
PDB	List of PDB id codes 3N9Y, 3N9Z, 3NA0, 3NA1, 3P1M

Gene location (Human)
Chr.	Chromosome 11 (human)
Band	11q22.3	Start	110,429,948 bp
Band	11q22.3	End	110,464,884 bp

Gene location (Mouse)
Chr.	Chromosome 9 (mouse)
Band	9|9 A5.3	Start	51,854,606 bp
Band	9|9 A5.3	End	51,874,856 bp
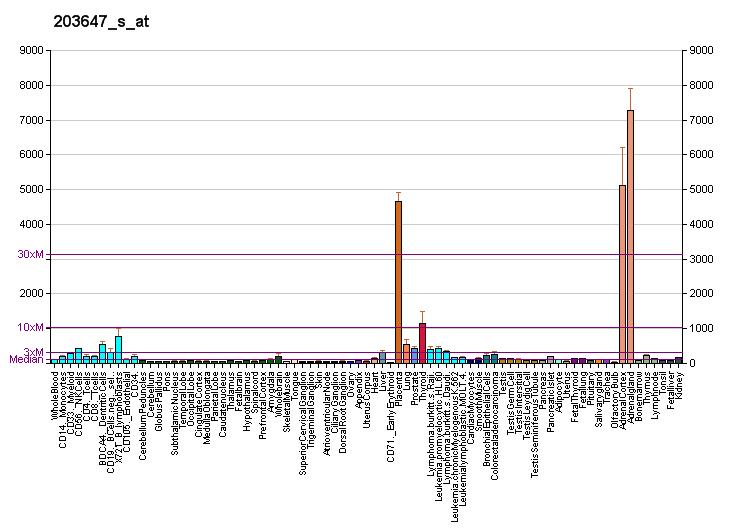

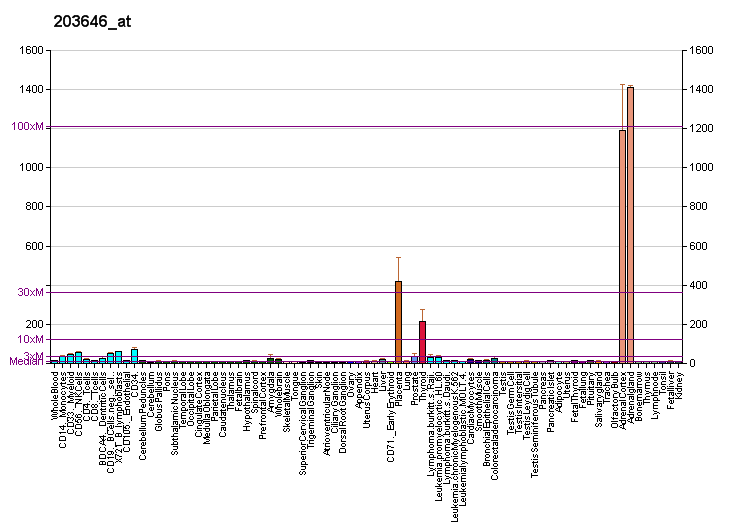
RNA expression pattern
Bgee	Human / Mouse (ortholog); Top expressed in: right adrenal cortex; left adrenal gland; left adrenal cortex; seminal vesicula; kidney tubule; jejunal mucosa; amniotic fluid; right ventricle; mucosa of sigmoid colon; parotid gland / Top expressed in: adrenal gland; Ileal epithelium; left lobe of liver; Gonadal ridge; interventricular septum; Paneth cell; cardiac muscle tissue of left ventricle; transitional epithelium of urinary bladder; brown adipose tissue; vastus lateralis muscle; More reference expression data
BioGPS	More reference expression data
Gene ontology
Molecular function	iron ion binding; electron transfer activity; iron-sulfur cluster binding; metal ion binding; 2 iron, 2 sulfur cluster binding
Cellular component	mitochondrion; mitochondrial matrix
Biological process	C21-steroid hormone biosynthetic process; sterol metabolic process; cholesterol metabolic process; small molecule metabolic process; hormone biosynthetic process; lipid metabolism; steroid biosynthetic process; steroid metabolic process; cellular response to cAMP; cellular response to forskolin; electron transport chain
Sources:Amigo / QuickGO
Orthologs
Databases	NCBI: entry; OMA: entry
Species	Human	Mouse
Entrez	2230	14148
Ensembl	ENSG00000137714	ENSMUSG00000032051
UniProt	P10109	P46656
RefSeq (mRNA)	NM_004109	NM_001301728; NM_007996
RefSeq (protein)	NP_004100	NP_001288657; NP_032022
Location (UCSC)	Chr 11: 110.43 – 110.46 Mb	Chr 9: 51.85 – 51.87 Mb
PubMed search
- Wikidata
View/Edit Human	View/Edit Mouse

Adrenal ferredoxin (also adrenodoxin (ADX), adrenodoxin, mitochondrial, hepatoredoxin, ferredoxin-1 (FDX1)) is a protein that in humans is encoded by the FDX1 gene. In addition to the expressed gene at this chromosomal locus (11q22), there are pseudogenes located on chromosomes 20 and 21.

== Function ==
Adrenodoxin is a small iron-sulfur protein that can accept and carry a single electron. Adrenodoxin functions as an electron transfer protein in the mitochondrial cytochrome P450 systems. The first enzyme in this system is adrenodoxin reductase that carries an FAD. FAD can be reduced by two electrons donated from coenzyme NADPH. These two electrons are transferred one a time to adrenodoxin. Adrenodoxin in return reduces mitochondrial cytochrome P450. This particular oxidation/reduction system is involved in the synthesis of steroid hormones in steroidogenic tissues. In addition, similar systems also function in vitamin D and bile acid synthesis in the kidney and liver respectively. Adrenodoxin has been identified in a number of different tissues but all forms have been shown to be identical and are not tissue specific.
