= Flavoprotein =

Protein family

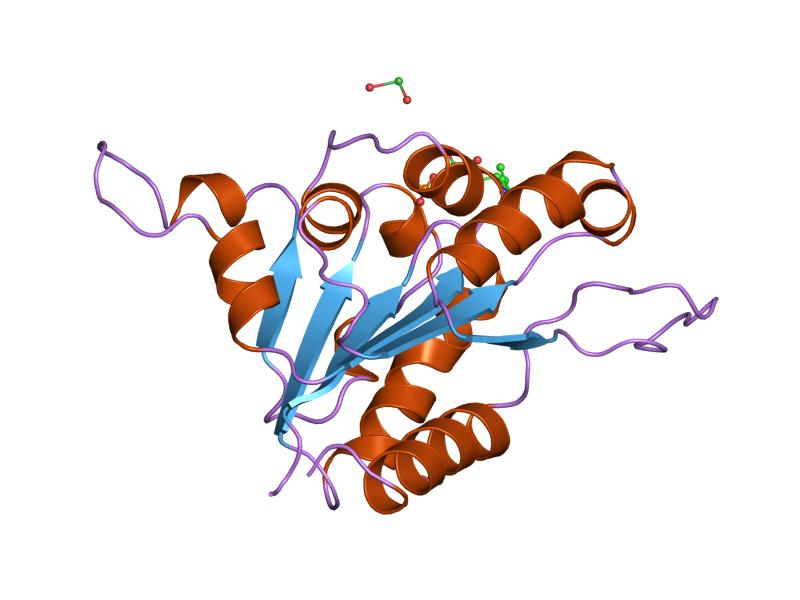
- the fmn binding protein athal3

Identifiers
- Symbol: Flavoprotein
- Pfam: PF02441
- InterPro: IPR003382
- SCOP2: 1e20 / SCOPe / SUPFAM
Available protein structures:
- PDB: IPR003382 PF02441 (ECOD; PDBsum)
- AlphaFold: IPR003382; PF02441

Flavoproteins are proteins that contain a nucleic acid derivative of riboflavin. These proteins are involved in a wide array of biological processes, including removal of radicals contributing to oxidative stress, photosynthesis, and DNA repair. The flavoproteins are some of the most-studied families of enzymes.

Flavoproteins have either FMN (flavin mononucleotide) or FAD (flavin adenine dinucleotide) as a prosthetic group or as a cofactor. The flavin is generally tightly bound (as in adrenodoxin reductase, wherein the FAD is buried deeply). About 5-10% of flavoproteins have a covalently linked FAD. Based on the available structural data, FAD-binding sites can be divided into more than 200 different types.

90 flavoproteins are encoded in the human genome; about 84% require FAD and around 16% require FMN, whereas 5 proteins require both. Flavoproteins are mainly located in the mitochondria. Of all flavoproteins, 90% perform redox reactions and the other 10% are transferases, lyases, isomerases, ligases.

== Discovery ==
Flavoproteins were first mentioned in 1879, when they isolated as a bright-yellow pigment from cow's milk. They were initially termed lactochrome. By the early 1930s, this same pigment had been isolated from a range of sources, and recognised as a component of the vitamin B complex. Its structure was determined and reported in 1935 and given the name riboflavin, derived from the ribityl side chain and yellow colour of the conjugated ring system.

The first evidence for the requirement of flavin as an enzyme cofactor came in 1935. Hugo Theorell and coworkers showed that a bright-yellow-coloured yeast protein, identified previously as essential for cellular respiration, could be separated into apoprotein and a bright-yellow pigment. Neither apoprotein nor pigment alone could catalyse the oxidation of NADH, but mixing of the two restored the enzyme activity. However, replacing the isolated pigment with riboflavin did not restore enzyme activity, despite being indistinguishable under spectroscopy. This led to the discovery that the protein studied required not riboflavin but flavin mononucleotide to be catalytically active.

Similar experiments with D-amino acid oxidase led to the identification of flavin adenine dinucleotide (FAD) as a second form of flavin utilised by enzymes.

== Examples ==
The flavoprotein family contains a diverse range of enzymes, including:

- Adrenodoxin reductase that is involved in steroid hormone synthesis in vertebrate species, and has a ubiquitous distribution in metazoa and prokaryotes
- Cytochrome P450 reductase that is a redox partner of cytochrome P450 proteins located in endoplasmic reticulum
- Epidermin biosynthesis protein, EpiD, which has been shown to be a flavoprotein that binds FMN. This enzyme catalyses the removal of two reducing equivalents from the cysteine residue of the C-terminal meso-lanthionine of epidermin to form a --C==C-- double bond
- The B chain of dipicolinate synthase, an enzyme which catalyses the formation of dipicolinic acid from dihydroxydipicolinic acid
- Phenylacrylic acid decarboxylase (EC 4.1.1.102), an enzyme which confers resistance to cinnamic acid in yeast
- Phototropin and cryptochrome, light-sensing proteins
- Flavodiirion Proteins, enzymes which also possess an diiron site and catalyze redox reactions in oxidative stress defence
