= Prokaryotic riboflavin biosynthesis protein =

Class of enzymes

FAD synthetase
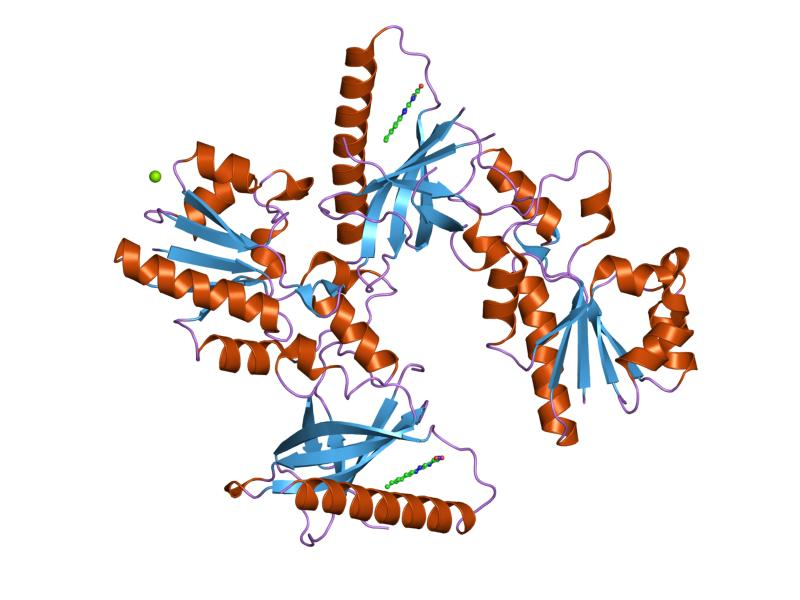
- crystal structure of flavin binding to fad synthetase from thermotoga maritina

Identifiers
- Symbol: FAD_syn
- Pfam: PF06574
- Pfam clan: CL0119
- InterPro: IPR015864
- SCOP2: 1n05 / SCOPe / SUPFAM
Available protein structures:
- PDB: IPR015864 PF06574 (ECOD; PDBsum)
- AlphaFold: IPR015864; PF06574

The prokaryotic riboflavin biosynthesis protein is a bifunctional enzyme found in bacteria that catalyzes the phosphorylation of riboflavin into flavin mononucleotide (FMN) and the adenylylation of FMN into flavin adenine dinucleotide (FAD). It consists of a C-terminal riboflavin kinase and an N-terminal FMN-adenylyltransferase. This bacterial protein is functionally similar to the monofunctional riboflavin kinases and FMN-adenylyltransferases of eukaryotic organisms, but only the riboflavin kinases are structurally homologous.

== Structure ==
Prokaryotic riboflavin biosynthesis proteins are also known as the prokaryotic type-I FAD synthetases, which consist of a C-terminal riboflavin kinase (RFK) and an N-terminal FMN-adenylyltransferase (FMNAT). The globular RFK consists of six antiparallel β-sheets that form a β-barrel, and an α-helix adjacent to this structure. The barrel and helix are held together by 7 independent loops. The FMNAT module contains an α/β dinucleotide binding domain within the active site, which it uses to bind to the substrate. The overall structure is held together by 5 parallel β-sheets that are adjacent to 4 α-helices, with 2 being long and 2 being short. A subdomain, containing 2 smaller α-helices, encompasses the area that connects to the C-terminal RFK module.

== Mechanism ==
Riboflavin is converted into catalytically active cofactors FAD and FMN by the actions of riboflavin kinase EC 2.7.1.26, which converts it into FMN, and FAD synthetase EC 2.7.7.2, which adenylates FMN to FAD. The RFK module phosphorylates the riboflavin substrate and converts it into FMN, which is then released from the module. This reaction is dependent on an ATP molecule stabilized by an Mg^{2+} ion, which causes only a single phosphate group to leave the ATP and bond to riboflavin. The released FMN then joins to the N-terminal FMNAT module and is adenylated, with the adenylyl group of ATP attaching to the phosphate group on FMN and the diphosphate group leaving.

ATP + riboflavin ⇌ ADP + FMN

ATP + FMN ⇌ diphosphate + FAD

== Phylogenetic Domain Comparison ==
Eukaryotes usually have two separate enzymes, while most prokaryotes have a single bifunctional protein that can carry out both catalyses, although exceptions occur in both cases. While eukaryotic monofunctional RFK is orthologous to the bifunctional prokaryotic RFK module, the monofunctional FMNAT differs from its prokaryotic counterpart, and is instead related to the PAPS-reductase family. The bacterial FMNAT module of the bifunctional enzyme has remote similarity to eukaryotic nucleotidyltransferases and, hence, it may be involved in the adenylylation reaction of FAD synthetases.
