= Fad (disambiguation) =

A fad is a practice or interest followed for a time with exaggerated zeal.

Fad or FAD may also refer to:

- Familial Alzheimer disease, a neurodegenerative medical condition
- Flavin adenine dinucleotide, a redox cofactor chemical compound
- Fad Browne (1906–1991), Irish politician
- First appearance datum, the date of the oldest known fossil of a living species
- Fish aggregating device, a man-made object used for fishing in pelagic zones
- Flying Ant Day, a period of increased perception of the nuptial flight for ants prompted by changes in weather
- Wagi language of Papua New Guinea, ISO 639-3 code
- Food availability decline, a theory of famine
- Fusil Automático Doble, a rifle used by the Peruvian Army

== See also ==
- FADD
- Fads (disambiguation)
