= 3-hydroxy-2-methylpyridinecarboxylate dioxygenase =

Class of enzymes

Identifiers
- EC no.: 1.14.12.4
- CAS no.: 37256-69-2

Databases
- BRENDA: enzyme data
- ExPASy: NiceZyme view
- KEGG: enzyme entry
- MetaCyc: metabolic pathway
- Rhea: reactions
- PDB structures: RCSB PDB PDBe PDBsum
- Gene Ontology: AmiGO / QuickGO
Search
- PMC: articles
- PubMed: articles
- NCBI: proteins

In enzymology, a 3-hydroxy-2-methylpyridinecarboxylate dioxygenase (EC 1.14.12.4) is an enzyme that catalyzes the chemical reaction

3-hydroxy-2-methylpyridine-5-carboxylate + NAD(P)H + H^{+} + O_{2} $\rightleftharpoons$ 2-(acetamidomethylene)succinate + NAD(P)+

The 5 substrates of this enzyme are 3-hydroxy-2-methylpyridine-5-carboxylate, NADH, NADPH, H^{+}, and O_{2}, whereas its 3 products are 2-(acetamidomethylene)succinate, NAD^{+}, and NADP^{+}.

This enzyme belongs to the family of oxidoreductases, specifically those acting on paired donors, with O_{2} as oxidant and incorporation or reduction of oxygen. The oxygen incorporated need not be derived from O_{2} with NADH or NADPH as one donor, and incorporation of two atoms of oxygen into the other donor. The systematic name of this enzyme class is 3-hydroxy-2-methylpyridine-5-carboxylate,NAD(P)H:oxygen oxidoreductase (decyclizing). Other names in common use include methylhydroxypyridinecarboxylate oxidase, 2-methyl-3-hydroxypyridine 5-carboxylic acid dioxygenase, methylhydroxypyridine carboxylate dioxygenase, and 3-hydroxy-3-methylpyridinecarboxylate dioxygenase [incorrect]. This enzyme participates in vitamin B_{6} metabolism. It employs one cofactor, FAD.
