= Pyruvate oxidase (CoA-acetylating) =

pyruvate oxidase (CoA-acetylating)

Identifiers
- EC no.: 1.2.3.6
- CAS no.: 62213-57-4

Databases
- BRENDA: enzyme data
- ExPASy: NiceZyme view
- KEGG: enzyme entry
- MetaCyc: metabolic pathway
- Rhea: reactions
- PDB structures: RCSB PDB PDBe PDBsum
- Gene Ontology: AmiGO / QuickGO
Search
- PMC: articles
- PubMed: articles
- NCBI: proteins

In enzymology, pyruvate oxidase (CoA-acetylating) (EC 1.2.3.6) is an enzyme that catalyzes the chemical reaction

pyruvic acid
+ coenzyme A
O_{2}
H_{2}O_{2}
O_{2}
H_{2}O_{2}
acetyl-CoA
+ CO_{2}

The three substrates of this enzyme are pyruvic acid, coenzyme A, and oxygen. Its products are acetyl-CoA, carbon dioxide, and hydrogen peroxide.

This enzyme belongs to the family of oxidoreductases, specifically those acting on the aldehyde or oxo group of donor with oxygen as acceptor. The systematic name of this enzyme class is pyruvate:oxygen 2 - oxidoreductase (CoA-acetylating). This enzyme participates in pyruvate metabolism. It employs one cofactor, flavin adenine dinucleotide.
