= CTP-dependent riboflavin kinase =

Enzyme

Identifiers
- EC no.: 2.7.1.161

Databases
- IntEnz: IntEnz view
- BRENDA: BRENDA entry
- ExPASy: NiceZyme view
- KEGG: KEGG entry
- MetaCyc: metabolic pathway
- PRIAM: profile
- PDB structures: RCSB PDB PDBe PDBsum
Search
- PMC: articles
- PubMed: articles
- NCBI: proteins

CTP-dependent riboflavin kinase (EC 2.7.1.161, Methanocaldococcus jannaschii Mj0056, Mj0056) is an enzyme with systematic name CTP:riboflavin 5′-phosphotransferase. This enzyme catalyses the following chemical reaction

CTP +
riboflavin
CDP +
flavin mononucleotide

The enzyme characterised from Methanocaldococcus jannaschii converts riboflavin to flavin mononucleotide by transferring a phosphate group from the cofactor, cytidine triphosphate (CTP), which is converted to cytidine diphosphate (CDP).

This archaeal enzyme uses CTP as the donor nucleotide, rather than adenosine triphosphate as used in many species that contain the enzyme riboflavin kinase.
