= Cob(II)alamin reductase =

cob(II)alamin reductase

Identifiers
- EC no.: 1.16.1.4
- CAS no.: 37256-40-9

Databases
- BRENDA: enzyme data
- ExPASy: NiceZyme view
- KEGG: enzyme entry
- MetaCyc: metabolic pathway
- Rhea: reactions
- PDB structures: RCSB PDB PDBe PDBsum
- Gene Ontology: AmiGO / QuickGO
Search
- PMC: articles
- PubMed: articles
- NCBI: proteins

In enzymology, a cob(II)alamin reductase (EC 1.16.1.4) is an enzyme that catalyzes the chemical reaction

2 cob(I)alamin + NAD^{+} $\rightleftharpoons$ 2 cob(II)alamin + NADH + H^{+}

Thus, the two substrates of this enzyme are cob(I)alamin and NAD^{+}, whereas its 3 products are cob(II)alamin, NADH, and H^{+}.

This enzyme belongs to the family of oxidoreductases, specifically those oxidizing metal ion with NAD+ or NADP+ as acceptor. The systematic name of this enzyme class is cob(I)alamin:NAD+ oxidoreductase. Other names in common use include vitamin B12r reductase, B12r reductase, and NADH2:cob(II)alamin oxidoreductase. This enzyme participates in porphyrin and chlorophyll metabolism. It employs one cofactor, FAD.
