= (S)-6-hydroxynicotine oxidase =

Class of enzymes

S-6-hydroxynicotine oxidase

Identifiers
- EC no.: 1.5.3.5
- CAS no.: 37256-29-4

Databases
- BRENDA: enzyme data
- ExPASy: NiceZyme view
- KEGG: enzyme entry
- MetaCyc: metabolic pathway
- Rhea: reactions
- PDB structures: RCSB PDB PDBe PDBsum
- Gene Ontology: AmiGO / QuickGO
Search
- PMC: articles
- PubMed: articles
- NCBI: proteins

In enzymology, a (S)-6-hydroxynicotine oxidase (EC 1.5.3.5) is an enzyme that catalyzes the chemical reaction

(S)-6-hydroxynicotine + H_{2}O + O_{2} $\rightleftharpoons$ 1-(6-hydroxypyridin-3-yl)-4-(methylamino)butan-1-one + H_{2}O_{2}

The 3 substrates of this enzyme are (S)-6-hydroxynicotine, H_{2}O, and O_{2}, whereas its two products are 1-(6-hydroxypyridin-3-yl)-4-(methylamino)butan-1-one and H_{2}O_{2}.

This enzyme belongs to the family of oxidoreductases, specifically those acting on the CH-NH group of donors with oxygen as acceptor. The systematic name of this enzyme class is (S)-6-hydroxynicotine:oxygen oxidoreductase. Other names in common use include L-6-hydroxynicotine oxidase, 6-hydroxy-L-nicotine oxidase, and 6-hydroxy-L-nicotine:oxygen oxidoreductase. It employs one cofactor, FAD.
