= Galactoflavin =

Names
- IUPAC name 7,8-Dimethyl-10-[(2S,3R,4S,5R)-2,3,4,5,6-pentahydroxyhexyl]benzo[g]pteridine-2,4-dione

Identifiers
| CAS Number | 5735-19-3 |
| 3D model (JSmol) | Interactive image |
| ChemSpider | 16736134 |
| PubChem CID | 12310019 |
| UNII | Y30ZN232IC |
- InChI: InChI=1S/C18H22N4O7/c1-7-3-9-10(4-8(7)2)22(5-11(24)14(26)15(27)12(25)6-23)16-13(19-9)17(28)21-18(29)20-16/h3-4,11-12,14-15,23-27H,5-6H2,1-2H3,(H,21,28,29)/t11-,12+,14+,15-/m0/s1 Key: RPADDAUXKBBASM-MXYBEHONSA-N
- SMILES: CC1=CC2=C(C=C1C)N(C3=NC(=O)NC(=O)C3=N2)C[C@@H]([C@H]([C@H]([C@@H](CO)O)O)O)O

Properties
| Chemical formula | C_{18}H_{22}N_{4}O_{7} |
| Molar mass | 406.395 g·mol^{−1} |
| Appearance | Yellow solid |
| Melting point | 260 °C (500 °F; 533 K) (dec) |
- Except where otherwise noted, data are given for materials in their standard state (at 25 °C [77 °F], 100 kPa). Infobox references

Galactoflavin is a synthetic compound and riboflavin (vitamin B_{2}) antagonist and antimetabolite. It is a biochemical tool used primarily in research to induce riboflavin deficiency in animal models and humans. It is structurally similar to riboflavin, where the ribose-derived side chain is replaced by a galactose-derived group.

== Chemical properties ==
Galactoflavin's chemical formula is C_{18}H_{22}N_{4}O_{7} and has a molecular weight of 406.40 g/mol. Galactoflavin appears as yellow crystals that decompose at 260 °C and exhibit absorption maxima at 223, 267, 370, and 445 nm. It displays yellow-green fluorescence in water.

== Biological activity ==
As a riboflavin analog, galactoflavin competes with riboflavin in metabolic pathways, leading to depletion of riboflavin-containing coenzymes such as flavin mononucleotide (FMN) and flavin adenine dinucleotide (FAD) in tissues such as liver and kidney. This antagonism results in riboflavin deficiency symptoms that are reversible with excess riboflavin supplementation. In rats, galactoflavin feeding reduces flavin content in mitochondria and affects oxidative phosphorylation.

The antiriboflavin effect of galactoflavin was first demonstrated in 1945 and was found to produce riboflavin deficiency in rats reversible by excess riboflavin.

In humans, galactoflavin rapidly induces riboflavin deficiency, with clinical signs including anemia, glossitis, angular stomatitis, and dermatitis appearing within weeks.

== Research uses ==
Galactoflavin has been employed to study the effects of riboflavin deficiency on growth, enzyme activity, and congenital malformations. In pregnant rats, it induces multiple congenital abnormalities in embryos, including cardiovascular defects and hydrocephalus, by disrupting terminal electron transport systems. It has also been investigated for potential antitumor effects due to its ability to cause regression of tumors in rodents through riboflavin deficiency.

In mice, dietary galactoflavin affects hepatocyte ultrastructure. It impairs adrenal ascorbic acid response to stress in rats.
