= Fads (disambiguation) =

Fads is plural for fad, a practice or interest followed for a time with exaggerated zeal.

Fads or FADS may also refer to:

- FMN adenylyltransferase
- FADS (candy), an Australian candy cigarette
- The FADS gene locus, containing the genes FADS1 and FADS2, which respectively encode the enzymes FADS1 and FADS2

== See also ==
- Fad (disambiguation)
