= Streptomyces violascens =

Scientific classification
- Domain: Bacteria
- Kingdom: Bacillati
- Phylum: Actinomycetota
- Class: Actinomycetes
- Order: Streptomycetales
- Family: Streptomycetaceae
- Genus: Streptomyces
- Species: S. violascens

Binomial name
- Streptomyces violascens Pridham et al. 1958

Type strain
- ATCC 23968, BCRC 12240, CBS 266.66, CBS 951.68, CCRC 12240, CECT 3215, CGMCC 4.1923, DSM 40183, DSMZ 40183, IFO 12920, IMET 42061, INA 3959/54, ISP 5183, JCM 4424, KCC S-0424, KCCM 40103, KCCS-0424, KCTC 9785, NBRC 12920, NCIB 9820, NCIMB 9820, NRRL B-2700, NRRL-ISP 5183, RIA 1138, VKM Ac-1275

Synonyms
- Actinomyces violascens

Species of bacterium

Streptomyces violascens is a bacterium species from the genus of Streptomyces which has been isolated from soil. Streptomyces violascens produces violapyrone A – G, L-glutamate oxidase and albaflavenoid.

== See also ==
- List of Streptomyces species
