= Riboflavin synthase =

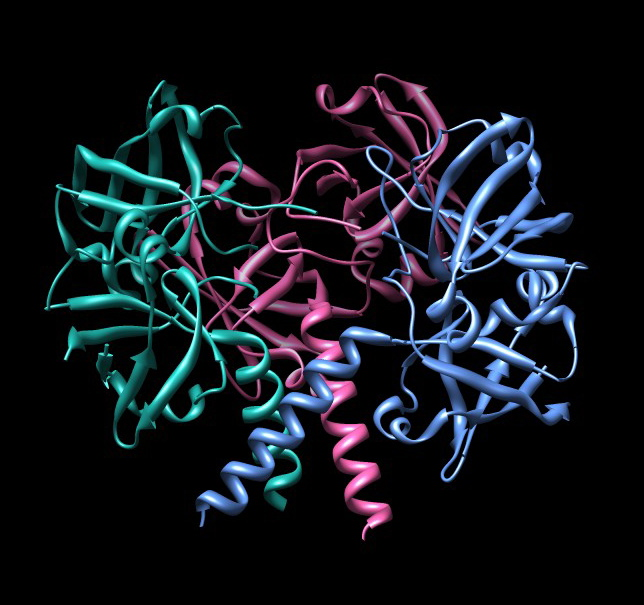
- Crystallographic structure of E. coli riboflavin synthase.

Identifiers
- EC no.: 2.5.1.9
- CAS no.: 9075-82-5

Databases
- IntEnz: IntEnz view
- BRENDA: BRENDA entry
- ExPASy: NiceZyme view
- KEGG: KEGG entry
- MetaCyc: metabolic pathway
- PRIAM: profile
- PDB structures: RCSB PDB PDBe PDBsum
- Gene Ontology: AmiGO / QuickGO
Search
- PMC: articles
- PubMed: articles
- NCBI: proteins

6,7-dimethyl-8-ribityllumazine synthase
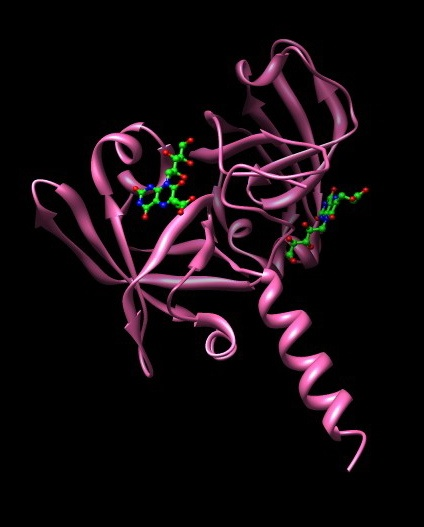
- Riboflavin synthase from S. pombe bound to carboxyethyllumazine.

Identifiers
- Symbol: DMRL_synthase
- Pfam: PF00885
- InterPro: IPR002180
- SCOP2: 1rvv / SCOPe / SUPFAM
Available protein structures:
- PDB: 1c2y, 1c41, 1di0, 1ejb, 1hqk, 1kyv, 1kyx, 1kyy, 1kz1, 1kz4, 1kz6, 1kz9, 1nqu, 1nqv, 1nqw, 1nqx, 1rvv, 1t13, 1w19, 1w29, 1xn1, 1zis, 2a57, 2a58, 2a59, 2c92, 2c94, 2c97, 2c9b, 2c9d, 2f59, 2i0f, 2o6h, 2obx, 2vi5 IPR002180 PF00885 (ECOD; PDBsum)
- AlphaFold: IPR002180; PF00885

Riboflavin synthase is an enzyme that catalyzes the final reaction of riboflavin biosynthesis. It catalyzes the transfer of a four-carbon unit from one molecule of 6,7-dimethyl-8-ribityllumazine onto another, resulting in the synthesis of riboflavin and 5-amino-6-ribitylamino-uracil:

(2) 6,7-dimethyl-8-ribityllumazine → riboflavin + 5-amino-6-ribitylamino-uracil

== Structure ==
The riboflavin synthase monomer has a molecular weight of about 23 kDa. Each monomer contains two beta barrels and one α-helix at the C-terminus (residues 186-206). The monomer folds into pseudo two-fold symmetry, predicted by sequence similarity between the N-terminus barrel (residues 4-86) and the C-terminus barrel (residues 101-184). The interface between these barrels of two different subunits is the location of the active site. The enzyme from different species adopts different quaternary structures, containing up to 120 subunits.

Archeal riboflavin synthase forms as a homopentamer, whereas eubacterial, fungal and plant riboflavin synthase exists as a homotrimer. Their sequences are entirely unrelated, the archeal enzyme is paralogous to 6,7-dimethyl-8-ribityllumazine synthase. The reactions catalyzed by these two types of riboflavin synthase proceed via "enantiomeric" intermediates.

== Active site ==
Two 6,7-dimethyl-8-ribityllumazine (synthesized by lumazine synthase) molecules are hydrogen bound to each monomer as the two domains are topologically similar. The active site is located in the interface of the substrates between monomer pairs and modeled structures of the active site dimer have been created. Only one of the active sites of the enzyme catalyze riboflavin formation at a time as the other two sites face outward and are exposed to solvent. The amino acid residues involved in hydrogen bonding to the ligand are pictured, participating residues may include Thr148, Met160, Ile162, Thr165, Val6, Tyr164, Ser146, and Gly96 at the C-terminal domain and Ser41, Thr50, Gly 62, Ala64, Ser64, Val103, Cys48, His102 at the N-terminal domain.

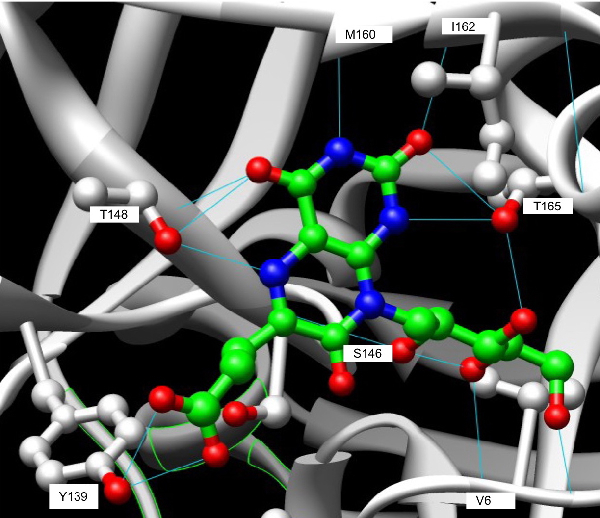
Hydrogen bonding between substrate and enzyme at the C-terminal domain.

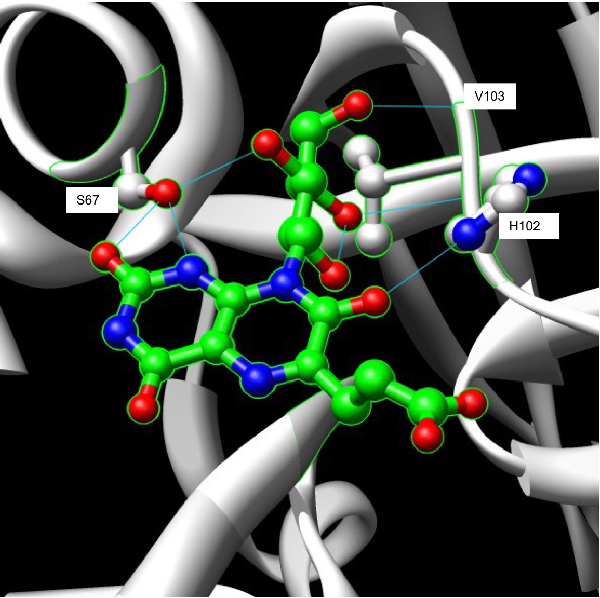
Hydrogen bonding between substrate and enzyme at the N-terminal domain.

== Mechanism ==
No cofactors are needed for catalysis. Additionally, the formation of riboflavin from 6,7-dimethyl-8-ribityllumazine can occur in boiling aqueous solution in the absence riboflavin synthase. The reaction is as follows:

(2) 6,7-dimethyl-8-ribityllumazine → riboflavin + 5-amino-6-ribitylamino-uracil

At the interface of the substrate between monomer pairs, the enzyme holds the two 6,7-dimethyl-8-ribityllumazine molecules in position via hydrogen bonding to catalyze the dismutation reaction. Additionally, acid/base catalysis by the amino acid residues has been suggested. Specific residues may include the His102/Thr148 dyad as a base for deprotonation of the C7a methyl group. Of the dyad, His102 is from the N-barrel and Thr148 is from the C-barrel, highlighting the importance of the proximity of the two subunits of the enzyme in the early stages of the reaction. It has also been suggested that the identity of the nucleophile is one of the following conserved residues: Ser146, Ser41, Cys48, or Thr148, or water in the uncatalyzed reaction. In studies on the role of Cys48 as a possible nucleophile, it has not been determined if nucleophilic displacement occurs via an SN1 or SN2 reaction.

During the dismutation reaction, a four carbon unit is exchanged between the two molecules of 6,7-dimethyl-8-ribityllumazine. In the course of the reaction, a pentacyclic molecule is created which is then broken apart into riboflavin and 5-amino-6-ribitylamino-2,4(1H,3H)-pyrimidinedione. Interestingly, archeal riboflavin synthase creates an "enantiomeric" intermediate as opposed to eubacterial, fungal and plant riboflavin synthase, where the attack of one molecule proceeds from the opposite face compared to the other enzyme. The exact mechanism of the formation of cyclic adduct is unknown. It is also unknown how exactly the mechanism proceeds when not catalyzed by an enzyme.

== Drug production ==
Scientists have hypothesized that enzymes involved in the riboflavin biosynthesis pathway, including riboflavin synthase, can be used to develop antibacterial drugs in order to treat infections caused by Gram-negative bacteria and yeasts. This hypothesis is based on the inability of Gram-negative bacteria, such as E. coli and S. typhimurium, to uptake riboflavin from the external environment. As Gram-negative bacteria need to produce their own riboflavin, inhibiting riboflavin synthase or other enzymes involved in the pathway may be useful tools in developing antibacterial drugs.

The most potent riboflavin synthase inhibitor is 9-D-ribityl-1,3,7-trihydropurine-2,6,8-trione, with K_{i} value of 0.61 μM. It is thought to work through competitive inhibition with 6,7-dimethyl-8-ribityllumazine.

== See also ==
- Lumazine synthase
