= 6,7-Dimethyl-8-ribityllumazine =

Names
- IUPAC name 8-(1-Deoxy-D-ribitol-1-yl)-6,7-dimethylpteridine-2,4(3H,8H)-dione
- Systematic IUPAC name 6,7-Dimethyl-8-[(2S,3S,4R)-2,3,4,5-tetrahydropentyl]pteridine-2,4(3H,8H)-dione

Identifiers
CAS Number	5118-16-1
3D model (JSmol)	Interactive image
ChEBI	CHEBI:17601
ChemSpider	147805
MeSH	6,7-dimethyl-8-ribityllumazine
PubChem CID	168989
UNII	O1DSD0WC7M
CompTox Dashboard (EPA)	DTXSID90199199
- InChI: InChI=1S/C13H18N4O6/c1-5-6(2)17(3-7(19)10(21)8(20)4-18)11-9(14-5)12(22)16-13(23)15-11/h7-8,10,18-21H,3-4H2,1-2H3,(H,16,22,23)/t7-,8+,10-/m0/s1 Key: SXDXRJZUAJBNFL-XKSSXDPKSA-N; InChI=1/C13H18N4O6/c1-5-6(2)17(3-7(19)10(21)8(20)4-18)11-9(14-5)12(22)16-13(23)15-11/h7-8,10,18-21H,3-4H2,1-2H3,(H,16,22,23)/t7-,8+,10-/m0/s1 Key: SXDXRJZUAJBNFL-XKSSXDPKBB
- SMILES: O=C2/N=C\1/N(\C(=C(/N=C/1C(=O)N2)C)C)C[C@H](O)[C@H](O)[C@H](O)CO

Properties
Chemical formula	C_{13}H_{18}N_{4}O_{6}
Molar mass	326.305 g/mol
- Except where otherwise noted, data are given for materials in their standard state (at 25 °C [77 °F], 100 kPa). verify (what is ?) Infobox references

6,7-Dimethyl-8-ribityllumazine is a precursor for riboflavin. It is acted upon by riboflavin synthase.
