= Lumazine synthase =

Class of enzymes

6,7-dimethyl-8-ribityllumazine synthase

Identifiers
- EC no.: 2.5.1.78

Databases
- IntEnz: IntEnz view
- BRENDA: BRENDA entry
- ExPASy: NiceZyme view
- KEGG: KEGG entry
- MetaCyc: metabolic pathway
- PRIAM: profile
- PDB structures: RCSB PDB PDBe PDBsum
Search
- PMC: articles
- PubMed: articles
- NCBI: proteins

Lumazine synthase (EC 2.5.1.78, 6,7-dimethyl-8-ribityllumazine synthase, 6,7-dimethyl-8-ribityllumazine synthase 2, 6,7-dimethyl-8-ribityllumazine synthase 1, lumazine synthase 2, lumazine synthase 1, type I lumazine synthase, type II lumazine synthase, RIB4, MJ0303, RibH, Pbls, MbtLS, RibH1 protein, RibH2 protein, RibH1, RibH2) is an enzyme with systematic name 5-amino-6-(D-ribitylamino)uracil butanedionetransferase. This enzyme catalyses the following chemical reaction

1-deoxy-L-erythrulose 4-phosphate + 5-amino-6-(D-ribitylamino)uracil $\rightleftharpoons$ 6,7-dimethyl-8-(D-ribityl)lumazine + 2 H_{2}O + phosphate

This reaction is part of the biosynthesis of riboflavin (vitamin B2). Lumazine synthase is thus found in those organisms (plants, fungi and most microorganisms) which produce riboflavin.

Depending on the species, 5, 10 or 60 copies of the enzyme bind together to form homomers. In the case of 60 copies, the enzyme units form a icosahedral hollow cage. In some bacteria, this cage contains another enzyme involved in the riboflavin synthesis, riboflavin synthase.

These icosahedral cages have been investigated for use in drug delivery or as vaccines, delivering antigens. Using directed evolution, Lumazine synthase has been modified so that it forms larger cages that preferentially package RNA molecules that code for the protein, akin to a virus capsid.
