= L-glutamate oxidase =

Enzyme

Identifiers
- EC no.: 1.4.3.11
- CAS no.: 39346-34-4

Databases
- BRENDA: enzyme data
- ExPASy: NiceZyme view
- KEGG: enzyme entry
- MetaCyc: metabolic pathway
- Rhea: reactions
- PDB structures: RCSB PDB PDBe PDBsum
- Gene Ontology: AmiGO / QuickGO
Search
- PMC: articles
- PubMed: articles
- NCBI: proteins

In enzymology, L-glutamate oxidase (EC 1.4.3.11) is an enzyme that catalyzes the chemical reaction

L-glutamic acid
+ H_{2}O
O_{2}
H_{2}O_{2}
O_{2}
H_{2}O_{2}
α-Ketoglutaric acid
+ NH_{3}

The three substrates of this enzyme are L-glutamic acid, water, and oxygen. Its products are α-ketoglutaric acid, hydrogen peroxide, and ammonia.

This enzyme belongs to the family of oxidoreductases, specifically those acting on the CH-NH_{2} group of donors with oxygen as acceptor. The systematic name of this enzyme class is L-glutamate:oxygen oxidoreductase (deaminating). Other names in common use include glutamate (acceptor) dehydrogenase, glutamate oxidase, glutamic acid oxidase, glutamic dehydrogenase (acceptor), and L-glutamic acid oxidase. It employs one cofactor, FAD.
