= Riboflavin =

Vitamin

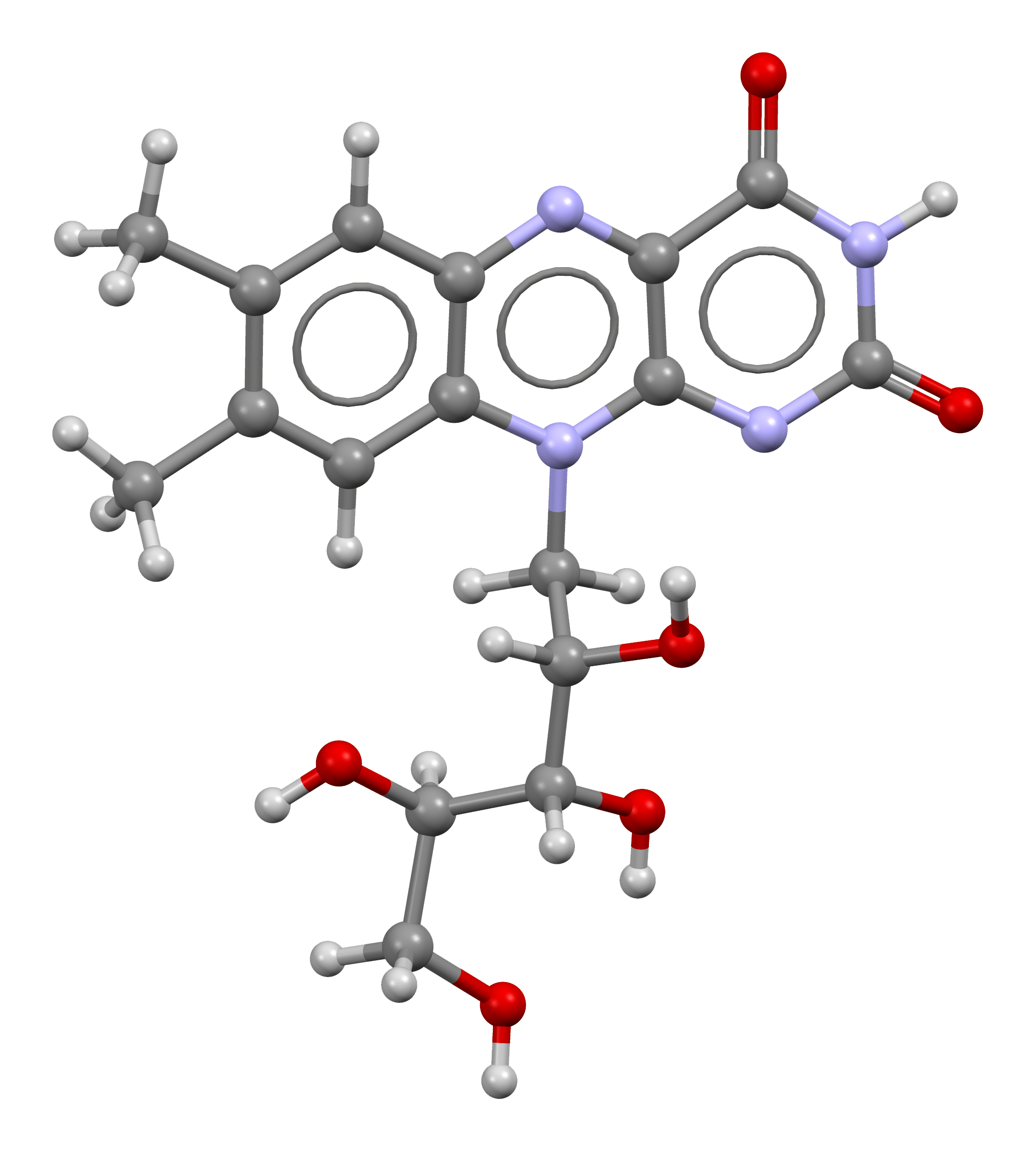
- Chemical structure

Clinical data
- Trade names: Many
- Other names: lactochrome, lactoflavin, vitamin G
- AHFS/Drugs.com: Monograph
- License data: US DailyMed: Riboflavin
- Routes of administration: By mouth, intramuscular, intravenous
- ATC code: A11HA04 (WHO) S01XA26 (WHO)

Legal status
- Legal status: US: OTC / Rx-only

Pharmacokinetic data
- Elimination half-life: 66 to 84 minutes
- Excretion: Urine

Identifiers
- IUPAC name: 7,8-Dimethyl-10-[(2S,3S,4R)-2,3,4,5-tetrahydroxypentyl]benzo[g]pteridine-2,4-dione
- CAS Number: 83-88-5
- PubChem CID: 493570
- IUPHAR/BPS: 6578
- DrugBank: DB00140
- ChemSpider: 431981
- UNII: TLM2976OFR
- KEGG: D00050
- ChEBI: CHEBI:17015
- ChEMBL: ChEMBL1534
- E number: E101, E101(iii) (colours)
- CompTox Dashboard (EPA): DTXSID8021777
- ECHA InfoCard: 100.001.370

Chemical and physical data
- Formula: C_{17}H_{20}N_{4}O_{6}
- Molar mass: 376.369 g·mol^{−1}
- 3D model (JSmol): Interactive image
- SMILES: c12cc(C)c(C)cc1N=C3C(=O)NC(=O)N=C3N2C[C@H](O)[C@H](O)[C@H](O)CO
- InChI: InChI=InChI=1S/C17H20N4O6/c1-7-3-9-10(4-8(7)2)21(5-11(23)14(25)12(24)6-22)15-13(18-9)16(26)20-17(27)19-15/h3-4,11-12,14,22-25H,5-6H2,1-2H3,(H,20,26,27)/t11-,12+,14-/m0/s1; Key:AUNGANRZJHBGPY-SCRDCRAPSA-N

Riboflavin, also known as vitamin B_{2}, is a vitamin found in food and sold as a dietary supplement. It is essential to the formation of two major coenzymes, flavin mononucleotide and flavin adenine dinucleotide. These coenzymes are involved in energy metabolism, cellular respiration, and antibody production, as well as normal growth and development. The coenzymes are also required for the metabolism of niacin, vitamin B_{6}, and folate. Riboflavin is prescribed to treat corneal thinning, and taken orally, may reduce the incidence of migraine headaches in adults.

Riboflavin deficiency is rare and is usually accompanied by deficiencies of other vitamins and nutrients. It may be prevented or treated by oral supplements or by injections. As a water-soluble vitamin, any riboflavin consumed in excess of nutritional requirements is not stored; it is either not absorbed or is absorbed and quickly excreted in urine, causing the urine to have a bright yellow tint. Natural sources of riboflavin include meat, fish and fowl, eggs, dairy products, green vegetables, mushrooms, and almonds. Some countries require its addition to grains.

In its purified, solid form, it is a water-soluble yellow-orange crystalline powder. In addition to its function as a vitamin, it is used as a food coloring agent. Biosynthesis takes place in bacteria, fungi and plants, but not animals. Industrial synthesis of riboflavin was initially achieved using a chemical process, but current commercial manufacturing relies on fermentation methods using strains of fungi and genetically modified bacteria.

In 2023, riboflavin was the 294th most commonly prescribed medication in the United States, with more than 400,000 prescriptions.

== Definition ==
Riboflavin, also known as vitamin B_{2}, is a water-soluble vitamin and is one of the B vitamins. Unlike folate and vitamin B_{6}, which occur in several chemically related forms known as vitamers, riboflavin is only one chemical compound. It is a starting compound in the synthesis of the coenzymes flavin mononucleotide (FMN, also known as riboflavin-5'-phosphate) and flavin adenine dinucleotide (FAD). FAD is the more abundant form of flavin, reported to bind to 75% of the number of flavin-dependent protein encoded genes in the all-species genome (the flavoproteome) and serves as a co-enzyme for 84% of human-encoded flavoproteins.

In its purified, solid form, riboflavin is a yellow-orange crystalline powder with a slight odor and bitter taste. It is soluble in polar solvents, such as water and aqueous sodium chloride solutions, and slightly soluble in alcohols. It is not soluble in non-polar or weakly polar organic solvents such as chloroform, benzene or acetone. In solution or during dry storage as a powder, riboflavin is heat stable if not exposed to light. When heated to decompose, it releases toxic fumes containing nitric oxide.

== Functions ==
Riboflavin is essential to the formation of two major coenzymes, FMN and FAD. These coenzymes are involved in energy metabolism, cell respiration, antibody production, growth and development. Riboflavin is essential for the metabolism of carbohydrates, protein and fats. FAD contributes to the conversion of tryptophan to niacin (vitamin B_{3}) and the conversion of vitamin B_{6} to the coenzyme pyridoxal 5'-phosphate requires FMN. Riboflavin is involved in maintaining normal circulating levels of homocysteine; in riboflavin deficiency, homocysteine levels increase, elevating the risk of cardiovascular diseases.

=== Redox reactions ===
Redox reactions are processes that involve the transfer of electrons. The flavin coenzymes support the function of roughly 70-80 flavoenzymes in humans (and hundreds more across all organisms, including those encoded by archeal, bacterial and fungal genomes) that are responsible for one- or two-electron redox reactions which capitalize on the ability of flavins to be converted between oxidized, half-reduced and fully reduced forms. FAD is also required for the activity of glutathione reductase, an essential enzyme in the formation of the endogenous antioxidant, glutathione.

=== Micronutrient metabolism ===
Riboflavin, FMN, and FAD are involved in the metabolism of niacin, vitamin B_{6}, and folate. The synthesis of the niacin-containing coenzymes, NAD and NADP, from tryptophan involves the FAD-dependent enzyme, kynurenine 3-monooxygenase. Dietary deficiency of riboflavin can decrease the production of NAD and NADP, thereby promoting niacin deficiency. Conversion of vitamin B_{6} to its coenzyme, pyridoxal 5'-phosphate, involves the enzyme, pyridoxine 5'-phosphate oxidase, which requires FMN. An enzyme involved in folate metabolism, 5,10-methylenetetrahydrofolate reductase, requires FAD to form the amino acid, methionine, from homocysteine.

Riboflavin deficiency appears to impair the metabolism of the dietary mineral, iron, which is essential to the production of hemoglobin and red blood cells. Alleviating riboflavin deficiency in people who are deficient in both riboflavin and iron improves the effectiveness of iron supplementation for treating iron-deficiency anemia.

== Synthesis ==
=== Biosynthesis ===
Biosynthesis takes place in bacteria, fungi and plants, but not animals. The biosynthetic precursors to riboflavin are ribulose 5-phosphate and guanosine triphosphate. The former is converted to L-3,4-dihydroxy-2-butanone-4-phosphate. Guanosine is degraded to 4-hydroxy-2,4,5-triaminopyrimidine, which is transformed into 5-amino-6-(D-ribitylamino)uracil. These two compounds are then the substrates for the penultimate step in the pathway, catalysed by the enzyme lumazine synthase in reaction EC 2.5.1.78.

In the final step of the biosynthesis, two molecules of 6,7-dimethyl-8-ribityllumazine are combined by the enzyme riboflavin synthase in a dismutation reaction. This generates one molecule of riboflavin and one of 5-amino-6-(D-ribitylamino) uracil. The latter is recycled to the previous reaction in the sequence.

Conversions of riboflavin to the cofactors FMN and FAD are carried out by the enzymes riboflavin kinase and FAD synthetase acting sequentially.

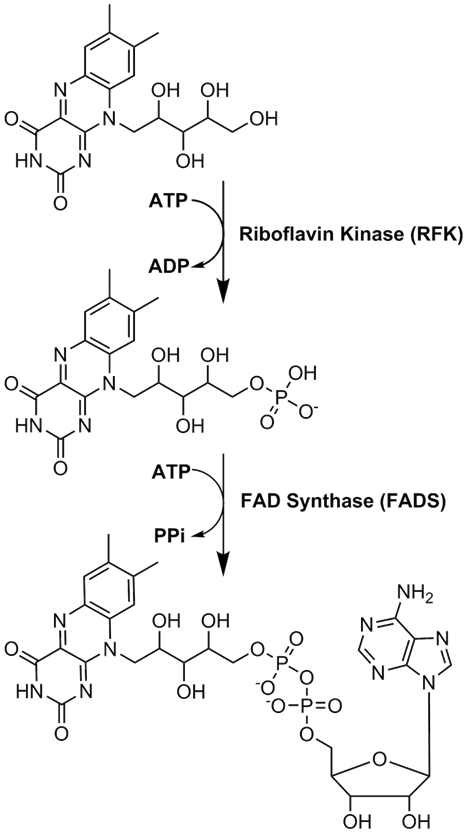
Riboflavin is the biosynthetic precursor of FMN and FAD

=== Industrial synthesis ===
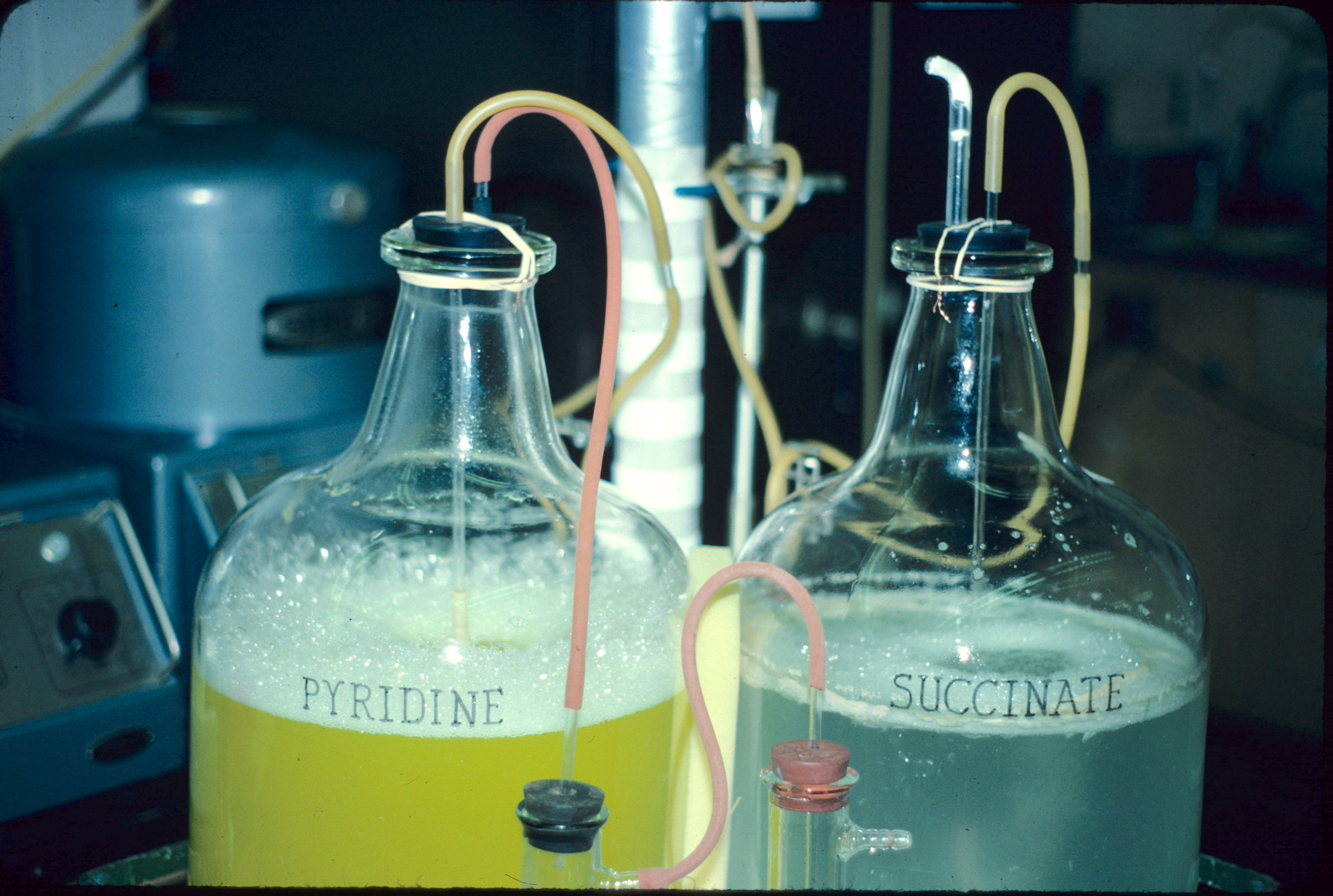
Cultures of Micrococcus luteus growing on pyridine (left) and succinic acid (right). The pyridine culture has turned yellow from the accumulation of riboflavin.

The industrial-scale production of riboflavin uses various microorganisms, including filamentous fungi such as Ashbya gossypii, Candida famata and Candida flaveri, as well as the bacteria Corynebacterium ammoniagenes and Bacillus subtilis. B. subtilis that has been genetically modified to both increase the production of riboflavin and to introduce an antibiotic (ampicillin) resistance marker, is employed at a commercial scale to produce riboflavin for feed and food fortification. By 2012, over 4,000 tonnes per annum were produced by such fermentation processes.

In the presence of high concentrations of hydrocarbons or aromatic compounds, some bacteria overproduce riboflavin, possibly as a protective mechanism. One such organism is Micrococcus luteus (American Type Culture Collection strain number ATCC 49442), which develops a yellow color due to production of riboflavin while growing on pyridine, but not when grown on other substrates, such as succinic acid.

=== Laboratory synthesis ===
The first total synthesis of riboflavin was carried out by Richard Kuhn's group. A substituted aniline, produced by reductive amination using D-ribose, was condensed with alloxan in the final step:

== Uses ==
=== Treatment of corneal thinning ===
Keratoconus is the most common form of corneal ectasia, a progressive thinning of the cornea. The condition is treated by corneal collagen cross-linking, which increases corneal stiffness. Cross-linking is achieved by applying a topical riboflavin solution to the cornea, which is then exposed to ultraviolet A light.

=== Migraine prevention ===
In its 2012 guidelines, the American Academy of Neurology stated that high-dose riboflavin (400 mg) is "probably effective and should be considered for migraine prevention," a recommendation also provided by the UK National Migraine Centre. A 2017 review reported that daily riboflavin taken at 400 mg per day for at least three months may reduce the frequency of migraine headaches in adults. Research on high-dose riboflavin for migraine prevention or treatment in children and adolescents is inconclusive, and so supplements are not recommended.

=== Food coloring ===
Riboflavin is used as a food coloring (yellow-orange crystalline powder), and is designated with the E number, E101, in Europe for use as a food additive.

== Dietary recommendations ==
The National Academy of Medicine updated the Estimated Average Requirements (EARs) and Recommended Dietary Allowances (RDAs) for riboflavin in 1998. The EARs for riboflavin for women and men aged 14 and over are 0.9 mg/day and 1.1 mg/day, respectively; the RDAs are 1.1 and 1.3 mg/day, respectively. RDAs are higher than EARs to provide adequate intake levels for individuals with higher than average requirements. The RDA during pregnancy is 1.4 mg/day and the RDA for lactating females is 1.6 mg/day. For infants up to the age of 12 months, the Adequate Intake (AI) is 0.3–0.4 mg/day and for children aged 1–13 years the RDA increases with age from 0.5 to 0.9 mg/day. As for safety, the IOM sets tolerable upper intake levels (ULs) for vitamins and minerals when evidence is sufficient. In the case of riboflavin there is no UL, as there is no human data for adverse effects from high doses. Collectively the EARs, RDAs, AIs and ULs are referred to as Dietary Reference Intakes (DRIs).

The European Food Safety Authority (EFSA) refers to the collective set of information as Dietary Reference Values, with Population Reference Intake (PRI) instead of RDA, and Average Requirement instead of EAR. AI and UL are defined the same as in United States. For women and men aged 15 and older the PRI is set at 1.6 mg/day. The PRI during pregnancy is 1.9 mg/day and the PRI for lactating females is 2.0 mg/day. For children aged 1–14 years the PRIs increase with age from 0.6 to 1.4 mg/day. These PRIs are higher than the US RDAs. The EFSA also considered the maximum safe intake and like the US National Academy of Medicine, decided that there was not sufficient information to set an UL.

Recommended Dietary Allowances United States
Age group (years)	RDA for riboflavin (mg/d)
0–6 months	0.3*
6–12 months	0.4*
1–3	0.5
4–8	0.6
9–13	0.9
Females 14–18	1.0
Males 14–18	1.3
Females 19+	1.1
Males 19+	1.3
Pregnant females	1.4
Lactating females	1.6
* Adequate intake for infants, no RDA/RDI yet established
Population Reference Intakes European Union
Age group (years)	PRI for riboflavin (mg/d)
7–11 months	0.4
1–3	0.6
4–6	0.7
7–10	1.0
11–14	1.4
15–adult	1.6
Pregnant females	1.9
Lactating females	2.0

=== Safety ===
In humans, there is no evidence for riboflavin toxicity produced by excessive intakes and absorption becomes less efficient as dosage increases. Any excess riboflavin is excreted via the kidneys into urine, resulting in a bright yellow color known as flavinuria. During a clinical trial on the effectiveness of riboflavin for treating the frequency and severity of migraines, subjects were given up to 400 mg of riboflavin orally per day for periods of 3–12 months. Abdominal pains and diarrhea were among the side effects reported.

=== Labeling ===
For US food and dietary supplement labeling purposes the amount in a serving is expressed as a percent of Daily Value (%DV). For riboflavin labeling purposes 100% of the Daily Value was 1.7 mg, but as of 27 May 2016, it was revised to 1.3 mg to bring it into agreement with the RDA. A table of the old and new adult daily values is provided at Reference Daily Intake.

== Sources ==
The US Agricultural Research Service maintains a food composition database from which riboflavin content in hundreds of foods can be searched.

Source	Amount (mg) (per 100 grams)
Beef liver, pan-fried	3.42
Chicken liver, pan-fried	2.31
Whey protein powder	2.02
Salmon, cooked, wild/farmed	0.49/0.14
Cows' milk, whole	0.41 (one cup)
Turkey, cooked, dark/breast	0.38/0.21
Pork, cooked, chop	0.23
Chicken eggs, fried	0.23 (one, large)
Chicken, cooked, thigh/breast	0.19/0.11
Beef, ground, cooked	0.18

Source	Amount (mg) (per 100 grams)
Cheese, cheddar	0.43
Yogurt, whole milk	0.25 (one cup)
Almonds	1.14
Mushrooms, white, raw	0.40
Spinach, boiled	0.24
Bread, baked, fortified	0.25
Pasta, cooked, fortified	0.14
Corn grits	0.06
Rice, cooked, brown/white	0.05/0.00

Source	Amount (mg) (per 100 grams)
Avocado	0.14
Kale, boiled	0.14
Sweet potato baked	0.11
Peanuts, roasted	0.11
Tofu, firm	0.10
Beans, green	0.10
Brussels sprouts, boiled	0.08
Romaine lettuce	0.07
Potato, baked, with skin	0.05
Beans, baked	0.04

The white flour produced after milling of wheat has only 67% of its original riboflavin amount left, so white flour is enriched in some countries. Riboflavin is also added to ready-to-eat breakfast cereals. It is difficult to incorporate riboflavin into liquid products because it has poor solubility in water, hence the requirement for riboflavin-5'-phosphate (FMN, also called E101 when used as colorant), a more soluble form of riboflavin. The enrichment of bread and ready-to-eat breakfast cereals contributes significantly to the dietary supply of the vitamin. Free riboflavin is naturally present in animal-sourced foods along with protein-bound FMN and FAD. Cows' milk contains mainly free riboflavin, but both FMN and FAD are present at low concentrations.

=== Fortification ===
Some countries require or recommend fortification of grain foods. As of 2024, 57 countries, mostly in North and South America and southeast Africa, require food fortification of wheat flour or maize (corn) flour with riboflavin or riboflavin-5'-phosphate sodium. The amounts stipulated range from 1.3 to 5.75 mg/kg. An additional 16 countries have a voluntary fortification program. For example, the Indian government recommends 4.0 mg/kg for "maida" (white) and "atta" (whole wheat) flour.

== Absorption, metabolism, excretion ==
More than 90% of riboflavin in the diet is in the form of protein-bound FMN and FAD. Exposure to gastric acid in the stomach releases the coenzymes, which are subsequently enzymatically hydrolyzed in the proximal small intestine to release free riboflavin.

Absorption occurs via a rapid active transport system, with some additional passive diffusion occurring at high concentrations. Bile salts facilitate uptake, so absorption is improved when the vitamin is consumed with a meal. The majority of newly absorbed riboflavin is taken up by the liver on the first pass, indicating that postprandial appearance of riboflavin in blood plasma may underestimate absorption. Three riboflavin transporter proteins have been identified: RFVT1 is present in the small intestine and also in the placenta; RFVT2 is highly expressed in brain and salivary glands; and RFVT3 is most highly expressed in the small intestine, testes, and prostate. Infants with mutations in the genes encoding these transport proteins can be treated with riboflavin administered orally.

Riboflavin is reversibly converted to FMN and then FAD. From riboflavin to FMN is the function of zinc-requiring riboflavin kinase; the reverse is accomplished by a phosphatase. From FMN to FAD is the function of magnesium-requiring FAD synthase; the reverse is accomplished by a pyrophosphatase. FAD appears to be an inhibitory end-product that down-regulates its own formation.

When excess riboflavin is absorbed by the small intestine, it is quickly removed from the blood and excreted in urine. Urine color is used as a hydration status biomarker and, under normal conditions, correlates with urine specific gravity and urine osmolality. However, riboflavin supplementation in large excess of requirements causes urine to appear more yellow than normal. With normal dietary intake, about two-thirds of urinary output is riboflavin, the remainder having been partially metabolized to hydroxymethylriboflavin from oxidation within cells, and as other metabolites. When consumption exceeds the ability to absorb, riboflavin passes into the large intestine, where it is catabolized by bacteria to various metabolites that can be detected in feces. There is speculation that unabsorbed riboflavin could affect the large intestine microbiome.

== Deficiency ==
=== Prevalence ===
Riboflavin deficiency is uncommon in the US and in other countries with wheat flour or corn meal fortification programs. From data collected in biannual surveys of the US population, for ages 20 and over, 22% of women and 19% of men reported consuming a supplement that contained riboflavin, typically a vitamin-mineral multi-supplement. For the non-supplement users, the dietary intake of adult women averaged 1.74 mg/day and men 2.44 mg/day. These amounts exceed the RDAs for riboflavin of 1.1 and 1.3 mg/day respectively. For all age groups, on average, consumption from food exceeded the RDAs. A 2001-02 US survey reported that less than 3% of the population consumed less than the Estimated Average Requirement of riboflavin.

=== Signs and symptoms ===
Riboflavin deficiency (also called ariboflavinosis) results in stomatitis, symptoms of which include chapped and fissured lips, inflammation of the corners of the mouth (angular stomatitis), sore throat, painful red tongue, and hair loss. The eyes can become itchy, watery, bloodshot, and sensitive to light. Riboflavin deficiency is associated with anemia. Prolonged riboflavin insufficiency may cause degeneration of the liver and nervous system. Riboflavin deficiency may increase the risk of preeclampsia in pregnant women. Deficiency of riboflavin during pregnancy can result in fetal birth defects, including heart and limb deformities.

=== Risk factors ===
People at risk of having low riboflavin levels include alcoholics, vegetarian athletes, and practitioners of veganism. Pregnant or lactating women and their infants may also be at risk, if the mother avoids meat and dairy products. Anorexia and lactose intolerance increase the risk of riboflavin deficiency. People with physically demanding lives, such as athletes and laborers, may require higher riboflavin intake. The conversion of riboflavin into FAD and FMN is impaired in people with hypothyroidism, adrenal insufficiency, and riboflavin transporter deficiency.

=== Causes ===
Riboflavin deficiency is usually found together with other nutrient deficiencies, particularly of other water-soluble vitamins. A deficiency of riboflavin can be primary (i.e. caused by poor vitamin sources in the regular diet) or secondary, which may be a result of conditions that affect absorption in the intestine. Secondary deficiencies are typically caused by the body not being able to use the vitamin, or by an increased rate of excretion of the vitamin. Diet patterns that increase risk of deficiency include veganism and low-dairy vegetarianism. Diseases such as cancer, heart disease and diabetes may cause or exacerbate riboflavin deficiency.

There are rare genetic defects that compromise riboflavin absorption, transport, metabolism or use by flavoproteins. One of these is riboflavin transporter deficiency, previously known as Brown–Vialetto–Van Laere syndrome. Variants of the genes SLC52A2 and SLC52A3 which code for transporter proteins RDVT2 and RDVT3, respectively, are defective. Infants and young children present with muscle weakness, cranial nerve deficits including hearing loss, sensory symptoms including sensory ataxia, feeding difficulties, and respiratory distress caused by a sensorimotor axonal neuropathy and cranial nerve pathology. When untreated, infants with riboflavin transporter deficiency have labored breathing and are at risk of dying in the first decade of life. Treatment with oral supplementation of high amounts of riboflavin is lifesaving.

Other inborn errors of metabolism include riboflavin-responsive multiple acyl-CoA dehydrogenase deficiency, also known as a subset of glutaric acidemia type 2, and the C677T variant of the methylenetetrahydrofolate reductase enzyme, which in adults has been associated with risk of high blood pressure.

=== Diagnosis and assessment ===
The assessment of riboflavin status is essential for confirming cases with non-specific symptoms whenever deficiency is suspected. Total riboflavin excretion in healthy adults with normal riboflavin intake is about 120 micrograms per day, while excretion of less than 40 micrograms per day indicates deficiency. Riboflavin excretion rates decrease as a person ages, but increase during periods of chronic stress and the use of some prescription drugs.

Indicators used in humans are erythrocyte glutathione reductase (EGR), erythrocyte flavin concentration and urinary excretion. The erythrocyte glutathione reductase activity coefficient (EGRAC) provides a measure of tissue saturation and long-term riboflavin status. Results are expressed as an activity coefficient ratio, determined by enzyme activity with and without the addition of FAD to the culture medium. An EGRAC of 1.0 to 1.2 indicates that adequate amounts of riboflavin are present; 1.2 to 1.4 is considered low, greater than 1.4 indicates deficient. For the less sensitive "erythrocyte flavin method", values greater than 400 nmol/L are considered adequate and values below 270 nmol/L are considered deficient. Urinary excretion is expressed as nmol of riboflavin per gram of creatinine. Low is defined as in the range of 50 to 72 nmol/g. Deficient is below 50 nmol/g. Urinary excretion load tests have been used to determine dietary requirements. For adult men, as oral doses were increased from 0.5 mg to 1.1 mg, there was a modest linear increase in urinary riboflavin, reaching 100 micrograms for a subsequent 24-hour urine collection. Beyond a load dose of 1.1 mg, urinary excretion increased rapidly, so that with a dose of 2.5 mg, urinary output was 800 micrograms for a 24-hour urine collection.

== History ==
The name "riboflavin" comes from "ribose" (the sugar whose reduced form, ribitol, forms part of its structure) and "flavin", the ring-moiety that imparts the yellow color to the oxidized molecule (from Latin flavus, "yellow"). The reduced form, which occurs in metabolism along with the oxidized form, appears as orange-yellow needles or crystals. The earliest reported identification, predating any concept of vitamins as essential nutrients, was by Alexander Wynter Blyth. In 1879, Blyth isolated a water-soluble component of cows' milk whey, which he named "lactochrome", that fluoresced yellow-green when exposed to light.

In the early 1900s, several research laboratories were investigating constituents of foods, essential to maintain growth in rats. These constituents were initially divided into fat-soluble "vitamine" A and water-soluble "vitamine" B. (The "e" was dropped in 1920.) Vitamin B was further thought to have two components, a heat-labile substance called B_{1} and a heat-stable substance called B_{2}. Vitamin B_{2} was tentatively identified to be the factor necessary for preventing pellagra, but that was later confirmed to be due to niacin (vitamin B_{3}) deficiency. The confusion was due to the fact that riboflavin (B_{2}) deficiency causes stomatitis symptoms similar to those seen in pellagra, but without the widespread peripheral skin lesions. For this reason, early in the history of identifying riboflavin deficiency in humans the condition was sometimes called "pellagra sine pellagra" (pellagra without pellagra).

In 1935, Paul Gyorgy, in collaboration with chemist Richard Kuhn and physician T. Wagner-Jauregg, reported that rats kept on a B_{2}-free diet were unable to gain weight. Isolation of B_{2} from yeast revealed the presence of a bright yellow-green fluorescent product that restored normal growth when fed to rats. The growth restored was directly proportional to the intensity of the fluorescence. This observation enabled the researchers to develop a rapid chemical bioassay in 1933, and then isolate the factor from egg white, calling it ovoflavin. The same group then isolated the a similar preparation from whey and called it lactoflavin. In 1934, Kuhn's group identified the chemical structure of these flavins as identical, settled on "riboflavin" as a name, and were also able to synthesize the vitamin.

Circa 1937, riboflavin was also referred to as "Vitamin G". In 1938, Richard Kuhn was awarded the Nobel Prize in Chemistry for his work on vitamins, which had included B_{2} and B_{6}. In 1939, it was confirmed that riboflavin is essential for human health through a clinical trial conducted by William H. Sebrell and Roy E. Butler. Women fed a diet low in riboflavin developed stomatitis and other signs of deficiency, which were reversed when treated with synthetic riboflavin. The symptoms returned when the supplements were stopped.

== See also ==
- Galactoflavin, a riboflavin antimetabolite
