= Fusil Automático Doble =

Peruvian bullpup assault rifle

- Type: Assault rifle
- Place of origin: Peru

Service history
- In service: 2008–present
- Used by: Peru
- Wars: Internal conflict in Peru

Production history
- Designer: Salomón Braga Lozo
- Designed: 2008
- Manufacturer: SIMA Electrónica
- Produced: 2008–present
- Variants: Light machine gun; Carbine; Sniper rifle

Specifications
- Mass: 3.6 kilograms (7.9 lb)
- Length: 814 mm
- Barrel length: 45 cm
- Cartridge: 5.56×45mm NATO; 40x46mm grenade
- Action: Blowback reload, closed bolt
- Rate of fire: 550 rounds/min
- Muzzle velocity: 860 m/s (2,821.5 ft/s)
- Feed system: 30-round box magazine and various STANAG magazines

The Fusil Automático Doble (English: Double Automatic Rifle) is a Peruvian bullpup assault rifle designed by Peruvian arms designer Salomón Braga Lozo and manufactured by SIMA Electrónica.

Due to its simplicity and light weight, it is used in the Peruvian Army as a secondary weapon. The country was originally intending on purchasing 580,000 AN-94 assault rifles to replace the HK33 already in service, but ended up settling on the FAD due to its price.

== History and development ==
The weapon, designed by Salomón Braga Lozo in 2008, began production the same year by the manufacturer SIMA Electrónica, a subsidiary of SIMA (Servicio Industrial de la Marina), a branch of the Peruvian Navy, located in the port of Callao. It is Peru's first rifle, and is still in service to this day. Each unit costs about 800 to 1200 USD, allowing for mass manufacturing. It is intended to be phased out by a successor, the FAD-V2.

Since it has only been manufactured for limited use in Peru, the weapon has only seen action in Peru's internal conflict, mostly in the VRAEM region of the Peruvian jungle. Otherwise, the rifle only sees use in military bases or national parades. But it has never been fully adopted by the Peruvian Army.

== Description ==
The FAD is made from stamped sheet steel and polymer, incorporating a modern grip, but lacks a full trigger guard, utilizing the cocking handle of its 40mm grenade launcher to prevent any accidental trigger contact. At the top of the handguard there is the sight of the grenade launcher and a Picatinny rail to mount various optical sights, allowing the attachment of different sights, such as night vision, or holographic sights, among others. The magazine is inserted from below with a slight tilt to the left, the ejection is carried out on the right side, and the spent casings are ejected directly downwards, which allows the FAD to be used by right and left handed users without the need for modifications. The mechanisms are activated by direct recoil of the bolt. It has a fire selector and can fire in semi-automatic and automatic mode.

== In popular culture ==
The FAD, and weapons inspired by the FAD have featured in the Call of Duty franchise, including Modern Warfare 3 (2011) and Ghosts. In Modern Warfare 4, the FAD is represented in semblance with a North Korean prototype 6.8mm rifle called the Hyeon Burst, which features semi-automatic and 3-round burst fire, with full-automatic mode available through attachments.

== See also ==
- FN F2000 – (Belgium)
- SAR 21 – (Singapore)
