= Riboflavin kinase =

Class of enzymes

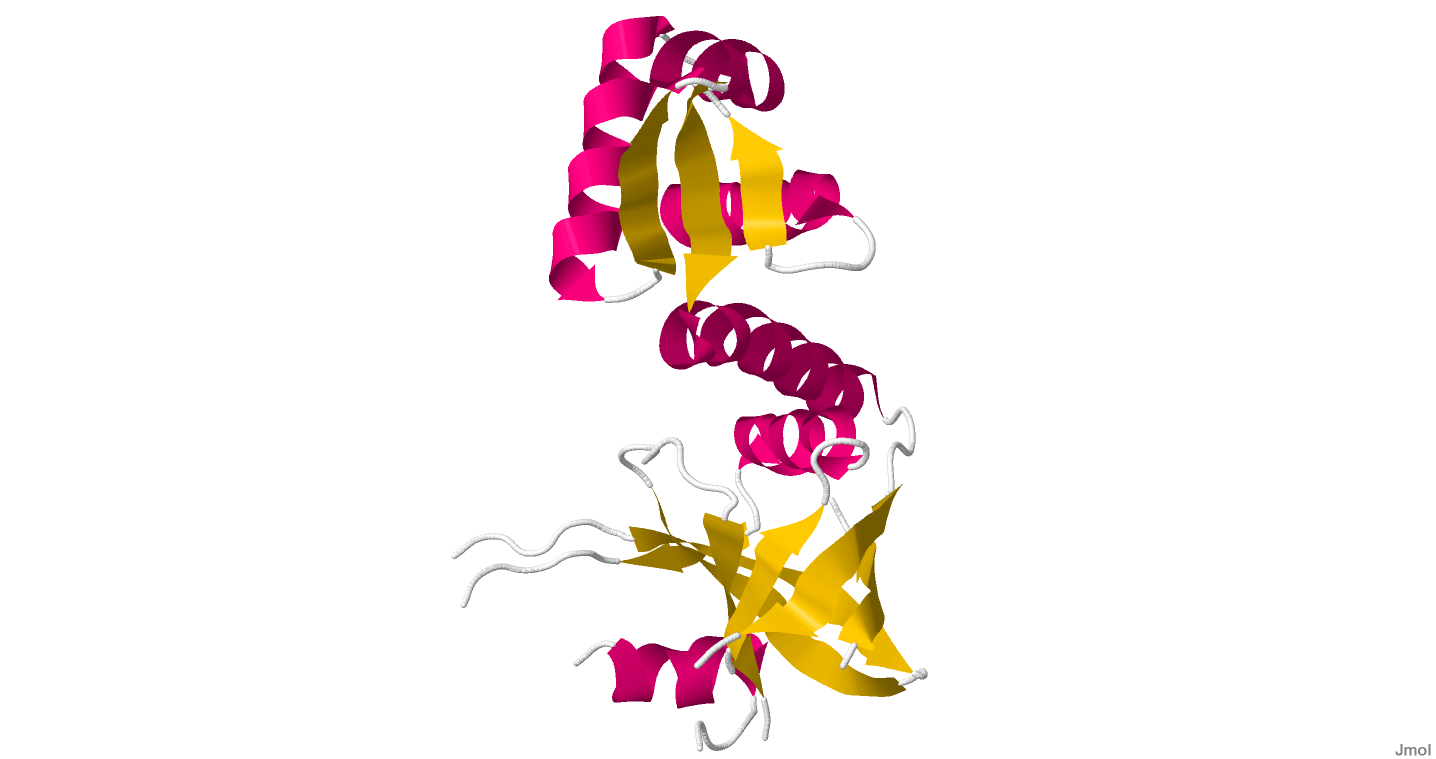
- Crystal structure of riboflavin kinase from Thermoplasma acidophilum.

Identifiers
- EC no.: 2.7.1.26
- CAS no.: 9032-82-0

Databases
- BRENDA: enzyme data
- ExPASy: NiceZyme view
- KEGG: enzyme entry
- MetaCyc: metabolic pathway
- Rhea: reactions
- PDB structures: RCSB PDB PDBe PDBsum
- Gene Ontology: AmiGO / QuickGO
Search
- PMC: articles
- PubMed: articles
- NCBI: proteins

Riboflavin Kinase
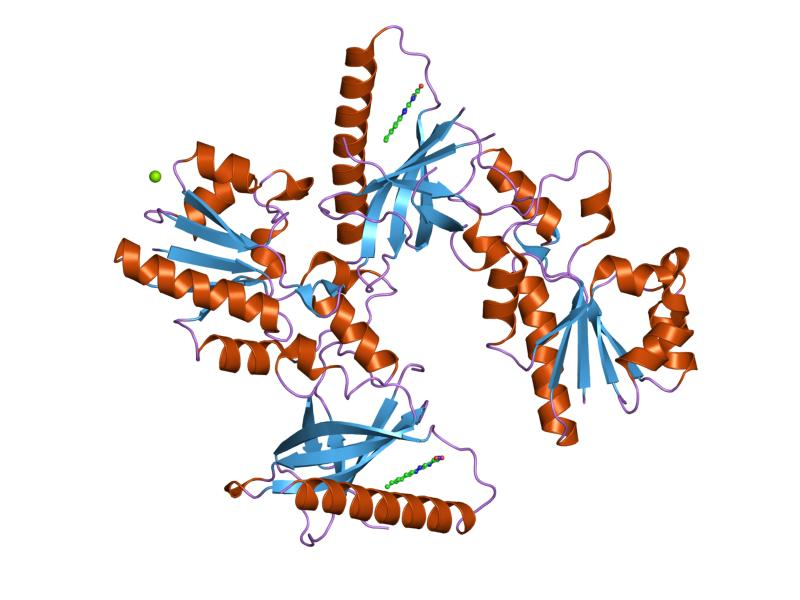
- crystal structure of flavin binding to fad synthetase from thermotoga maritina

Identifiers
- Symbol: Flavokinase
- Pfam: PF01687
- InterPro: IPR015865
- SCOP2: 1mrz / SCOPe / SUPFAM
Available protein structures:
- PDB: IPR015865 PF01687 (ECOD; PDBsum)
- AlphaFold: IPR015865; PF01687

Riboflavin kinase

Identifiers
- Symbol: Riboflavin_kinase
- Pfam: PF01687
- InterPro: IPR015865
Available protein structures:
- PDB: PDB: 1mrz PDB: 1n05 PDB: 1n06 PDB: 1n07 PDB: 1n08 PDB: 1nb0 PDB: 1nb9 PDB: 1p4m PDB: 1q9s PDB: 1s4m IPR015865 PF01687 (ECOD; PDBsum)
- AlphaFold: IPR015865; PF01687

Riboflavin kinase (EC 2.7.1.26) is an enzyme that catalyzes the chemical reaction

ATP +
riboflavin
ADP +
flavin mononucleotide

The enzyme originally characterised from plants and yeast converts the B vitamin, riboflavin, to flavin mononucleotide (FMN) by transferring a phosphate group from the cofactor, adenosine triphosphate (ATP), which is converted to adenosine diphosphate (ADP).

Riboflavin is converted into catalytically active cofactors (FAD and FMN) by the actions of riboflavin kinase, which converts it into FMN, and FAD synthetase (EC 2.7.7.2), which adenylates FMN to FAD. Eukaryotes usually have two separate enzymes, while most prokaryotes have a single bifunctional protein that can carry out both catalyses, although exceptions occur in both cases. While eukaryotic monofunctional riboflavin kinase is orthologous to the bifunctional prokaryotic enzyme, the monofunctional FAD synthetase differs from its prokaryotic counterpart, and is instead related to the PAPS-reductase family. The bacterial FAD synthetase that is part of the bifunctional enzyme has remote similarity to nucleotidyl transferases and, hence, it may be involved in the adenylylation reaction of FAD synthetases.

This enzyme is a transferase, specifically one transferring phosphorus-containing groups (phosphotransferases) with an alcohol group as acceptor. The systematic name of this enzyme class is ATP:riboflavin 5'-phosphotransferase. This enzyme is also called flavokinase.

However, archaeal riboflavin kinases (EC 2.7.1.161) in general utilize CTP rather than ATP as the donor nucleotide, catalyzing the reaction

CTP + riboflavin $\rightleftharpoons$ CDP + FMN

Riboflavin kinase can also be isolated from other types of bacteria, all with similar function but a different number of amino acids.

== Structure ==
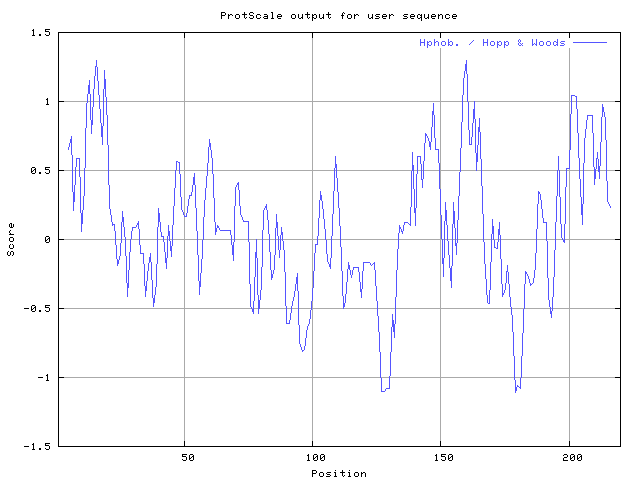

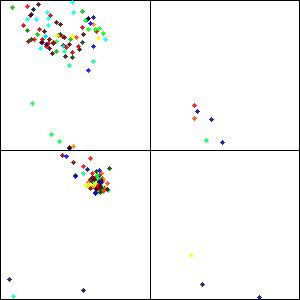

The complete enzyme arrangement can be observed with X-ray crystallography and with NMR. The riboflavin kinase enzyme isolated from Thermoplasma acidophilum contains 220 amino acids. The structure of this enzyme has been determined X-ray crystallography at a resolution of 2.20 Å. Its secondary structure contains 69 residues (30%) in alpha helix form, and 60 residues (26%) a beta sheet conformation. The enzyme contains a magnesium binding site at amino acids 131 and 133, and a Flavin mononucleotide binding site at amino acids 188 and 195.

As of late 2007, 14 structures have been solved for this class of enzymes, with PDB accession codes PDB: 1N05, PDB: 1N06, PDB: 1N07, PDB: 1N08, PDB: 1NB0, PDB: 1NB9, PDB: 1P4M, PDB: 1Q9S, PDB: 2P3M, PDB: 2VBS, PDB: 2VBT, PDB: 3CTA, PDB: 2VBU, and PDB: 2VBV.
