= FMN adenylyltransferase =

Class of enzyme

Identifiers
- EC no.: 2.7.7.2
- CAS no.: 9026-37-3

Databases
- IntEnz: IntEnz view
- BRENDA: BRENDA entry
- ExPASy: NiceZyme view
- KEGG: KEGG entry
- MetaCyc: metabolic pathway
- PRIAM: profile
- PDB structures: RCSB PDB PDBe PDBsum
- Gene Ontology: AmiGO / QuickGO
Search
- PMC: articles
- PubMed: articles
- NCBI: proteins

FMN adenylyltransferase (EC 2.7.7.2) is an enzyme that catalyzes the reversible chemical reaction that produces flavin adenine dinucleotide from adenosine triphosphate and flavin mononucleotide (FMN).

== Function ==
Flavin adenine dinucleotide, is a coenzyme found in all organisms. It is produced by FMN adenylyltransferase, which combines adenosine triphosphate and flavin mononucleotide, with inorganic pyrophosphate (PP_{i}) produced as a byproduct:

adenosine triphosphate
+
flavin mononucleotide
PP_{i}
PP_{i}
flavin adenine dinucleotide

The enzyme has been characterised from yeast, plants and humans.

== Nomenclature ==
The enzyme is a transferase, specifically one transferring phosphorus-containing nucleotide groups (nucleotidyltransferases). The systematic name of this enzyme class is ATP:FMN adenylyltransferase. Other names in common use include

- FAD pyrophosphorylase
- riboflavin mononucleotide adenylyltransferase
- adenosine triphosphate-riboflavin mononucleotide transadenylase
- adenosine triphosphate-riboflavine mononucleotide transadenylase
- FAD synthetase
- riboflavin adenine dinucleotide pyrophosphorylase
