= Formate dehydrogenase (disambiguation) =

Formate dehydrogenases are enzymes that catalyse the oxidation of formate to carbon dioxide.

Formate dehydrogenase may also refer to:

- Formate dehydrogenase (acceptor)
- Formate dehydrogenase (cytochrome)
- Formate dehydrogenase (cytochrome-c-553)
- Formate dehydrogenase (NADP^{+})

== See also ==
- Formate dehydrogenase-N
