= Composition of the human body =

Body composition elements

Body composition may be analyzed in various ways. This can be done in terms of the chemical elements present, or by molecular structure e.g., water, protein, fats (or lipids), hydroxyapatite (in bones), carbohydrates (such as glycogen and glucose) and DNA. In terms of tissue type, the body may be analyzed into water, fat, connective tissue, muscle, bone, etc. In terms of cell type, the body contains hundreds of different types of cells, but notably, the largest number of cells contained in a human body (though not the largest mass of cell) are not human cells, but bacteria residing in the normal human gastrointestinal tract.

== Elements ==
The main elements that the human body comprises (including water) can be summarized as CHNOPS.
Element	Symbol	percent mass	percent atoms
Oxygen	O	65.0	24.0
Carbon	C	18.5	12.0
Hydrogen	H	9.5	62.0
Nitrogen	N	2.6	1.1
Calcium	Ca	1.3	0.22
Phosphorus	P	0.6	0.22
Sulfur	S	0.3	0.038
Potassium	K	0.2	0.03
Sodium	Na	0.2	0.037
Chlorine	Cl	0.2	0.024
Magnesium	Mg	0.1	0.015
All others		< 0.1	< 0.3

Parts-per-million cube of relative abundance by mass of elements in an average adult human body down to 1 ppm

About 99% of the mass of the human body is made up of six elements: oxygen, carbon, hydrogen, nitrogen, calcium, and phosphorus. Only about 0.85% is composed of another five elements: potassium, sulfur, sodium, chlorine, and magnesium. All 11 are necessary for life. The remaining elements are trace elements, of which more than a dozen are thought on the basis of good evidence to be necessary for life. All of the mass of the trace elements put together (less than 10 grams for a human body) do not add up to the body mass of magnesium, the least common of the 11 non-trace elements.

=== Other elements ===
Not all elements which are found in the human body in trace quantities play a role in life. Some of these elements are thought to be simple common contaminants without function (examples: caesium, titanium), while many others are thought to be active toxins, depending on amount (cadmium, mercury, lead, radioactives). In humans, arsenic is toxic, and its levels in foods and dietary supplements are closely monitored to reduce or eliminate its intake.

Some elements (silicon, boron, nickel, vanadium) are probably needed by mammals also, but in far smaller doses. Bromine is used by some (though not all) bacteria, fungi, diatoms, and seaweeds, and opportunistically in eosinophils in humans. One study has indicated bromine to be necessary to collagen IV synthesis in humans. Fluorine is used by a number of plants to manufacture toxins but in humans its only known function is as a local topical hardening agent in tooth enamel.

=== Elemental composition list ===
The average 70 kg (150 lb) adult human body contains approximately 7×10^{27} atoms and contains at least detectable traces of 60 chemical elements. About 29 of these elements are thought to play an active positive role in life and health in humans.

The relative amounts of each element vary by individual, mainly due to differences in the proportion of fat, muscle and bone in their body. Persons with more fat will have a higher proportion of carbon and a lower proportion of most other elements (the proportion of hydrogen will be about the same). The numbers in the table are averages of different numbers reported by different references.

The adult human body averages ~53% water. This varies substantially by age, sex, and adiposity. In a large sample of adults of all ages and both sexes, the figure for water fraction by weight was found to be 48 ±6% for females and 58 ±8% water for males. Water is ~11% hydrogen by mass but ~67% hydrogen by atomic percent, and these numbers along with the complementary % numbers for oxygen in water, are the largest contributors to overall mass and atomic composition figures. Because of water content, the human body contains more oxygen by mass than any other element, but more hydrogen by atom-fraction than any other element.

The elements listed below as "Essential in humans" are those listed by the US Food and Drug Administration as essential nutrients, as well as six additional elements: oxygen, carbon, hydrogen, and nitrogen (the fundamental building blocks of life on Earth), sulfur (essential to all cells) and cobalt (a necessary component of vitamin B_{12}). Elements listed as "Possibly" or "Probably" essential are those cited by the US National Research Council as beneficial to human health and possibly or probably essential.

Atomic number	Element	Fraction of mass	Mass (kg)	Atomic percent	Essential in humans	Negative effects of excess	Group
8	Oxygen	0.65	45	26	Yes (e.g. water, electron acceptor and DNA)	Reactive oxygen species	16
6	Carbon	0.18	13	9.5	Yes (organic compounds)		14
1	Hydrogen	0.10	7	63	Yes (e.g. water and DNA)	Acidosis	1
7	Nitrogen	0.02–0.03	1.8	1.1	Yes (e.g. DNA and amino acids)	Nitrogen narcosis	15
20	Calcium	0.011–0.015	1.0	0.21	Yes (e.g. Calmodulin and Hydroxylapatite in bones)	Hypercalcaemia	2
15	Phosphorus	5–7×10^{−3}	0.78	0.12	Yes (e.g. DNA, Phospholipids and Phosphorylation)	Hyperphosphatemia	15
19	Potassium	1.5–2×10^{−3}	0.14	0.029	Yes (e.g. Na^{+}/K^{+}-ATPase)	Hyperkalemia	1
16	Sulfur	2.5×10^{−3}	0.14	0.049	Yes (e.g. Cysteine, Methionine, Biotin, Thiamine)	Sulfhemoglobinemia	16
11	Sodium	1.5×10^{−3}	0.10	0.041	Yes (e.g. Na^{+}/K^{+}-ATPase)	Hypernatremia	1
17	Chlorine	1.5×10^{−3}	0.095	0.027	Yes (e.g. Cl-transporting ATPase)	Hyperchloremia	17
12	Magnesium	500×10^{−6}	0.019	< 0.01	Yes (e.g. binding to ATP and other nucleotides)	Hypermagnesemia	2
26	Iron*	60×10^{−6}	0.0042	< 0.01	Yes (e.g. Hemoglobin, Cytochromes)	Iron overload	8
9	Fluorine	37×10^{−6}	0.0026	< 0.01	Yes (AUS, NZ), No (US, EU), Maybe (WHO)	Fluorine: Highly toxic Fluoride: Toxic in high amounts	17
30	Zinc	32×10^{−6}	0.0023	< 0.01	Yes (e.g. Zinc finger proteins)	Zinc toxicity	12
14	Silicon	20×10^{−6}	0.0010	< 0.01	Probably		14
31	Gallium	4.9×10^{−6}	0.0007	< 0.01	No	Gallium halide poisoning	13
37	Rubidium	4.6×10^{−6}	0.00068	< 0.01	No		1
38	Strontium	4.6×10^{−6}	0.00032	< 0.001	No	Calcium replacement	2
35	Bromine	2.9×10^{−6}	0.00026	< 0.001	Maybe	Bromism	17
82	Lead	1.7×10^{−6}	0.00012	< 0.001	No	Lead poisoning	14
29	Copper	1×10^{−6}	0.000072	< 0.001	Yes (e.g. copper proteins)	Copper toxicity	11
13	Aluminium	870×10^{−9}	0.000060	< 0.001	No	Aluminium poisoning	13
48	Cadmium	720×10^{−9}	0.000050	< 0.001	No	Cadmium poisoning	12
58	Cerium	570×10^{−9}	0.000040	< 0.001	No		
56	Barium	310×10^{−9}	0.000022	< 0.001	No	toxic in higher amounts	2
50	Tin	240×10^{−9}	0.000020	< 0.001	Maybe		14
53	Iodine	160×10^{−9}	0.000020	< 0.001	Yes (e.g. thyroxine, triiodothyronine)	Iodine-induced hyperthyroidism	17
22	Titanium	130×10^{−9}	0.000020	< 0.001	No		4
5	Boron	690×10^{−9}	0.000018	< 0.001	Probably		13
34	Selenium	190×10^{−9}	0.000015	< 0.001	Yes (e.g. selenocysteine)	Selenium toxicity	16
28	Nickel	140×10^{−9}	0.000015	< 0.0001	Maybe	Nickel Toxicity	10
24	Chromium	24×10^{−9}	0.000014	< 0.0001	Maybe		6
25	Manganese	170×10^{−9}	0.000012	< 0.0001	Yes (e.g. Mn-SOD)	Manganism	7
33	Arsenic	260×10^{−9}	0.000007	< 0.0001	Maybe	Arsenic poisoning	15
3	Lithium	31×10^{−9}	0.000007	< 0.0001	Possibly (intercorrelated with the functions of several enzymes, hormones and vitamins)	Lithium toxicity	1
80	Mercury	190×10^{−9}	0.000006	< 0.0001	No	Mercury poisoning	12
55	Caesium	21×10^{−9}	0.000006	< 0.0001	No		1
42	Molybdenum	130×10^{−9}	0.000005	< 0.0001	Yes (e.g. the molybdenum oxotransferases, Xanthine oxidase and Sulfite oxidase)		6
32	Germanium	5×10^{−6}		< 0.0001	No		14
27	Cobalt	21×10^{−9}	0.000003	< 0.0001	Yes (e.g. Cobalamin/Vitamin B_{12})	Cobalt poisoning	9
44	Ruthenium	22×10^{−9}	0.000007	< 0.0001	No		8
51	Antimony	110×10^{−9}	0.000002	< 0.0001	No	toxic	15
47	Silver	10×10^{−9}	0.000002	< 0.0001	No		11
41	Niobium	1600×10^{−9}	0.0000015	< 0.0001	No		5
40	Zirconium	6×10^{−9}	0.000001	< 0.0001	No		4
57	Lanthanum	1370×10^{−9}	8×10^{−7}	< 0.0001	No		
52	Tellurium	120×10^{−9}	7×10^{−7}	< 0.0001	No		16
39	Yttrium		6×10^{−7}	< 0.0001	No		3
83	Bismuth		5×10^{−7}	< 0.0001	No		15
81	Thallium		5×10^{−7}	< 0.0001	No	highly toxic	13
49	Indium		4×10^{−7}	< 0.0001	No		13
79	Gold	3×10^{−9}	2×10^{−7}	< 0.0001	No	uncoated nanoparticles possibly genotoxic	11
21	Scandium		2×10^{−7}	< 0.0001	No		3
73	Tantalum		2×10^{−7}	< 0.0001	No		5
23	Vanadium	260×10^{−9}	0.000020	< 0.0001	Possibly (suggested osteo-metabolism (bone) growth factor)		5
90	Thorium		1×10^{−7}	< 0.0001	No	toxic, radioactive	
92	Uranium		1×10^{−7}	< 0.0001	No	toxic, radioactive	
62	Samarium		5.0×10^{−8}	< 0.0001	No		
74	Tungsten		2.0×10^{−8}	< 0.0001	No		6
4	Beryllium		3.6×10^{−8}	< 0.0001	No	toxic in higher amounts	2
88	Radium		3×10^{−14}	< 0.0001	No	toxic, radioactive	2
2	Helium	20.39×10^{−21}	2.4×10^{−14}	< 0.0001	No	inert gas asphyxiation	18
10	Neon	8.5×10^{−23}	1×10^{−14}	< 0.0001	No	inert gas asphyxiation	18
18	Argon	4.25×10^{−23}	0.5×10^{−14}	< 0.0001	No	inert gas asphyxiation	18
36	Krypton	2.125×10^{−23}	0.25×10^{−14}	< 0.0001	No	inert gas asphyxiation	18

*Iron = ~3 g in males, ~2.3 g in females

Of the 94 naturally occurring chemical elements, 76 are listed in the table above. Of the remaining 18, it is not known how many occur in the human body.

Most of the elements needed for life are relatively common in the Earth's crust. Aluminium, the third most common element in the Earth's crust (after oxygen and silicon), serves no function in living cells, but is toxic in large amounts, depending on its physical and chemical forms and magnitude, duration, frequency of exposure, and how it was absorbed by the human body. Transferrins can bind aluminium.

=== Periodic table ===
Essential elements for higher organisms (eucarya).
H																	He
Li	Be											B	C	N	O	F	Ne
Na	Mg											Al	Si	P	S	Cl	Ar
K	Ca	Sc	Ti	V	Cr	Mn	Fe	Co	Ni	Cu	Zn	Ga	Ge	As	Se	Br	Kr
Rb	Sr	Y	Zr	Nb	Mo	Tc	Ru	Rh	Pd	Ag	Cd	In	Sn	Sb	Te	I	Xe
Cs	Ba	Lu	Hf	Ta	W	Re	Os	Ir	Pt	Au	Hg	Tl	Pb	Bi	Po	At	Rn

Legend:
The four basic organic elements
Quantity elements
Essential trace elements
Essentiality or function debated
Not essential in humans, but essential/beneficial for some non-human eucarya

== Composition ==
The composition of the human body can be classified as follows:

- Water
- Proteins
- Fats (or lipids)
- Hydroxyapatite in bones
- Carbohydrates such as glycogen and glucose
- DNA and RNA
- Inorganic ions such as sodium, potassium, chloride, bicarbonate, phosphate
- Gases mainly being oxygen, carbon dioxide
- Many cofactors.

The estimated contents of a typical 20-micrometre human cell is as follows:

Compound type	Percent of mass	Mol. weight (daltons)	Compound	Percent of molecules
Water	65	18	1.74×10^{14}	98.73
Other inorganics	1.5	N/A	1.31×10^{12}	0.74
Lipids	12	N/A	8.4×10^{11}	0.475
Other organics	0.4	N/A	7.7×10^{10}	0.044
Protein	20	N/A	1.9×10^{10}	0.011
RNA	1.0	N/A	5×10^{7}	3×10^{−5}
DNA	0.1	1×10^{11}	46	3×10^{−11}

== Tissues ==
The main cellular components of the human body
Cell type	% mass	% cell count
Erythrocytes (red blood cells)	4.2	85.0
Muscle cells	28.6	0.001
Adipocytes (fat cells)	18.6	0.2
Other cells	14.3	14.8
Extracellular components	34.3	-

Body composition can also be expressed in terms of various types of material, such as:

- Muscle
- Fat
- Bone and teeth
- Nervous tissue (brain and nerves)
- Hormones
- Connective tissue
- Body fluids (blood, lymph, urine)
- Contents of digestive tract, including intestinal gas
- Air in lungs
- Epithelium

=== Composition by cell type ===
There are many species of bacteria and other microorganisms that live on or inside the average healthy human body. In fact, there are roughly as many microbial as human cells in the human body by number. (much less by mass or volume). Some of these symbionts are necessary for our health. Those that neither help nor harm humans are called commensal organisms.

== See also ==
- List of organs of the human body
- Hydrostatic weighing
- Dietary element
- Composition of blood
- List of human blood components
- Body composition
- Abundance of elements in Earth's crust
- Abundance of the chemical elements
