= Transition metal oxo complex =

Coordination complex containing an oxo ligand

a) Doubly bridging and b) terminal oxo ligands

A transition metal oxo complex is a coordination complex containing an oxo ligand. Formally O^{2–}, an oxo ligand can be bound to one or more metal centers, meaning it can exist as a terminal or (most commonly) as a bridging ligand. Oxo ligands stabilize high oxidation states of a metal. They are also found in several metalloproteins, for example in molybdenum cofactors and in many iron-containing enzymes. One of the earliest synthetic compounds to incorporate an oxo ligand is potassium ferrate (K_{2}FeO_{4}), which was likely prepared by Georg E. Stahl in 1702.

== Reactivity ==
=== Olation and acid-base reactions ===
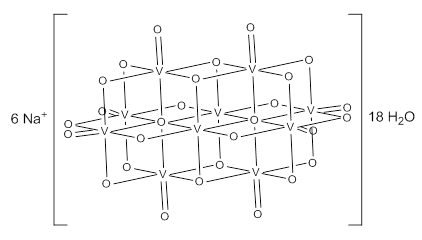
Sodium decavanadate, one of many polyoxometallate salts. The structure illustrates terminal oxo, doubly-bridging oxo, triply-bridging oxo, and sixfold-bridging oxo ligands.

A common reaction exhibited by metal oxo compounds is olation, the condensation process that converts low molecular weight oxides to polymers with M−O−M linkages. Olation often begins with the deprotonation of a metal hydroxo complex. It is the basis for mineralization and the precipitation of metal oxides. For the oxides of d^{0} metals, V^{V}, Nb^{V}, Ta^{V}, Mo^{VI}, and W^{VI}, the olation process affords polyoxometallates, a large class of molecular metal oxides.

=== Oxygen-atom transfer ===
Metal oxo complexes are intermediates in many metal-catalyzed oxidation reactions. Oxygen-atom transfer is common reaction of particular interest in organic chemistry and biochemistry. Some metal oxo complexes are capable of transferring their oxo ligand to organic substrates. One such example of this type of reactivity is from the enzyme superfamily molybdenum oxotransferase.

In water oxidation catalysis, metal oxo complexes are intermediates in the conversion of water to O_{2}.

=== Hydrogen-atom abstraction ===
Transition metal oxo complexes are also capable of abstracting strong C–H, N–H, and O–H bonds. Cytochrome P450 contains a high-valent iron oxo which is capable of abstracting hydrogen atoms from strong C–H bonds.

== Molecular oxides ==
Some of the longest known and most widely used oxo compounds are oxidizing agents such as potassium permanganate (KMnO_{4}) and osmium tetroxide (OsO_{4}). Compounds such as these are widely used for converting alkenes to vicinal diols and alcohols to ketones or carboxylic acids. More selective or gentler oxidizing reagents include pyridinium chlorochromate (PCC) and pyridinium dichromate (PDC). Metal oxo species are capable of catalytic, including asymmetric oxidations of various types. Some metal-oxo complexes promote C-H bond activation, converting hydrocarbons to alcohols.

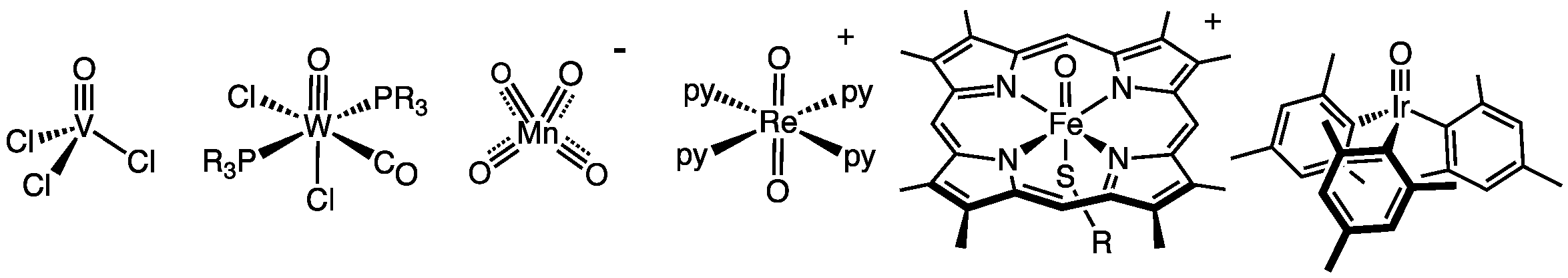
Selection of molecular metal oxides. From left, vanadyl chloride (d^{0}), a tungsten oxo carbonyl (d^{2}), permanganate (d^{0}), [ReO_{2}(pyridine)_{4}]^{+} (d^{2}), simplified view of compound I (a state of cytochrome P450, d^{4}), and Ir(O)(mesityl)_{3} (d^{4}).

=== Metalloenzymes ===
==== Iron(IV)-oxo species ====
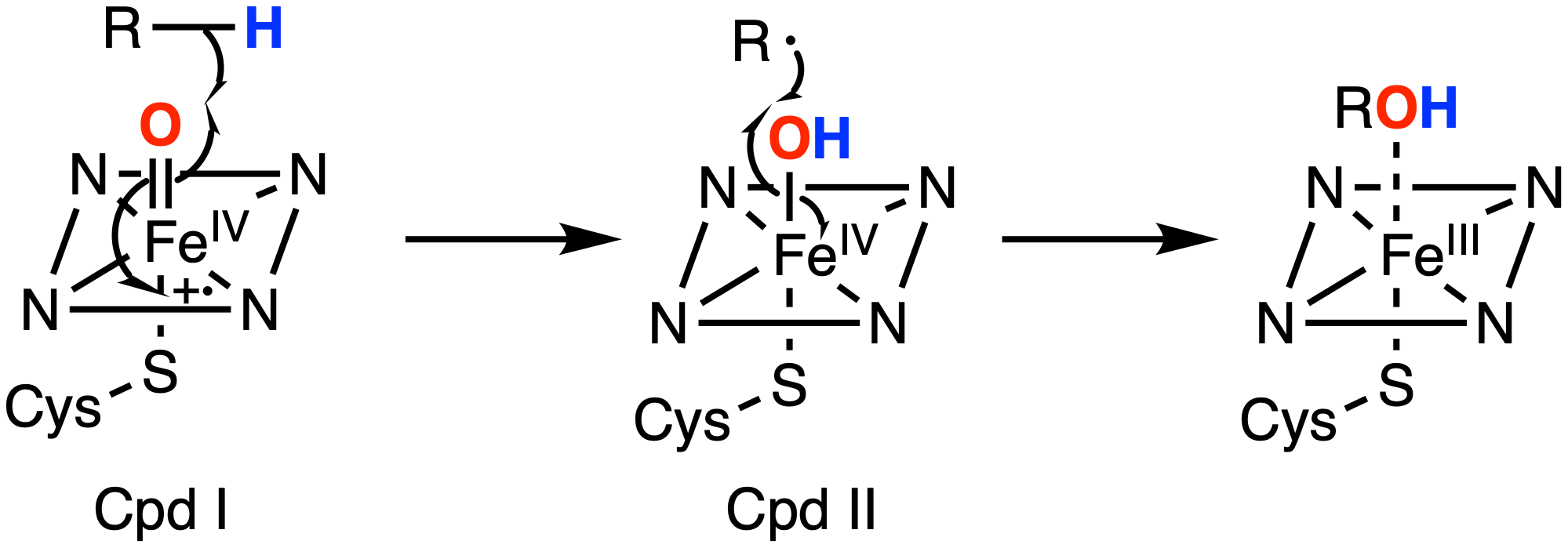
Oxygen rebound mechanism used by cytochrome P450 enzymes for oxidation of aliphatic groups to alcohols by the action of Compound I (adapted from

Iron(IV)-oxo compounds are intermediates in many biological oxidations:

- Alpha-ketoglutarate-dependent hydroxylases activate O_{2} by oxidative decarboxylation of ketoglutarate, generating Fe(IV)=O centers, i.e. ferryl, that hydroxylate a variety of hydrocarbon substrates.
- Cytochrome P450 enzymes, use a heme cofactor, insert ferryl oxygen into saturated C–H bonds, epoxidize olefins, and oxidize aromatic groups.
- Methane monooxygenase (MMO) oxidizes methane to methanol via oxygen atom transfer from an iron-oxo intermediate at its non-heme diiron center. Much effort is aimed at reproducing reactions with synthetic catalysts.

==== Molybdenum/tungsten oxo species ====
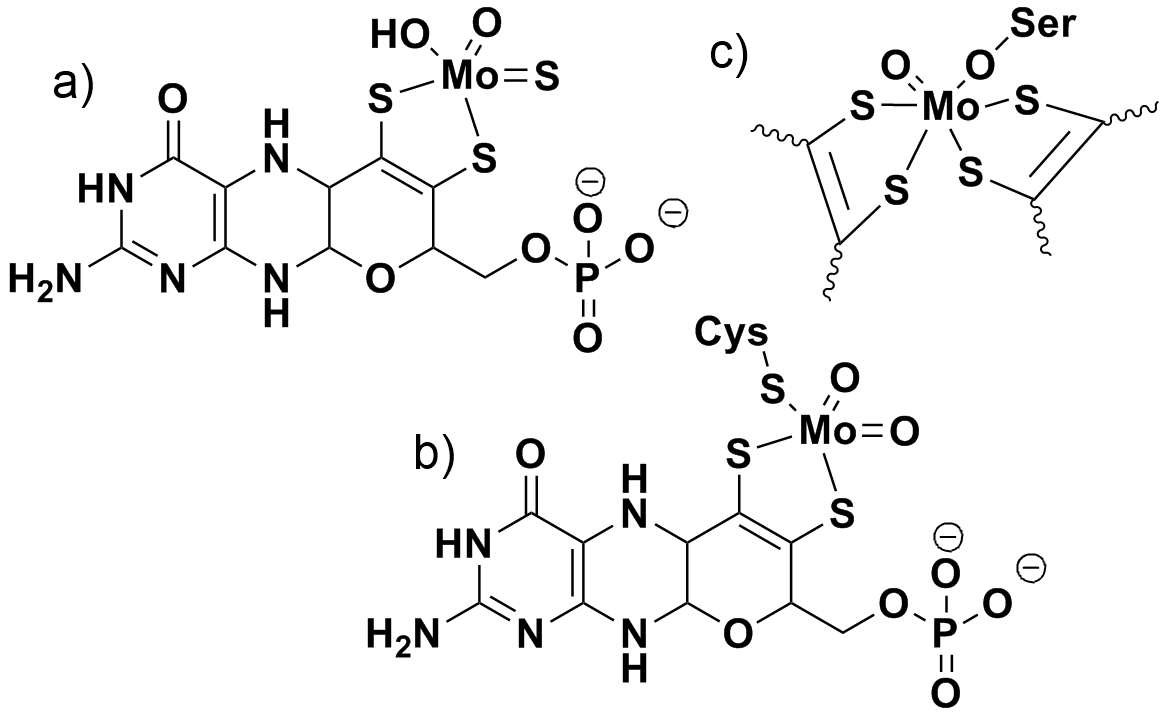
Three structural families of molybdenum cofactors: a) xanthine oxidase, b) sulfite oxidase, and c) (DMSO) reductase. The DMSO reductase features two molybdopterin ligands attached to molybdenum. They are omitted from the figure for simplicity. The rest of the heterocycle is similar to what is shown for the other two cofactors.

The oxo ligand (or analogous sulfido ligand) is nearly ubiquitous in molybdenum and tungsten chemistry, appearing in the ores containing these elements, throughout their synthetic chemistry, and also in their biological role (aside from nitrogenase). The biologically transported species and starting point for biosynthesis is generally accepted to be oxometallates MoO^{2−}_{4} or WO^{2−}_{4}. All Mo/W enzymes, again except nitrogenase, are bound to one or more molybdopterin prosthetic group. The Mo/W centers generally cycle between hexavalent M(VI) and tetravalent M(IV) states. Although there is some variation among these enzymes, members from all three families involve oxygen atom transfer between the Mo/W center and the substrate. Representative reactions from each of the three structural classes are:

- Sulfite oxidase: SO^{2−}_{3} + H_{2}O → SO^{2−}_{4} + 2 H^{+} + 2 e^{−}
- DMSO reductase: H_{3}C−S(O)−CH_{3} (DMSO) + 2 H^{+} + 2 e^{−} → H_{3}C−S−CH_{3} (DMS) + H_{2}O
- Aldehyde ferredoxin oxidoreductase: R−CHO + H_{2}O → R−CO_{2}H + 2 H^{+} + 2 e^{−}

The three different classes of molybdenum cofactors are shown in the adjacent figure. The biological use of tungsten mirrors that of molybdenum.

==== Oxygen-evolving complex ====
The active site for the oxygen-evolving complex (OEC) of photosystem II (PSII) is a Mn_{4}O_{5}Ca centre with several bridging oxo ligands that participate in the oxidation of water to molecular oxygen. The OEC is proposed to utilize a terminal oxo intermediate as a part of the water oxidation reaction. This complex is responsible for the production of nearly all of earth's molecular oxygen. This key link in the oxygen cycle is necessary for much of the biodiversity present on earth.

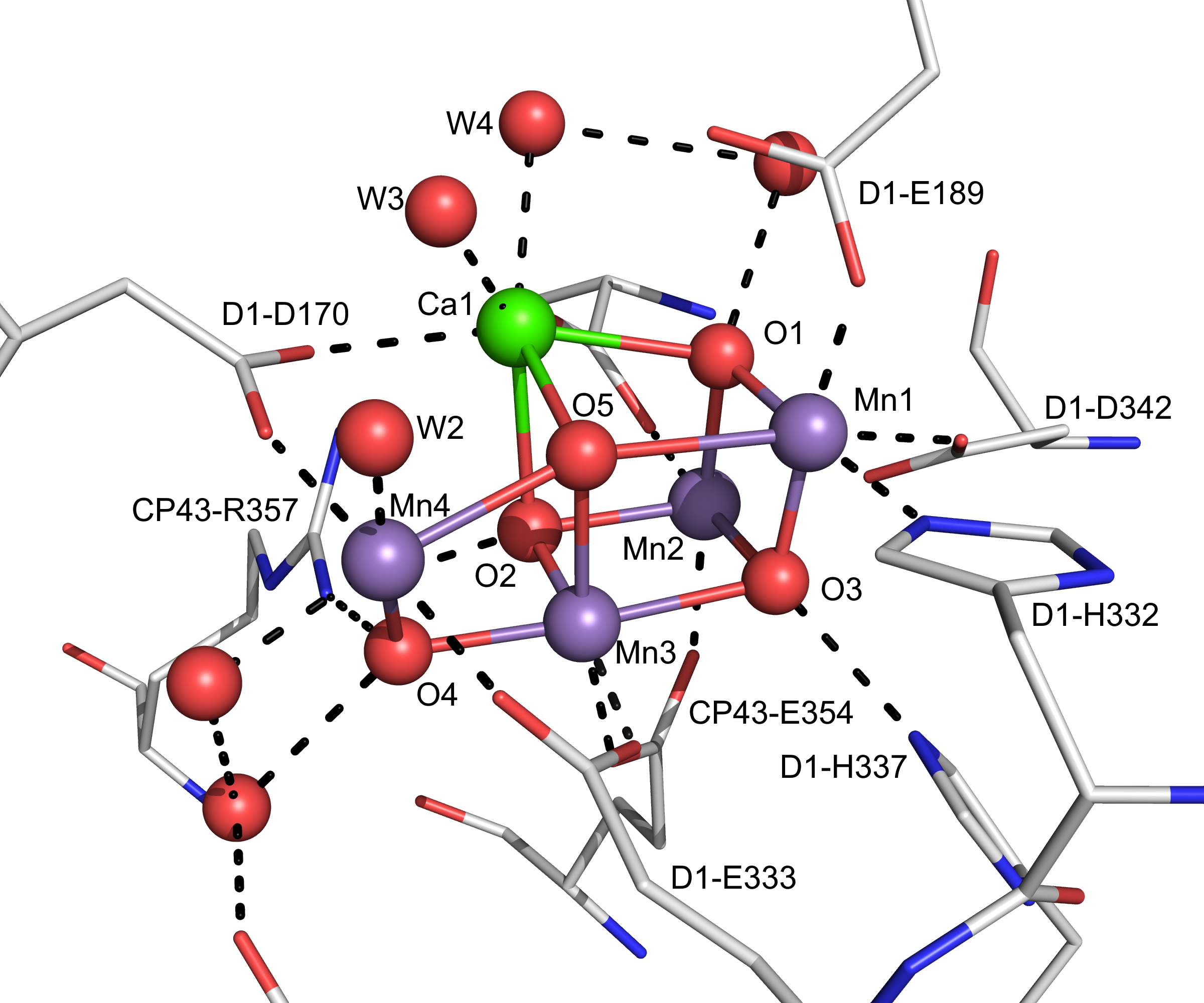
X-ray crystal structure of the Mn_{4}O_{5}Ca core of the oxygen evolving complex of photosystem II at a resolution of 1.9 Å.

== The "oxo wall" ==
Qualitative molecular orbital diagram of a d^{0} metal-oxo fragment (empty metal d orbitals in an octahedral field on left, full oxygen p orbitals on right). Here it can be seen that d^{1} and d^{2} electrons fill a nonbonding orbital and electrons d^{3} to d^{6} fill anti-bonding orbitals, which destabilize the complex.

The term "oxo wall" is a theory used to describe the fact that no terminal oxo complexes are known for metal centers with octahedral symmetry and d-electron counts beyond 5.

Oxo compounds for the vanadium through iron triads (groups 3 to 8) are well known, whereas terminal oxo compounds for metals in the cobalt through zinc triads (groups 9 to 12) are rare and invariably feature metals with coordination numbers lower than 6. This trend holds for other metal-ligand multiple bonds. Claimed exceptions to this rule have been retracted.

The iridium oxo complex Ir(O)(mesityl)_{3} may appear to be an exception to the oxo-wall rule, but it is not because the complex is non-octahedral. The trigonal symmetry reorders the metal d-orbitals below the degenerate MO π* pair. In three-fold symmetric complexes, multiple MO bonding is allowed for as many as 7 d-electrons.

Terminal oxo ligands are also rather rare for the titanium triad, especially zirconium and hafnium, and are unknown for group 3 metals (scandium, yttrium, and lanthanum).

== See also ==
- Metal-ligand multiple bond
- Oxide
- Polyoxometalate
- Metallate
- Oxophilic
- Dioxygen complex
