= Formate dehydrogenase =

Formate dehydrogenase N, transmembrane
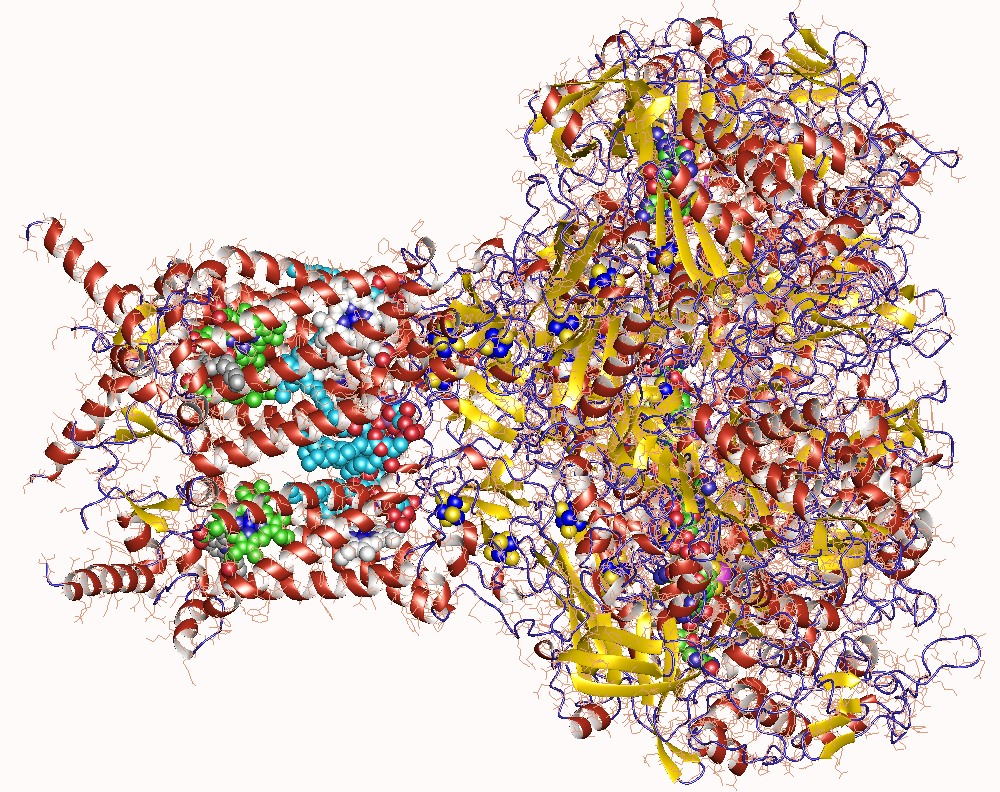
- Formate dehydrogenase-N hetero9mer, E.Coli

Identifiers
- Symbol: Form-deh_trans
- Pfam: PF09163
- InterPro: IPR015246
- SCOP2: 1kqf / SCOPe / SUPFAM
- OPM superfamily: 3
- OPM protein: 1kqf
Available protein structures:
- Pfam: structures / ECOD
- PDB: RCSB PDB; PDBe; PDBj
- PDBsum: structure summary
- PDB: 1kqfB:246-289 1kqgB:246-289

Formate dehydrogenases are a set of enzymes that catalyse the oxidation of formate to carbon dioxide, donating the electrons to a second substrate, such as NAD^{+} in formate:NAD+ oxidoreductase (EC 1.17.1.9) or to a cytochrome in formate:ferricytochrome-b1 oxidoreductase (EC 1.2.2.1). This family of enzymes has attracted attention as inspiration or guidance on methods for the carbon dioxide fixation, relevant to global warming.

== Function ==
NAD-dependent formate dehydrogenases are important in methylotrophic yeast and bacteria, being vital in the catabolism of C1 compounds such as methanol. The cytochrome-dependent enzymes are more important in anaerobic metabolism in prokaryotes. For example, in E. coli, the formate:ferricytochrome-b1 oxidoreductase is an intrinsic membrane protein with two subunits and is involved in anaerobic nitrate respiration.

NAD-dependent reaction

Formate + NAD^{+} ⇌ CO_{2} + NADH + H^{+}

Cytochrome-dependent reaction

Formate + 2 ferricytochrome b1 ⇌ CO_{2} + 2 ferrocytochrome b1 + 2 H^{+}

== Molybdopterin, molybdenum and selenium dependence ==
The metal-dependent Fdh's feature Mo or W at their active sites. These active sites resemble the motif seen in DMSO reductase, with two molybdopterin cofactors bound to Mo/W in a bidentate fashion. The fifth and sixth ligands are sulfide and either cysteinate or selenocysteinate.

The mechanism of action appears to involve 2e redox of the metal centers, induced by hydride transfer from formate and release of carbon dioxide:

S=M^{VI}(Scys)(SR)_{4} + HCO^{−}_{2} ⇌ HS−M^{IV}(Scys)(SR)_{4} + CO_{2}
S=M^{VI}(Secys)(SR)_{4} + HCO^{−}_{2} ⇌ HS−M^{IV}(Secys)(SR)_{4} + CO_{2}

In this scheme, (SR)_{4} represents the four thiolate-like ligands provided by the two dithiolene cofactors, the molybdopterins. The dithiolene and cysteinyl/selenocysteinyl ligands are redox-innocent. In terms of the molecular details, the mechanism remains uncertain, despite numerous investigations. Most mechanisms assume that formate does not coordinate to Mo/W, in contrast to typical Mo/W oxo-transferases (e.g., DMSO reductase). A popular mechanistic proposal entails transfer of H^{−} from formate to the Mo/W^{VI}=S group.

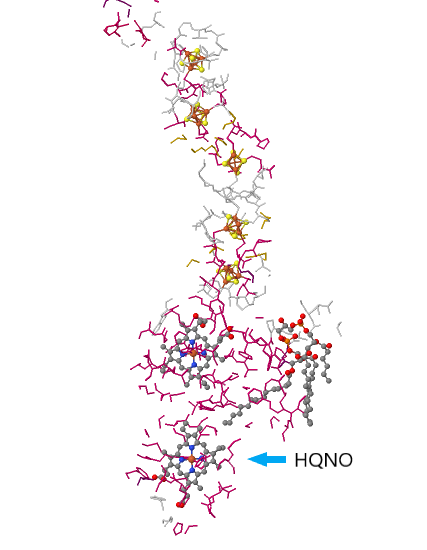
Formate Dehydrogenase (PDB 1KQF, 1.6 A resolution, from E. coli); overall view of the electron transport chain showing the [Fe4S4] clusters in the periplasmic alpha and beta subunits, and the cytoplasmic gamma subunit showing the Fe(heme b)P and the Fe-(heme b)C menoquinone binding site where an HQNO ligand is bound close the Fe(heme b)C. Atom colours: Fe = orange, S = yellow, C = grey, O = red, N = blue.

== Transmembrane domain ==
Formate dehydrogenase consists of two transmembrane domains; three α-helices of the β-subunit and four transmembrane helices from the gamma-subunit.

The β-subunit of formate dehydrogenase is present in the periplasm with a single transmembrane α-helix spanning the membrane by anchoring the β-subunit to the inner-membrane surface. The β-subunit has two subdomains, where each subdomain has two [4Fe-4S] ferredoxin clusters. The judicious alignment of the [4Fe-4S] clusters in a chain through the subunit have low separation distances, which allow rapid electron flow through [4Fe-4S]-1, [4Fe-4S]-4, [4Fe-4S]-2, and [4Fe-4S]-3 to the periplasmic heme b in the γ-subunit. The electron flow is then directed across the membrane to a cytoplasmic heme b in the γ-subunit .

The γ-subunit of formate dehydrogenase is a membrane-bound cytochrome b consisting of four transmembrane helices and two heme b groups which produce a four-helix bundle which aids in heme binding. The heme b cofactors bound to the gamma subunit allow for the hopping of electrons through the subunit. The transmembrane helices maintain both heme b groups, while only three provide the heme ligands thereby anchoring Fe-heme. The periplasmic heme b group accepts electrons from [4Fe-4S]-3 clusters of the β-subunit’s periplasmic domain. The cytoplasmic heme b group accepts electrons from the periplasmic heme b group, where electron flow is then directed towards the menaquinone (vitamin K) reduction site, present in the transmembrane domain of the gamma subunit. The menaquinone reduction site in the γ-subunit, accepts electrons through the binding of a histidine ligand of the cytoplasmic heme b.

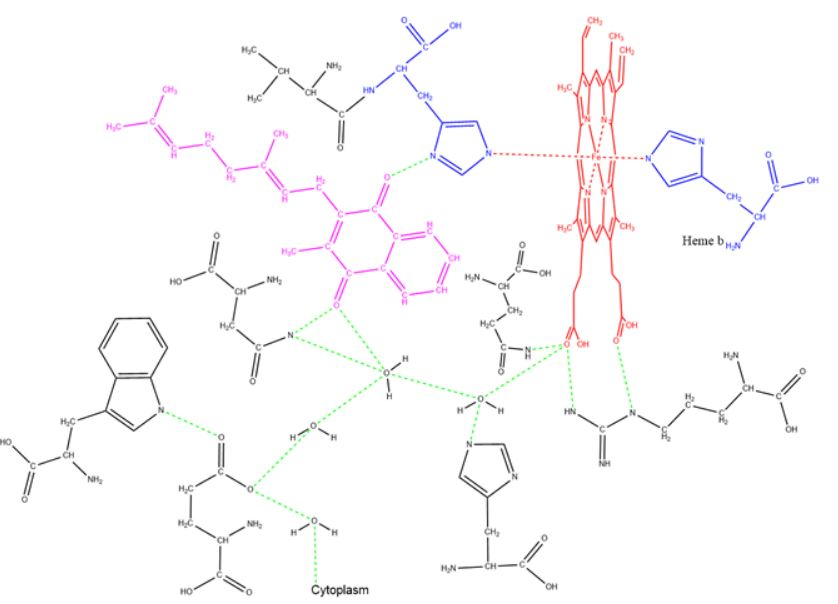
Menaquinone binding site alongside proposed water proton pathway

== See also ==
- Formate dehydrogenase (cytochrome)
- Formate dehydrogenase (cytochrome-c-553)
- Formate dehydrogenase (NADP+)
- Microbial metabolism

== Additional reading ==
- Ferry JG (1990). "Formate dehydrogenase". FEMS Microbiol. Rev. 7 (3–4): 377–82. doi:10.1111/j.1574-6968.1990.tb04940.x. PMID 2094290.
