= Dimethyl sulfide:cytochrome c2 reductase =

Identifiers
- EC no.: 1.8.2.4

Databases
- IntEnz: IntEnz view
- BRENDA: BRENDA entry
- ExPASy: NiceZyme view
- KEGG: KEGG entry
- MetaCyc: metabolic pathway
- PRIAM: profile
- PDB structures: RCSB PDB PDBe PDBsum
Search
- PMC: articles
- PubMed: articles
- NCBI: proteins

Dimethyl sulfide:cytochrome c2 reductase (EC 1.8.2.4) is an enzyme with systematic name dimethyl sulfide:cytochrome-c2 oxidoreductase. It is also known by the name dimethylsulfide dehydrogenase (Ddh). This enzyme catalyses the following chemical reaction

dimethyl sulfide + 2 ferricytochrome c2 + H_{2}O $\rightleftharpoons$ dimethyl sulfoxide + 2 ferrocytochrome c2 + 2 H^{+}

The enzyme from the bacterium Rhodovulum sulfidophilum binds molybdopterin guanine dinucleotide, heme b and [4Fe-4S] clusters. It is a heterotrimeric protein with three subunits, the Molybdopterin DdhA (Q8GPG4), the [4Fe-4S] DdhB (Q8GPG3), and the heme-binding DdhC (Q8GPG1). The subunits share homology with other DMSO reductase family enzymes; one example with all three subunits mapped is ethylbenzene hydroxylase from Aromatoleum aromaticum (PDB: 2ivf).
