= Nitrate reductase =

Class of enzymes

nitrate reductase
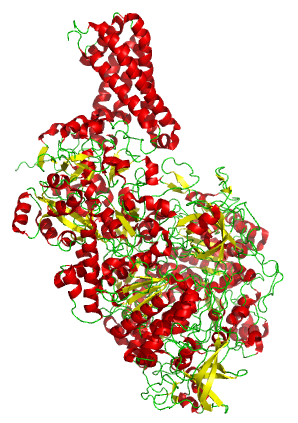
- structure of nitrate reductase A from E. coli

Identifiers
- EC no.: 1.7.99.4
- CAS no.: 9013-03-0

Databases
- BRENDA: enzyme data
- ExPASy: NiceZyme view
- KEGG: enzyme entry
- MetaCyc: metabolic pathway
- Rhea: reactions
- PDB structures: RCSB PDB PDBe PDBsum
- Gene Ontology: AmiGO / QuickGO
Search
- PMC: articles
- PubMed: articles
- NCBI: proteins

Molybdopterin oxidoreductase (nitrate reductase alpha subunit)

Identifiers
- Symbol: Molybdopterin
- Pfam: PF00384
- InterPro: IPR006656
- PROSITE: PDOC00392
- SCOP2: 1cxs / SCOPe / SUPFAM
- OPM superfamily: 3
- OPM protein: 1kqf
Available protein structures:
- PDB: IPR006656 PF00384 (ECOD; PDBsum)
- AlphaFold: IPR006656; PF00384

4Fe-4S dicluster domain (nitrate reductase beta subunit)

Identifiers
- Symbol: Fer4_11
- Pfam: PF13247
Available protein structures:
- PDB: PF13247 (ECOD; PDBsum)
- AlphaFold: PF13247

Nitrate reductase gamma subunit

Identifiers
- Symbol: Nitrate_red_gam
- Pfam: PF02665
- InterPro: IPR003816
- SCOP2: 1q16 / SCOPe / SUPFAM
- TCDB: 5.A.3
- OPM superfamily: 3
- OPM protein: 1q16
Available protein structures:
- PDB: IPR003816 PF02665 (ECOD; PDBsum)
- AlphaFold: IPR003816; PF02665

Nitrate reductase delta subunit

Identifiers
- Symbol: Nitrate_red_del
- Pfam: PF02613
- InterPro: IPR003765
Available protein structures:
- PDB: IPR003765 PF02613 (ECOD; PDBsum)
- AlphaFold: IPR003765; PF02613

Nitrate reductase cytochrome c-type subunit (NapB)

Identifiers
- Symbol: NapB
- Pfam: PF03892
- InterPro: IPR005591
- SCOP2: 1jni / SCOPe / SUPFAM
Available protein structures:
- PDB: IPR005591 PF03892 (ECOD; PDBsum)
- AlphaFold: IPR005591; PF03892

Periplasmic nitrate reductase protein NapE

Identifiers
- Symbol: NapE
- Pfam: PF06796
- InterPro: IPR010649
Available protein structures:
- PDB: IPR010649 PF06796 (ECOD; PDBsum)
- AlphaFold: IPR010649; PF06796

Nitrate reductases are molybdoenzymes that reduce nitrate (NO^{−}_{3}) to nitrite (NO^{−}_{2}). This reaction is critical for the production of protein in most crop plants, as nitrate is the predominant source of nitrogen in fertilized soils.

== Types ==
=== Eukaryotic ===
Eukaryotic nitrate reductases are part of the sulfite oxidase family of molybdoenzymes. They transfer electrons from NADH or NADPH to nitrate.

=== Prokaryotic ===
Prokaryotic nitrate reductases belong to the DMSO reductase family of molybdoenzymes and have been classified into three groups, assimilatory nitrate reductases (Nas), respiratory nitrate reductase (Nar), and periplasmic nitrate reductases (Nap). The active site of these enzymes is a molybdenum ion that is bound to the four thiolate functional groups of two pterin molecules. The coordination sphere of the molybdenum ion is completed by one amino-acid side chain and oxygen and/or sulfur ligands. In Nap, the molybdenum is covalently attached to the protein by a cysteine side chain, and an aspartate side chain in Nar.

== Structure ==
Prokaryotic nitrate reductases have two major types, transmembrane nitrate reductases (NAR) and periplasmic nitrate reductases (NAP). NAR allows for proton translocation across the cellular membrane and can contribute to the generation of ATP by the proton motive force. NAP cannot do so.

The transmembrane respiratory nitrate reductase is composed of three subunits; an 1 alpha, 1 beta and 2 gamma. It can substitute for the NRA enzyme in Escherichia coli, allowing it to use nitrate as an electron acceptor for anaerobic respiration. A transmembrane nitrate reductase that can function as a proton pump (similar to the case of anaerobic respiration) has been discovered in the diatom Thalassiosira weissflogii.

The nitrate reductase of higher plants, algae, and fungi is a homodimeric cytosolic protein with five conserved domains in each monomer: 1) an Mo-MPT domain that contains the single molybdopterin cofactor, 2) a dimer interface domain, 3) a cytochrome b domain, and 4) an NADH-binding domain that combines with 5) an FAD-binding domain to form the cytochrome b reductase fragment. There exists a Glycophosphatidylinositol-anchored variant that is found on the outer face of the plasma membrane. Its function is not clear.

== Mechanism ==
In prokaryotic periplasmic nitrate reductase, the nitrate anion binds to Mo(IV). Oxygen transfer yields an Mo(VI) oxo intermediate with release of nitrite. Reduction of the Mo oxide and protonolysis removes the oxo group, regenerating Mo(IV).

Similar to the prokaryotic nitrate reduction mechanism, in eukaryotic nitrate reductase, an oxygen in nitrate binds to Mo in the +4 oxidation state, displacing a hydroxide ion. Then the Mo d-orbital electrons flip over, creating a multiple bond between Mo(VI) and that oxygen, ejecting nitrite. The Mo(VI) double bond to oxygen is reduced by NAD(P)H passed through the intramolecular transport chain.

== Regulation ==
Nitrate reductase (NR) is regulated at the transcriptional and translational levels induced by light, nitrate, and possibly a negative feedback mechanism. First, nitrate assimilation is initiated by the uptake of nitrate from the root system, reduced to nitrite by nitrate reductase, and then nitrite is reduced to ammonia by nitrite reductase. Ammonia then goes into the GS-GOGAT pathway to be incorporated into amino acids. When the plant is under stress, instead of reducing nitrate via NR to be incorporated into amino acids, the nitrate is reduced to nitric oxide which can have many damaging effects on the plant. Thus, the importance of regulating nitrate reductase activity is to limit the amount of nitric oxide being produced.

=== Inactivation of nitrate reductase ===
The inactivation of nitrate reductase has many steps and many different signals that aid in the inactivation of the enzyme. Specifically in spinach, the very first step of nitrate reductase inactivation is the phosphorylation of NR on the 543-serine residue. The very last step of nitrate reductase inactivation is the binding of the 14-3-3 adapter protein, which is initiated by the presence of Mg^{2+} and Ca^{2+}. Higher plants and some algae post-translationally regulate NR by phosphorylation of serine residues and subsequent binding of a 14-3-3 protein.

=== Anoxic conditions ===
Studies were done measuring the nitrate uptake and nitrate reductase activity in anoxic conditions to see if there was a difference in activity level and tolerance to anoxia. These studies found that nitrate reductase, in anoxic conditions improves the plants tolerance to being less aerated. This increased activity of nitrate reductase was also related to an increase in nitrite release in the roots. The results of this study showed that the dramatic increase in nitrate reductase in anoxic conditions can be directly attributed to the anoxic conditions inducing the dissociation of 14-3-3 protein from NR and the dephosphorylation of the nitrate reductase.

== Applications ==
Nitrate reductase activity can be used as a biochemical tool for predicting grain yield and grain protein production.

Nitrate reductase can be used to test nitrate concentrations in biofluids.

Nitrate reductase promotes amino acid production in tea leaves. Under south Indian conditions, it is reported that tea plants sprayed with various micronutrients (like Zn, Mn and B) along with Mo enhanced the amino acid content of tea shoots and also the crop yield.
