= 6-Hydroxypseudooxynicotine dehydrogenase =

Class of enzymes

6-hydroxypseudooxynicotine dehydrogenase

Identifiers
- EC no.: 1.5.99.14

Databases
- IntEnz: IntEnz view
- BRENDA: BRENDA entry
- ExPASy: NiceZyme view
- KEGG: KEGG entry
- MetaCyc: metabolic pathway
- PRIAM: profile
- PDB structures: RCSB PDB PDBe PDBsum
Search
- PMC: articles
- PubMed: articles
- NCBI: proteins

6-hydroxypseudooxynicotine dehydrogenase (EC 1.5.99.14) is an enzyme with systematic name 1-(6-hydroxypyridin-3-yl)-4-(methylamino)butan-1-one:acceptor 6-oxidoreductase (hydroxylating). This enzyme catalyses the following chemical reaction:

1-(6-hydroxypyridin-3-yl)-4-(methylamino)butan-1-one + acceptor + H_{2}O $\rightleftharpoons$ 1-(2,6-dihydroxypyridin-3-yl)-4-(methylamino)butan-1-one + reduced acceptor

This enzyme contains a cytidylyl molybdenum cofactor.
