= Trivanadium sulfide =

Identifiers
3D model (JSmol)	Interactive image
- InChI: InChI=1S/H2S.3V/h1H2;;; Key: NMOVDEZJWXXIAF-UHFFFAOYSA-N
- SMILES: [S].[V].[V].[V]

Properties
Chemical formula	SV_{3}
Molar mass	184.88 g·mol^{−1}
Appearance	metallic needles
Melting point	1,360 °C (2,480 °F; 1,630 K)
- Except where otherwise noted, data are given for materials in their standard state (at 25 °C [77 °F], 100 kPa). Infobox references

Trivanadium sulfide is a metal rich sulfide of vanadium with chemical formula V_{3}S. It is metallic in appearance and conductivity.

== Properties ==
V_{3}S melts around 1360°C.

V_{3}S forms a eutectic mixture with vanadium with a composition in atom %: V 82.2%, S 17.8% melting at 1312°C. Although metallic, V_{3}S is not known to be a superconductor.

== Structure ==
V_{3}S is dimorphous.

=== Alpha form ===
The alpha form α-V_{3}S is stable over 950°C but can be quenched to a metastable state at room temperature. The crystals form in the body-centred tetragonal system with space group I4̅2m with the unit cell dimensions: a = 9.470 c = 5.589 Å and unit cell volume of 501.2 Å^{3} with eight formula units per cell. Its density is 5.895 tonnes/m^{3}.

α-V_{3}S is the prototype for a crystal structure type that includes AuPb_{3}, Zr_{3}Ir, Mo_{3}P, and Ta_{3}P.

=== Beta form ===
The beta form β-V_{3}S is stable below 825°C. The crystals form in the tetragonal system with space group P4_{2}/nbc with the unit cell dimensions a = 9.381 c = 5.939 Å, also with eight formulae per unit cell. Density is 5.939 tonnes/m^{3}.

β-V_{3}S is the prototype for a crystal structure type that includes Ta_{3}P.
