= Water oxidation catalysis =

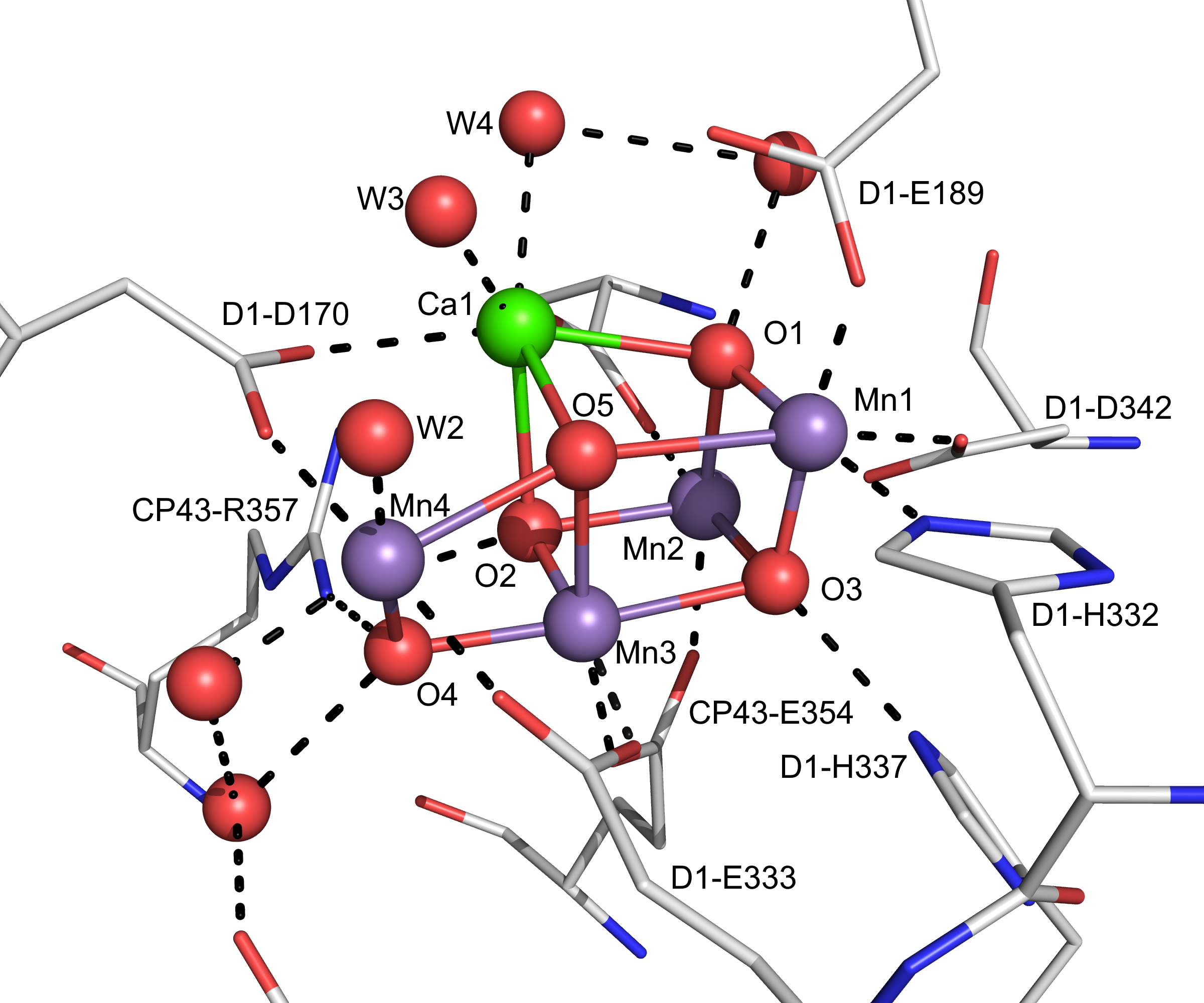
X-ray Crystal structure of the Mn_{4}O_{5}Ca core of the oxygen evolving complex of Photosystem II at a resolution of 1.9 Å.

Water oxidation catalysis (WOC) is the acceleration (catalysis) of the conversion of water into oxygen and protons:

2 H_{2}O → 4 H^{+} + 4 e^{−} + O_{2}

Many catalysts are effective, both homogeneous catalysts and heterogeneous catalysts. The oxygen evolving complex in photosynthesis is the premier example. There is no interest in generating oxygen by water oxidation since oxygen is readily obtained from air. Instead, interest in water oxidation is motivated by its relevance to water splitting, which would provide "solar hydrogen," i.e. water oxidation would generate the electrons and protons for the production of hydrogen. An ideal WOC would operate rapidly at low overpotential, exhibit high stability and be of low cost, derived from nontoxic components.

== Mechanistic and energetic principles ==
Water is more difficult to oxidize than its conjugate base hydroxide. Hydroxide is stabilized by coordination to metal cations. Some metal hydroxides, those featuring redox-active metal centers, can be oxidized to give metal oxo complexes. Attack of water on metal oxo centers represents one pathway for the formation of the O-O bond, leading to dioxygen. Alternatively, the crucial O-O bond forming step can arise by coupling suitably positioned pairs of metal hydroxo centers. The molecular mechanism of the OEC has not been elucidated.

The conversion of even metal hydroxo complexes to O_{2} requires very strong oxidants. In photosynthesis, such oxidants are provided by electron holes on porphyrin radical cations. For device applications, the aspirational oxidant is a photovoltaic material. For screening WOCs, ceric ammonium nitrate is a typical electron acceptor.

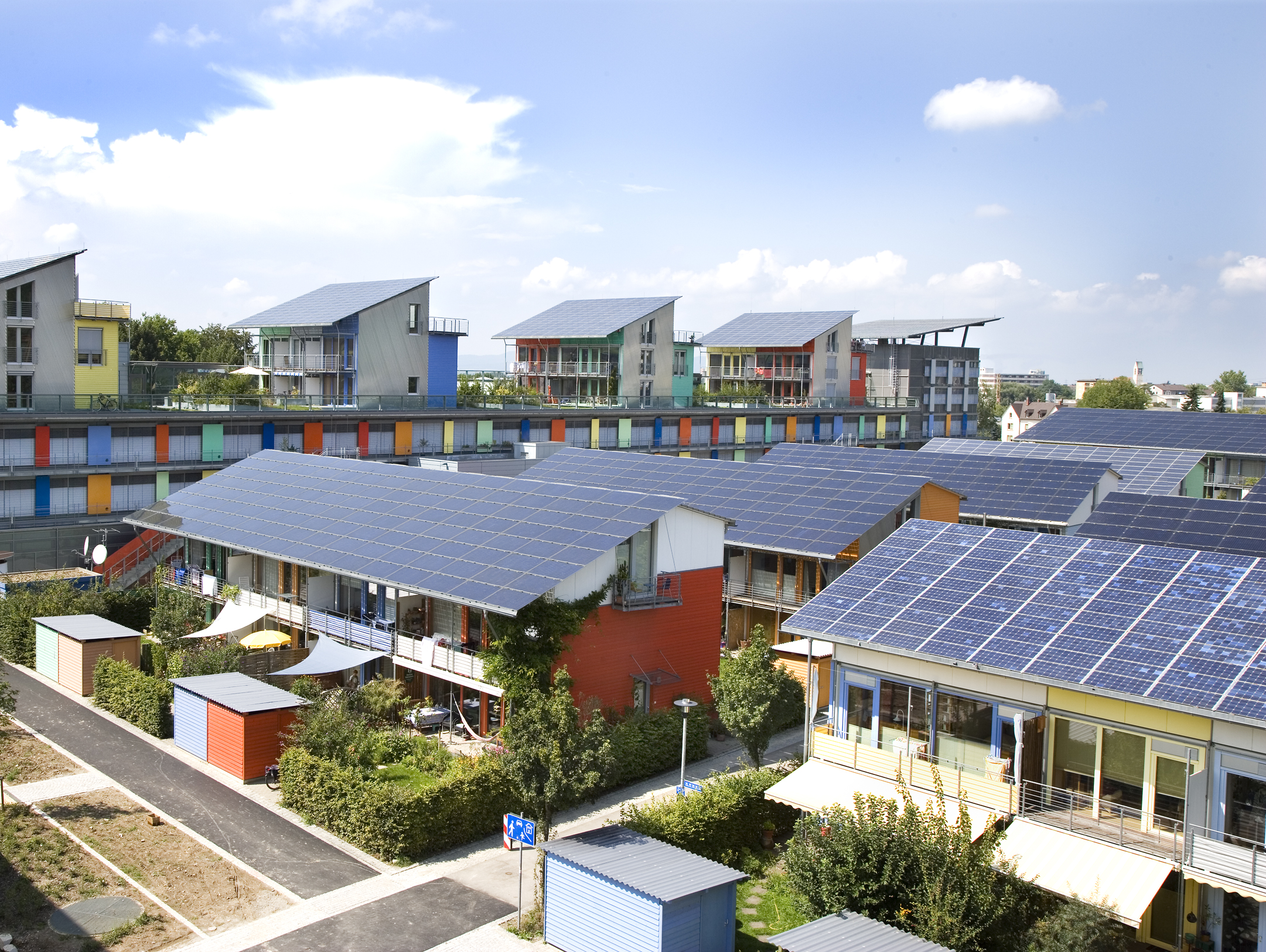
Solar panels are the aspirational power sources for driving water splitting, including water oxidation catalysis.

== Homogeneous catalysis ==
=== Ruthenium complexes ===
A number of ruthenium-aqua complexes catalyze the oxidation of water. Most catalysts feature bipyridine and terpyridine ligands. Catalysts containing pyridine-2-carboxylate exhibit rates (300 s^{−1}) comparable to that of photosystem II. Work in this area has ushered in many new polypyridyl ligands.

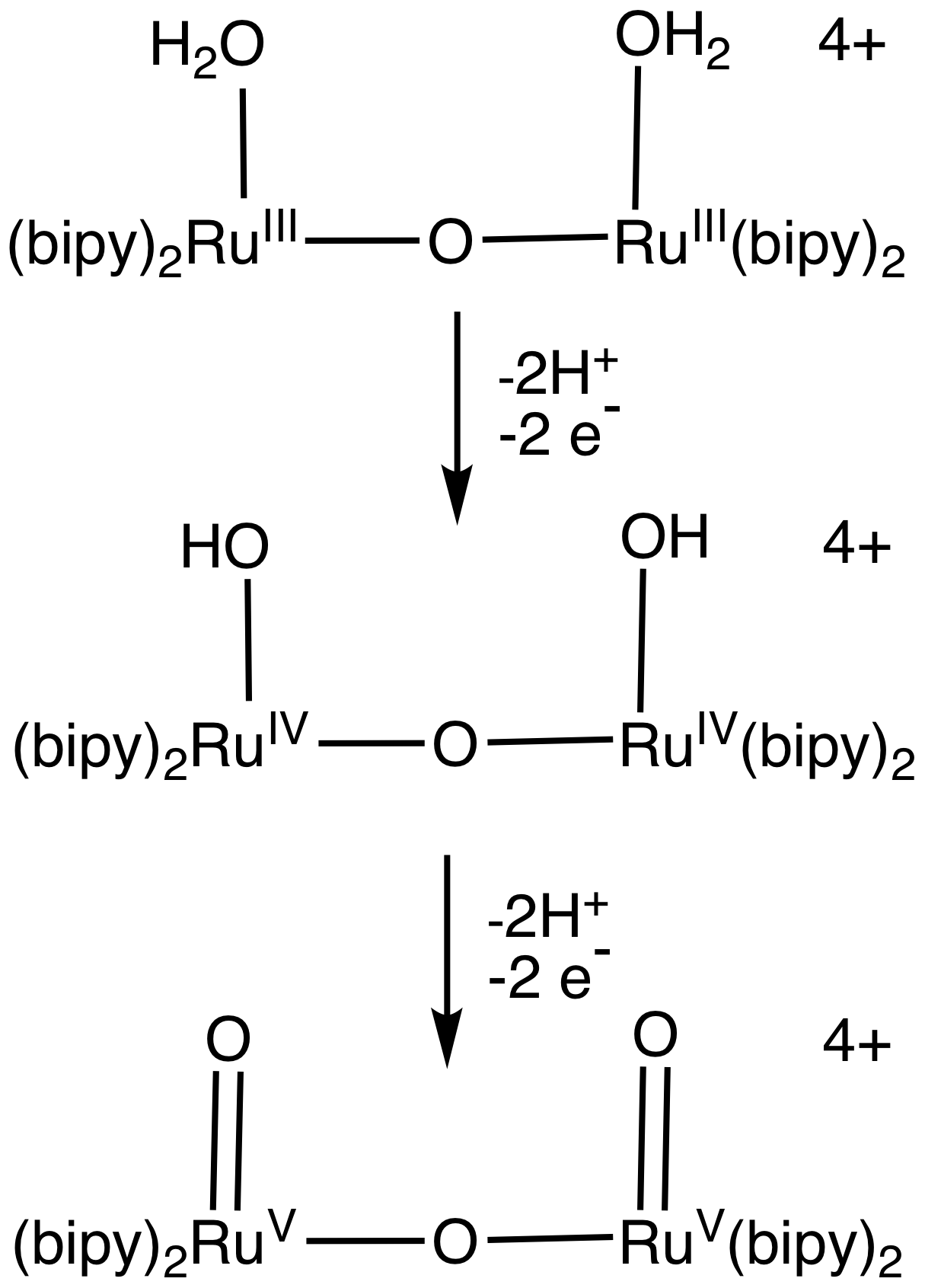
The "blue dimer" {[Ru(bipyridine)_{2}(OH_{2})]_{2}O}^{4+} and two derivatives are catalysts (and intermediates) in water oxidation.

=== Cobalt and iron complexes ===
Early examples of cobalt-based WOCs suffered from instability. A homogeneous WOC [Co(py)_{5}(H_{2}O)](ClO_{4})_{2} operates by a proton-coupled electron transfer to form a [Co^{III}--OH]^{2+} species, which on further oxidation forms a Co^{IV} intermediate. The intermediate formed reacts with water to liberate O_{2}. The cobalt-polyoxometalate complex [Co_{4}(H_{2}O)_{2}(α-PW_{9}O_{34})_{2}]^{10−} is highly efficient WOC.

Some iron complexes catalyze water oxidation. A water-soluble complex [Fe(OTf)_{2}(Me_{2}Pytacn)] (Pytacn=pyridine-substituted trimethyltriazacyclononane; OTf= triflate) is an efficient WOC. The concentration of the catalyst and the oxidant were found to be strongly affecting the oxidation process. Many related complexes with cis labile sites are active catalysts. Most complexes were found to undergo degradation in a few hours. Higher stability of the molecular catalyst may be achieved using robust clathrochelate ligands that stabilize high oxidation states of iron and prevent rapid degradation of the catalyst. The number and stereochemistry of reactive coordination sites on Fe have been evaluated but few guidelines have emerged.

=== Iridium complexes ===
The complexes [Ir(ppy)_{2}(OH_{2})_{2}]^{+} (ppy = 2-phenylpyridine) exhibit high turnover numbers, but low catalytic rates. Replacing ppy with Cp* (C_{5}Me_{5}) results in increased catalytic activity but decreased the turnover number. Water nucleophilic attack on Ir=O species was found to be responsible for the O_{2} formation.

== Heterogeneous catalysis ==
Iridium oxide is a stable bulk WOC catalyst with low overpotential.

Ni-based oxide film liberates oxygen in quasi-neutral conditions at an overpotential of ~425 mV and shows long lasting stability. X-ray spectroscopy revealed the presence of di-μ-oxide bridging between Ni^{III}/Ni^{IV} ions but no evidence of mono-μ-oxide bridging was found between the ions. Similar structures can be found in Co-WOC films and Mn-WOC catalysts.

Cobalt oxides (Co_{3}O_{4}) have been investigated to work on the same pattern as other cobalt salts. Cobalt phosphates are also active WOCs at neutral pH. Stable and highly active WOCs can be prepared by adsorbing Co^{II} on silica nanoparticles.

The spinel compounds are also very efficient in oxidizing water. When nanodimensional spinels are coated over the carbon materials hydrothermally, followed by a further reduction, can exhibit high efficiency in splitting the water electrochemically.

== Additional reviews ==
- Balzani, V.; Credi, A.; Venturi, M., Photochemical Conversion of Solar Energy. ChemSusChem 2008, 1, 26–58.
- Sala, X.; Romero, I.; Rodríguez, M.; Escriche, L.; Llobet, A., Molecular Catalysts that Oxidize Water to Dioxygen. Angewandte Chemie International Edition 2009, 48, 2842–2852.
- Gratzel, M., Photoelectrochemical cells. Nature 2001, 414, 338–344.
- Eisenberg, R.; Gray, H. B., Preface on Making Oxygen. Inorganic Chemistry 2008, 47, 1697–1699.
- Sun, L.; Hammarstrom, L.; Akermark, B.; Styring, S., Towards artificial photosynthesis: ruthenium-manganese chemistry for energy production. Chemical Society Reviews 2001, 30, 36–49.
- Gust, D.; Moore, T. A.; Moore, A. L., Solar Fuels via Artificial Photosynthesis. Accounts of Chemical Research 2009, 42, 1890–1898.
