= Ethylbenzene hydroxylase =

Ethylbenzene hydroxylase (Ethylbenzene dehydrogenase)

Identifiers
- EC no.: 1.17.99.2

Databases
- IntEnz: IntEnz view
- BRENDA: BRENDA entry
- ExPASy: NiceZyme view
- KEGG: KEGG entry
- MetaCyc: metabolic pathway
- PRIAM: profile
- PDB structures: RCSB PDB PDBe PDBsum
Search
- PMC: articles
- PubMed: articles
- NCBI: proteins

Ethylbenzene hydroxylase (EC 1.17.99.2) is an enzyme that catalyzes the chemical reaction

ethylbenzene
+ electron
acceptor
H_{2}O
(S)-1-phenylethanol
+ reduced
acceptor

The three substrates of this enzyme are ethylbenzene, water, and an electron acceptor. Its products are (S)-1-phenylethanol and the reduced acceptor.

This enzyme is an oxidoreductase, specifically those acting on CH or CH_{2} groups with other acceptors. The systematic name of this enzyme class is ethylbenzene:acceptor oxidoreductase. Other names in common use include ethylbenzene dehydrogenase, and ethylbenzene:(acceptor) oxidoreductase. This enzyme participates in ethylbenzene degradation by Aromatoleum aromaticum, a denitrifying bacterium related to the genera Azoarcus and Thauera. It is a molybdenum enzyme belonging to the DMSO reductase family. Molybdenum enzymes are distinguished by the presence of a unique active site containing molybdenum atom, one or two molybdopterins and additional ligands (i.e. aminoacid residue of Ser, Cys, SeCys or Asp and very often oxygen Mo=O ligand). EBDH is synthesized exclusively in cells grown anaerobically on ethylbenzene and has been identified as a soluble periplasmic protein.

== Structural studies ==
As of late 2007, only one structure has been solved for this class of enzymes, with the PDB accession code 2IVF. EBDH consists of three subunits of 96, 43, and 23 kDa, and contains a molybdenum cofactor and a heme b559 cofactor linked by a linear row of five iron-sulfur clusters.

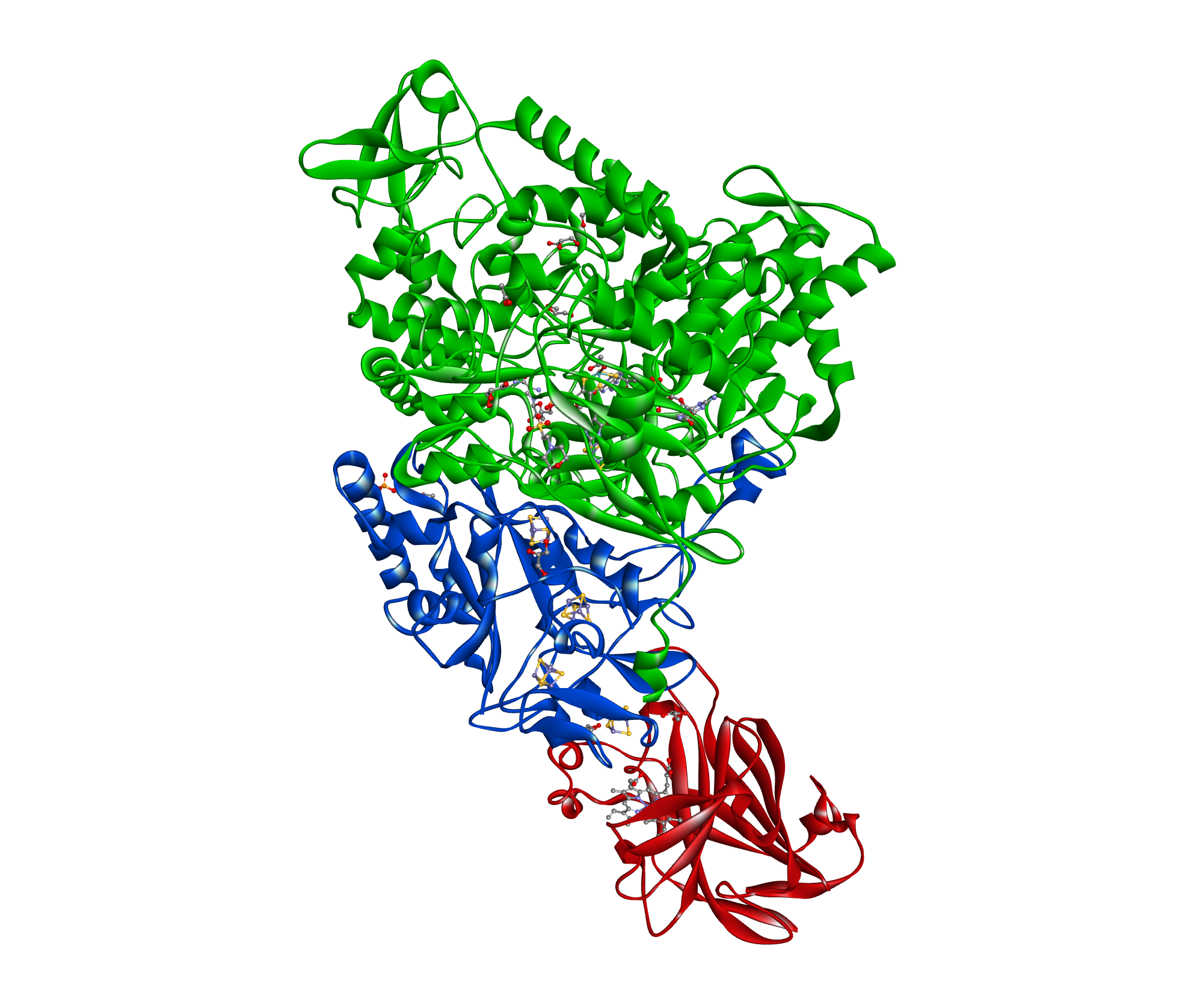
Structure of ethylbenzene dehydrogenase

== Mechanism ==
The reaction is catalyzed by the enzyme using a molybdenum cofactor (MoCo), which in the native state consists of a molybdenum (VI) nucleus ligated by two molybdopterin guanine dinucleotide (MGD) ligands and an aspartic acid residue. Two electrons acquired by the cofactor during the reaction, i.e., the hydroxylation of the hydrocarbon, are then transferred via a chain of iron-sulfur clusters connecting the molybdenum with a heme b cofactor in the alpha subunit, from which the electrons are donated to a yet-unknown acceptor. Notably, EBDH exhibits in vitro activity only with artificial electron acceptors of high redox potential, like the ferricenium ion (E0’= +380 mV). This suggests that its natural electron acceptor may be a periplasmic cytochrome c of similarly high potential, which would couple the ethylbenzene oxidation to the nitrate respiration of A. aromaticum.

The EBDH catalytic cycle has two parts: i) oxidation part, where substrate is oxidized to alcohols and the enzyme is reduced to its catalytically inactive form, and ii) enzyme re-oxidation part, where EBDH active site (MoCo) is oxidized and restored to its catalytically active form.

Theoretical and experimental studies point toward radical C-H activation as the initial reaction and rate limiting step. A possible alternative hydride transfer seems to be less likely. The mechanism concludes with conversion of the hydrocarbon to a carbocation intermediate and rebound of a hydroxide to form the hydroxylated product. Moreover, a histidine residue (His192) of the active site seems to be involved in the reaction mechanism.
