= Aldehyde ferredoxin oxidoreductase =

Identifiers
- EC no.: 1.2.7.5
- CAS no.: 138066-90-7

Databases
- IntEnz: IntEnz view
- BRENDA: BRENDA entry
- ExPASy: NiceZyme view
- KEGG: KEGG entry
- MetaCyc: metabolic pathway
- PRIAM: profile
- PDB structures: RCSB PDB PDBe PDBsum
Search
- PMC: articles
- PubMed: articles
- NCBI: proteins

AFOR_N
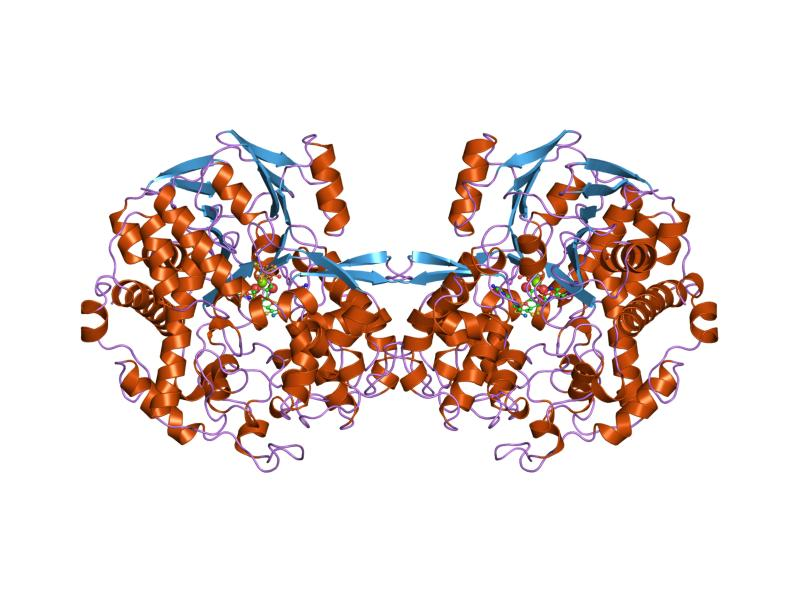
- structure of a hyperthermophilic tungstopterin enzyme, aldehyde ferredoxin oxidoreductase

Identifiers
- Symbol: AFOR_N
- Pfam: PF02730
- InterPro: IPR013983
- SCOP2: 1aor / SCOPe / SUPFAM
Available protein structures:
- Pfam: structures / ECOD
- PDB: RCSB PDB; PDBe; PDBj
- PDBsum: structure summary

AFOR_C

Identifiers
- Symbol: AFOR_C
- Pfam: PF01314
- InterPro: IPR001203
- SCOP2: 1aor / SCOPe / SUPFAM
Available protein structures:
- Pfam: structures / ECOD
- PDB: RCSB PDB; PDBe; PDBj
- PDBsum: structure summary

In enzymology, an aldehyde ferredoxin oxidoreductase (EC 1.2.7.5) is an enzyme that catalyzes the chemical reaction

an aldehyde + H_{2}O + 2 oxidized ferredoxin ⇌ an acid + 3 H^{+} + 2 reduced ferredoxin

This enzyme belongs to the family of oxidoreductases, specifically those acting on the aldehyde or oxo group of donor with an iron-sulfur protein as acceptor. The systematic name of this enzyme class is aldehyde:ferredoxin oxidoreductase. This enzyme is also called AOR. It is a relatively rare example of a tungsten-containing protein.

== Occurrence ==
The active site of the AOR family feature an oxo-tungsten center bound to a pair of molybdopterin cofactors (which does not contain molybdenum) and an 4Fe-4S cluster. This family includes AOR, formaldehyde ferredoxin oxidoreductase (FOR), glyceraldehyde-3-phosphate ferredoxin oxidoreductase (GAPOR), all isolated from hyperthermophilic archea; carboxylic acid reductase found in clostridia; and hydroxycarboxylate viologen oxidoreductase from Proteus vulgaris, the sole member of the AOR family containing molybdenum. GAPOR may be involved in glycolysis, but the functions of the other proteins are not yet clear. AOR has been proposed to be the primary enzyme responsible for oxidising the aldehydes that are produced by the 2-keto acid oxidoreductases.

AOR is found in hyperthermophillic archaea, Pyrococcus furiosus. The archaeons Pyrococcus ES-4 strain and Thermococcus ES-1 strain differ by their substrate specificity: AFOs show a broader size range of its aldehyde substrates. Its primary role is to oxidize aldehyde coming derived from the metabolism of amino acids and glucoses. Aldehyde Ferredoxin Oxidoreductase is a member of an AOR family, which includes glyceraldehyde-3-phosphate ferredoxin oxidoreductase (GAPOR) and Formaldehyde Ferredoxin Oxidoreductase.

== Function ==
AOR functions at high temperature conditions (~80 degrees Celsius) at an optimal pH of 8-9. It is oxygen-sensitive as it loses bulk of its activity from oxygen exposure and works in the cytoplasm where it is a reducing environment. Thus, either exposure to oxygen or lowering of the temperature causes an irreversible loss of its catalytic properties. Also, as a result of oxygen sensitivity of AOR, purification of the enzyme is done under anoxic environments.

It is proposed that AOR has a role in the Entner-Doudoroff pathway (glucose degradation) due to its increased activity with maltose incorporation. However, other proposals include its role in oxidation of amino acid metabolism aldehyde side products coming from de-aminated 2-ketoacids. The main substrates for aldehyde ferredoxin oxidoreductase are acetaldehyde, phenylacetaldehyde, and isovalerdehyde, which is a metabolic product from common amino acids and glucose. For example, acetaldehyde reaches its kcat/KM value up to 22.0 μM-1s-1. In fact, some microorganisms only make use of amino acids as a carbon source, such as Thermococcus strain ES1; thus, they utilize aldehyde ferredoxin oxidoreductase to metabolize the amino acid carbon source.

== Structure ==
AOR is homodimeric. Each 67kDa subunit contains 1 tungsten and 4-5 Iron atoms. The two subunits are bridged by a low spin Iron center. It is believed that the two subunits function independently.

Tungsten-pterin

Tungsten in the active site of AOR adopts a distorted square pyramidal geometry bound an oxo/hydroxo ligand and the dithiolene substituents of two molybdopterin cofactors.

Molybdopterin cofactor, shown in the dithiol protonation state.

Two molybdopterin cofactors bind tungsten, as observed in many related enzymes. Tungsten is not bonded directly to the protein. Phosphate centers pendant on the cofactor are bound to a Mg^{2+}, which is also bound by Asn93 and Ala183 to complete its octahedral coordination sphere. Thus, pterin and Tungsten atoms are connected to the AOR enzyme primarily through pterin's Hydrogen bonding networks with the amino acid residues. In addition, two water ligands that occupy the octahedral geometry take part in hydrogen bonding networks with pterin, phosphate, and Mg^{2+}. While [Fe4S4] cluster is bound by four Cys ligands, Pterin - rich in amino and ether linkages - interacts with the Asp-X-X-Gly-Leu-(Cys/Asp) sequences in the AOR enzyme. In such sequence, Cys494 residue is also hydrogen bonded to the [Fe4S4] cluster. This indicates that Cys494 residue connects the Tungsten site and the [Fe4S4] cluster site in the enzyme. Iron atom in the cluster is additionally bound by three other Cystein ligands: . Also, another linker amino acid residue between ferredoxin cluster and pterin is the Arg76, which hydrogen bonds to both pterin and ferredoxin. It is proposed that such hydrogen bonding interactions imply pterin cyclic ring system as an electron carrier. Additionally the C=O center of the pterin binds Na^{+}. The W=O center is proposed, not verified crystallographically.

AOR consists of three domains, domain 1, 2, and 3. While domain 1 contains pterin bound to tungsten, the other two domains provide a channel from tungsten to protein's surface (15 Angstroms in length) in order to allow specific substrates to enter the enzyme through its channel. In the active site, this pterin molecules is in a saddle-like conformation (500 to the normal plane) to “sit” on the domain 1 which also takes on a form with beta sheets to accommodate the Tungsten-Pterin site.

Iron

The iron center in between the two subunits serve a structural role in AOR. Iron metal atoms takes on a tetrahedral conformation while the ligand coordination comes from two histidines and glutamic acids. This is not known to have any functional role in the redox activity of the protein.

Fe4S4 centre

[Fe4S4] cluster in AOR is different in some aspects to other ferredoxin molecules. EPR measurements confirm that it serves as a one-electron shuttle.

== Aldehyde ferredoxin oxidoreductase mechanism ==
In the catalytic cycle, W(VI) (tungsten "six") converts to W(IV) concomitant with oxidation of the aldehyde to a carboxylic acid (equivalently, a carboxylate). A W(V) intermediate can be detected by EPR spectroscopy.

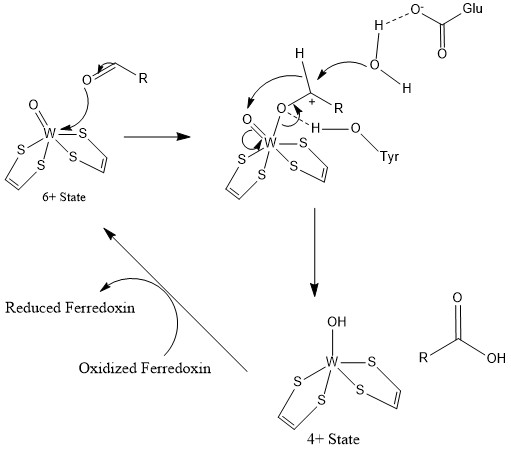
AOR mechanism at the active site.

General Reaction Mechanism of AOR:

RCHO + H2O → RCO_{2}H + 2H^{+} + 2 e^{−}

The redox equivalents are provided by the 4Fe-4S cluster.

A tyrosine residue is proposed to activate the electrophilic centre of aldehydes by H-bonding to the carbonyl oxygen atom, coordinated to the W centre. A glutamic acid residue near the active site activates a water molecule for a nucleophilic attack on aldehyde carbonyl center. After nucleophilic attack by water, hydride is transferred to oxo-tungsten sie thus, . Subsequently, W(VI) is regenerated by electron transfer to the 4Fe-4S center. With formaldehyde ferredoxin oxidoreductase, Glu308 and Tyr 416 would be involved while Glu313 and His448 is shown to be present in AOR active site.
