= Metal–ligand multiple bond =

Chemical interaction of certain ligands with metals of bond order >1

In organometallic chemistry, a metal–ligand multiple bond describes the interaction of certain ligands with a metal with a bond order greater than one. Coordination complexes featuring multiply bonded ligands are of both scholarly and practical interest. For example, transition metal carbene complexes catalyze the olefin metathesis reaction, and metal oxo intermediates are pervasive in oxidation catalysis.

Most common classes of complexes showing metal–ligand multiple bonds

As a cautionary note, the classification of a metal–ligand bond as being "multiple" bond order is ambiguous and even arbitrary because bond order is a formalism. Furthermore, the usage of multiple bonding is not uniform. Symmetry arguments suggest that most ligands engage metals via multiple bonds. The term 'metal–ligand multiple bond" is often reserved for ligands of the type CR_{n} and NR_{n} (n = 0, 1, 2) and OR_{n} (n = 0, 1) where R is H or an organic substituent, or pseudohalide. Historically, CO and NO^{+} are not included in this classification, nor are halides.

== Pi-donor ligands ==
In coordination chemistry, a pi-donor ligand is a kind of ligand endowed with filled non-bonding orbitals that overlap with metal-based orbitals. Their interaction is complementary to the behavior of pi-acceptor ligands. The existence of terminal oxo ligands for the early transition metals is one consequence of this kind of bonding. Classic pi-donor ligands are oxide (O^{2−}), nitride (N^{3−}), imide (RN^{2−}), alkoxide (RO^{−}), amide (R_{2}N^{−}), and fluoride. For late transition metals, strong pi-donors form anti-bonding interactions with the filled d-levels, with consequences for spin state, redox potentials, and ligand exchange rates. Pi-donor ligands are low in the spectrochemical series.

== Multiple bond stabilization ==
Metals bound to so-called triply bonded carbyne, imide, nitride (nitrido), and oxide (oxo) ligands are generally assigned to high oxidation states with low d electron counts. The high oxidation state stabilizes the highly reduced ligands. The low d electron count allow for many bonds between ligands and the metal center. A d^{0} metal center can accommodate up to 9 bonds without violating the 18 electron rule, whereas a d^{6} species can only accommodate 6 bonds.

== Reactivity explained through ligand hybridization ==
A ligand described in ionic terms can bond to a metal through however many lone pairs it has available. For example, many alkoxides use one of their three lone pairs to make a single bond to a metal center. In this situation the oxygen is sp^{3} hybridized according to valence bond theory. Increasing the bond order to two by involving another lone pair changes the hybridization at the oxygen to an sp^{2} center with an expected expansion in the M-O-R bond angle and contraction in the M-O bond length. If all three lone pairs are included for a bond order of three than the M-O bond distance contracts further and since the oxygen is a sp center the M-O-R bond angle is 180˚ or linear. Similarly with the imidos are commonly referred to as either bent (sp^{2}) or linear (sp). Even the oxo can be sp^{2} or sp hybridized. The triply bonded oxo, similar to carbon monoxide, is partially positive at the oxygen atom and unreactive toward Brønsted acids at the oxygen atom. When such a complex is reduced, the triple bond can be converted to a double bond at which point the oxygen no longer bears a partial positive charge and is reactive toward acid.

== Conventions ==
=== Bonding representations ===
Imido ligands, also known as imides or nitrenes, most commonly form "linear six electron bonds" with metal centers. Bent imidos are a rarity limited by complexes electron count, orbital bonding availability, or some similar phenomenon. It is common to draw only two lines of bonding for all imidos, including the most common linear imidos with a six electron bonding interaction to the metal center. Similarly amido complexes are usually drawn with a single line even though most amido bonds involve four electrons. Alkoxides are generally drawn with a single bond although both two and four electron bonds are common. Oxo can be drawn with two lines regardless of whether four electrons or six are involved in the bond, although it is not uncommon to see six electron oxo bonds represented with three lines.

=== Representing oxidation states ===
There are two motifs to indicate a metal oxidation state based around the actual charge separation of the metal center. Oxidation states up to +3 are believed to be an accurate representation of the charge separation experienced by the metal center. For oxidation states of +4 and larger, the oxidation state becomes more of a formalism with much of the positive charge distributed between the ligands. This distinction can be expressed by using a Roman numeral for the lower oxidation states in the upper right of the metal atomic symbol and an Arabic number with a plus sign for the higher oxidation states (see the example below). This formalism is not rigorously followed and the use of Roman numerals to represent higher oxidation states is common.

[M^{III}L_{n}]^{3+} vs. [O=M^{5+}L_{n}]^{3+}

== Further reading (specialized literature) ==
- Heidt, L.J.; Koster, G.F.; Johnson, A.M. (1959). "Experimental and Crystal Field Study of the Absorption Spectrum at 2000 to 8000 A of to Manganous Perchlorate in Aqueous Perchloric Acid". J. Am. Chem. Soc. 80: 6471–6477. doi:10.1021/ja01557a001.
- Rohde, JU; In, JH; Lim, MH; Brennessel, WW; Bukowski, MR; Stubna, A; Münck, E; Nam, W; Que, L Jr (2003). "Crystallographic and spectroscopic characterization of a nonheme Fe(IV)-O complex". Science. 299: 1037–9. doi:10.1126/science.299.5609.1037. JSTOR 3833551. PMID 12586936.
- Decker, A.; Rohde, J.; Que, L.; Solomon, E.I. (2004). "Spectroscopic and Quantum Chemical Characterization of the Electronic Structure and Bonding in a Non-Heme Fe^{IV}O Complex". J. Am. Chem. Soc. 126: 5378–5379. doi:10.1021/ja0498033.
- Aliaga-Alcalde, N.; George, S.D.; Mienert, B.; Bill, E.; Wieghardt, K.; Neese, F. (2005). "The Geometric and Electronic Structure of [(cyclam-acetato)Fe(N)]^{+}: A Genuine Iron(V) Species with a Ground-State Spin S=1/2". Angew. Chem. Int. Ed. 44: 2908–2912. doi:10.1002/anie.200462368.
