= Sulfite oxidase =

sulfite oxidase
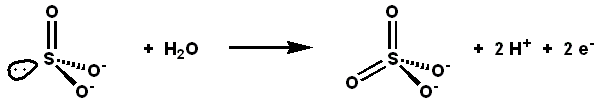
- Sulfite oxidase catalyses the oxidation-reduction reaction of sulfite and water, yielding sulfate.

Identifiers
- EC no.: 1.8.3.1
- CAS no.: 9029-38-3

Databases
- BRENDA: enzyme data
- ExPASy: NiceZyme view
- KEGG: enzyme entry
- MetaCyc: metabolic pathway
- Rhea: reactions
- PDB structures: RCSB PDB PDBe PDBsum
- Gene Ontology: AmiGO / QuickGO
Search
- PMC: articles
- PubMed: articles
- NCBI: proteins

SUOX
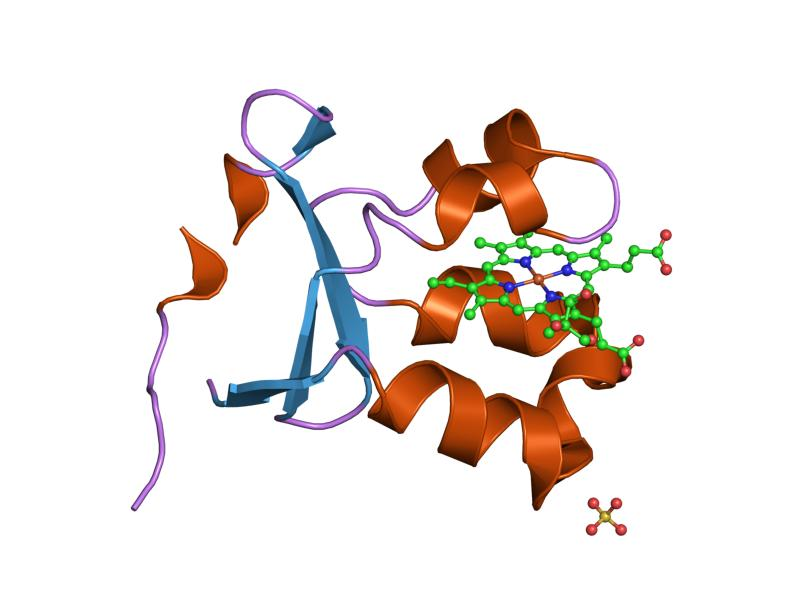

Identifiers
- Aliases: SUOX, entrez:6821, sulfite oxidase
- External IDs: OMIM: 606887; MGI: 2446117; GeneCards: SUOX
Available structures
PDB	Ortholog search: PDBe RCSB
PDB	List of PDB id codes 1MJ4
Enzyme activity
EC #	BRENDA	ExPASy	KEGG	MetaCyc
1.8.3.1	↗	↗	↗	↗

Gene location (Human)
Chr.	Chromosome 12 (human)
Band	12q13.2	Start	55,997,180 bp
Band	12q13.2	End	56,006,641 bp

Gene location (Mouse)
Chr.	Chromosome 10 (mouse)
Band	10|10 D3	Start	128,505,763 bp
Band	10|10 D3	End	128,509,942 bp
RNA expression pattern
Bgee	Human / Mouse (ortholog); Top expressed in: right lobe of liver; right adrenal gland; right adrenal cortex; human kidney; left adrenal gland; left adrenal cortex; mucosa of transverse colon; muscle of thigh; apex of heart; renal medulla / Top expressed in: seminal vesicula; gastrula; pyloric antrum; mucous cell of stomach; left lobe of liver; epithelium of stomach; right kidney; decidua; human kidney; triceps brachii muscle; More reference expression data
BioGPS	n/a
Gene ontology
Molecular function	molybdopterin cofactor binding; molybdenum ion binding; oxidoreductase activity; sulfite oxidase activity; heme binding; metal ion binding; protein binding
Cellular component	mitochondrial matrix; mitochondrial intermembrane space; mitochondrion
Biological process	sulfur compound metabolic process; sulfide oxidation, using sulfide:quinone oxidoreductase; nitrate assimilation
Sources:Amigo / QuickGO
Orthologs
Databases	NCBI: entry; OMA: entry
Species	Human	Mouse
Entrez	6821	211389
Ensembl	ENSG00000139531	ENSMUSG00000049858
UniProt	P51687	Q8R086
RefSeq (mRNA)	NM_000456; NM_001032386; NM_001032387	NM_173733
RefSeq (protein)	NP_000447; NP_001027558; NP_001027559	NP_776094
Location (UCSC)	Chr 12: 56 – 56.01 Mb	Chr 10: 128.51 – 128.51 Mb
PubMed search
- Wikidata
View/Edit Human	View/Edit Mouse

Sulfite oxidase (EC 1.8.3.1) is an enzyme in the mitochondria of all eukaryotes, with exception of the yeasts. It oxidizes sulfite to sulfate and, via cytochrome c, transfers the electrons produced to the electron transport chain, allowing generation of ATP in oxidative phosphorylation. This is the last step in the metabolism of sulfur-containing compounds and the sulfate is excreted.

Sulfite oxidase is a metallo-enzyme that utilizes a molybdopterin cofactor and a heme group (in the case of animals). It is one of the cytochromes b_{5} and belongs to the enzyme super-family of molybdenum oxotransferases that also includes DMSO reductase, xanthine oxidase, and nitrite reductase.

In mammals, the expression levels of sulfite oxidase is high in the liver, kidney, and heart, and very low in spleen, brain, skeletal muscle, and blood.

== Structure ==
As a homodimer, sulfite oxidase contains two identical subunits with an N-terminal domain and a C-terminal domain. These two domains are connected by ten amino acids forming a loop. The N-terminal domain has a heme cofactor with three adjacent antiparallel beta sheets and five alpha helices. The C-terminal domain hosts a molybdopterin cofactor that is surrounded by thirteen beta sheets and three alpha helices. The molybdopterin cofactor has a Mo(VI) center, which is bonded to a sulfur from cysteine, an ene-dithiolate from pyranopterin, and two terminal oxygens. It is at this molybdenum center that the catalytic oxidation of sulfite takes place.

The pyranopterin ligand which coordinates the molybdenum centre via the enedithiolate. The molybdenum centre has a square pyramidal geometry and is distinguished from the xanthine oxidase family by the orientation of the oxo group facing downwards rather than up.

== Active site and mechanism ==
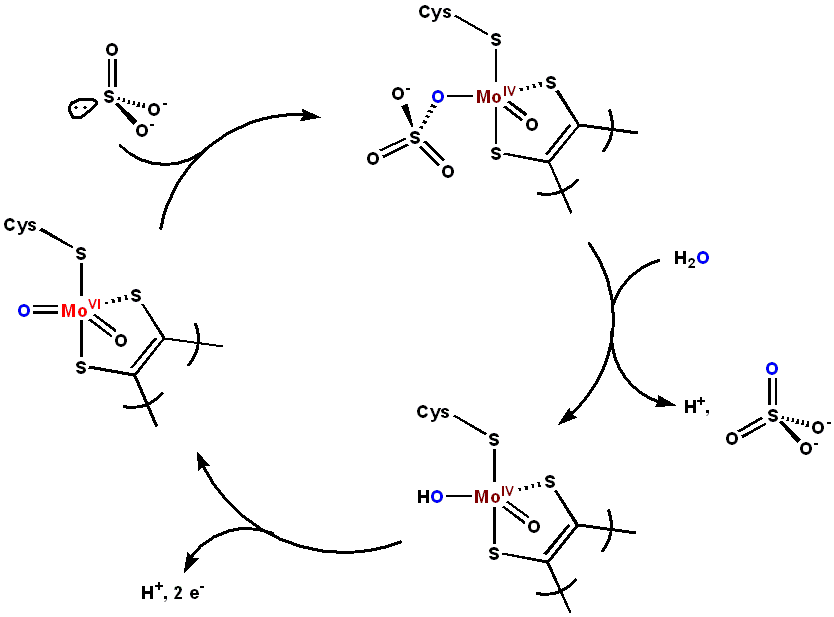
A proposed mechanism of the oxidation of sulfite to sulfate by sulfite oxidase.

The active site of sulfite oxidase contains the molybdopterin cofactor and supports molybdenum in its highest oxidation state, +6 (Mo^{VI}). In the enzyme's oxidized state, molybdenum is coordinated by a cysteine thiolate, the dithiolene group of molybdopterin, and two terminal oxygen atoms (oxos). Upon reacting with sulfite, one oxygen atom is transferred to sulfite to produce sulfate, and the molybdenum center is reduced by two electrons to Mo^{IV}. Water then displaces sulfate, and the removal of two protons (H^{+}) and two electrons (e^{−}) returns the active site to its original state. A key feature of this oxygen atom transfer enzyme is that the oxygen atom being transferred arises from water, not from dioxygen (O_{2}).

Electrons are passed one at a time from the molybdenum to the heme group which reacts with cytochrome c to reoxidize the enzyme. The electrons from this reaction enter the electron transport chain (ETC).

This reaction is generally the rate limiting reaction. Upon reaction of the enzyme with sulfite, it is reduced by 2 electrons. The negative potential seen with re-reduction of the enzyme shows the oxidized state is favoured.

Among the Mo enzyme classes, sulfite oxidase is the most easily oxidized. Although under low pH conditions the oxidative reaction become partially rate limiting.

== Deficiency ==
Sulfite oxidase is required to metabolize the sulfur-containing amino acids cysteine and methionine in foods. Lack of functional sulfite oxidase causes a disease known as sulfite oxidase deficiency. This rare but fatal disease causes neurological disorders, intellectual disability, physical deformities, the degradation of the brain, and death. Reasons for the lack of functional sulfite oxidase include a genetic defect that leads to the absence of a molybdopterin cofactor and point mutations in the enzyme. A G473D mutation impairs dimerization and catalysis in human sulfite oxidase.

== See also ==
- Sulfur metabolism
- Bioinorganic chemistry
