= Formate dehydrogenase (acceptor) =

Enzyme

Identifiers
- EC no.: 1.1.99.33

Databases
- IntEnz: IntEnz view
- BRENDA: BRENDA entry
- ExPASy: NiceZyme view
- KEGG: KEGG entry
- MetaCyc: metabolic pathway
- PRIAM: profile
- PDB structures: RCSB PDB PDBe PDBsum
Search
- PMC: articles
- PubMed: articles
- NCBI: proteins

Formate dehydrogenase (acceptor) (EC 1.1.99.33, FDHH, FDH-H, FDH-O, formate dehydrogenase H, formate dehydrogenase O) is an enzyme with systematic name formate:acceptor oxidoreductase. This enzyme catalyses the following chemical reaction

formate + acceptor $\rightleftharpoons$ CO_{2} + reduced acceptor

Formate dehydrogenase H is a cytoplasmic enzyme that oxidizes formate without oxygen transfer] transferring electrons to a hydrogenase.
