= Molybdenum oxotransferase =

The enzyme super-family of molybdenum oxotransferases all contain molybdenum, and promote oxygen atom transfer reactions.

Enzymes in this family include DMSO reductase, xanthine oxidase, nitrite reductase, and sulfite oxidase.

== See also ==
- Bioinorganic chemistry
