= Formate dehydrogenase-N =

Identifiers
- EC no.: 1.1.5.6

Databases
- IntEnz: IntEnz view
- BRENDA: BRENDA entry
- ExPASy: NiceZyme view
- KEGG: KEGG entry
- MetaCyc: metabolic pathway
- PRIAM: profile
- PDB structures: RCSB PDB PDBe PDBsum
Search
- PMC: articles
- PubMed: articles
- NCBI: proteins

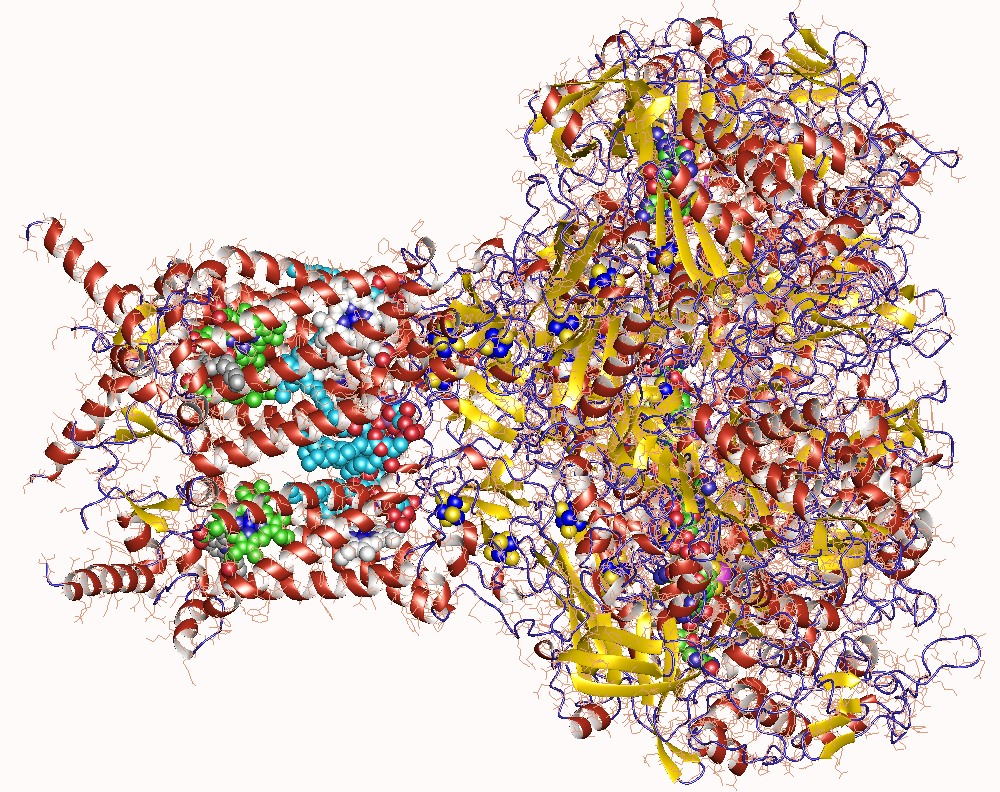

Formate dehydrogenase-N (EC 1.1.5.6, Fdh-N, FdnGHI, nitrate-inducible formate dehydrogenase, formate dehydrogenase N, FDH-N, nitrate inducible Fdn, nitrate inducible formate dehydrogenase) is an enzyme with systematic name formate:quinone oxidoreductase. This enzyme catalyses the following chemical reaction

formate + quinone $\rightleftharpoons$ CO_{2} + quinol

This enzyme contains molybdopterin-guanine dinucleotides, five [4Fe-4S] clusters and two heme b groups.
