= Cl-transporting ATPase =

Class of enzymes

chloride-transporting ATPase

Identifiers
- EC no.: 3.6.3.11

Databases
- IntEnz: IntEnz view
- BRENDA: BRENDA entry
- ExPASy: NiceZyme view
- KEGG: KEGG entry
- MetaCyc: metabolic pathway
- PRIAM: profile
- PDB structures: RCSB PDB PDBe PDBsum
- Gene Ontology: AmiGO / QuickGO
Search
- PMC: articles
- PubMed: articles
- NCBI: proteins

In enzymology, a Cl-transporting ATPase (EC 3.6.3.11) is an enzyme that catalyzes the chemical reaction

ATP + H_{2}O + Cl^{−}_{out} $\rightleftharpoons$ ADP + phosphate + Cl^{−}_{in}

The 3 substrates of this enzyme are ATP, H_{2}O, and Cl^{−}, whereas its 3 products are ADP, phosphate, and Cl^{−}.

This enzyme belongs to the family of hydrolases, specifically those acting on acid anhydrides to catalyse transmembrane movement of substances. The systematic name of this enzyme class is ATP phosphohydrolase (Cl^{−}-importing). Other names in common use include Cl^{−}-translocating ATPase, and Cl^{−}-motive ATPase.
