= Formate dehydrogenase (cytochrome-c-553) =

Enzyme class

formate dehydrogenase (cytochrome-c-553)

Identifiers
- EC no.: 1.17.2.3

Databases
- IntEnz: IntEnz view
- BRENDA: BRENDA entry
- ExPASy: NiceZyme view
- KEGG: KEGG entry
- MetaCyc: metabolic pathway
- PRIAM: profile
- PDB structures: RCSB PDB PDBe PDBsum
- Gene Ontology: AmiGO / QuickGO
Search
- PMC: articles
- PubMed: articles
- NCBI: proteins

In enzymology, a formate dehydrogenase (cytochrome-c-553) (EC 1.17.2.3) is an enzyme that catalyzes the chemical reaction

formate + ferricytochrome c-553 $\rightleftharpoons$ CO_{2} + ferrocytochrome c-553

Thus, the two substrates of this enzyme are formate and ferricytochrome c-553, whereas its two products are CO_{2} and ferrocytochrome c-553.

This enzyme belongs to the family of oxidoreductases, specifically those acting on the aldehyde or oxo group of donor with a cytochrome as acceptor. The systematic name of this enzyme class is formate:ferricytochrome-c-553 oxidoreductase.
