= Formate dehydrogenase (NADP+) =

Enzyme

formate dehydrogenase (NADP+)

Identifiers
- EC no.: 1.17.1.10
- CAS no.: 51377-43-6

Databases
- IntEnz: IntEnz view
- BRENDA: BRENDA entry
- ExPASy: NiceZyme view
- KEGG: KEGG entry
- MetaCyc: metabolic pathway
- PRIAM: profile
- PDB structures: RCSB PDB PDBe PDBsum
- Gene Ontology: AmiGO / QuickGO
Search
- PMC: articles
- PubMed: articles
- NCBI: proteins

In enzymology, a formate dehydrogenase (NADP+) (EC 1.17.1.10) is an enzyme that catalyzes the chemical reaction

formate + NADP^{+} $\rightleftharpoons$ CO_{2} + NADPH

Thus, the two substrates of this enzyme are formate and NADP^{+}, whereas its two products are CO_{2} and NADPH.

This enzyme belongs to the family of oxidoreductases, specifically those acting on the aldehyde or oxo group of donor with NAD+ or NADP+ as acceptor. The systematic name of this enzyme class is formate:NADP+ oxidoreductase. Other names in common use include NADP+-dependent formate dehydrogenase, and formate dehydrogenase (NADP+). This enzyme participates in methane metabolism. It has 3 cofactors: iron, Tungsten, and Selenium.

== Structural studies ==
As of late 2007, only one structure has been solved for this class of enzymes, with the PDB accession code 2GSD.
