= Atomic ratio =

Measure of the ratio of atoms of one kind (i) to another kind (j)

The atomic ratio is a measure of the ratio of atoms of one kind (i) to another kind (j). A closely related concept is the atomic percent (or at.%), which gives the percentage of one kind of atom relative to the total number of atoms. The molecular equivalents of these concepts are the molar fraction, or molar percent.

== Atoms ==
Mathematically, the atomic percent is

$\mathrm{atomic \ percent} \ (\mathrm{i}) = \frac{N_\mathrm{i}}{N_\mathrm{tot}} \times 100 \$ %

where N_{i} are the number of atoms of interest and N_{tot} are the total number of atoms, while the atomic ratio is

$$\mathrm{atomic \ ratio} \ (\mathrm{i:j}) = \mathrm{atomic \ percent} \ (\mathrm{i}) : \mathrm{atomic \ percent} \ (\mathrm{j}) \ .$$

For example, the atomic percent of hydrogen in water (H_{2}O) is at.%_{H_{2}O} = 2/3 x 100 ≈ 66.67%, while the atomic ratio of hydrogen to oxygen is A_{H:O} = 2:1.

== Isotopes ==
Another application is in radiochemistry, where this may refer to isotopic ratios or isotopic abundances. Mathematically, the isotopic abundance is

$$\mathrm{isotopic \ abundance} \ (\mathrm{i}) = \frac{N_\mathrm{i}}{N_\mathrm{tot}} \ ,$$

where N_{i} are the number of atoms of the isotope of interest and N_{tot} is the total number of atoms, while the atomic ratio is

$$\mathrm{isotopic \ ratio} \ (\mathrm{i:j}) = \mathrm{isotopic \ percent} \ (\mathrm{i}) : \mathrm{isotopic \ percent} \ (\mathrm{j}) \ .$$

For example, the isotopic ratio of deuterium (D) to hydrogen (H) in heavy water is roughly D:H = 1:7000 (corresponding to an isotopic abundance of 0.00014%).

== Doping in laser physics ==
In laser physics however, the atomic ratio may refer to the doping ratio or the doping fraction.

- For example, theoretically, a 100% doping ratio of Yb : Y_{3}Al_{5}O_{12} is pure Yb_{3}Al_{5}O_{12}.
- The doping fraction equals,

$$\mathrm \frac{N_\mathrm{atoms \ of \ dopant}}{N_\mathrm{atoms \ of \ solution \ which \  can \ be \ substituted \ with \ the \ dopant}}$$

== See also ==
- Table of concentration measures
