= Formate dehydrogenase (cytochrome) =

Type of enzyme

formate dehydrogenase (cytochrome)
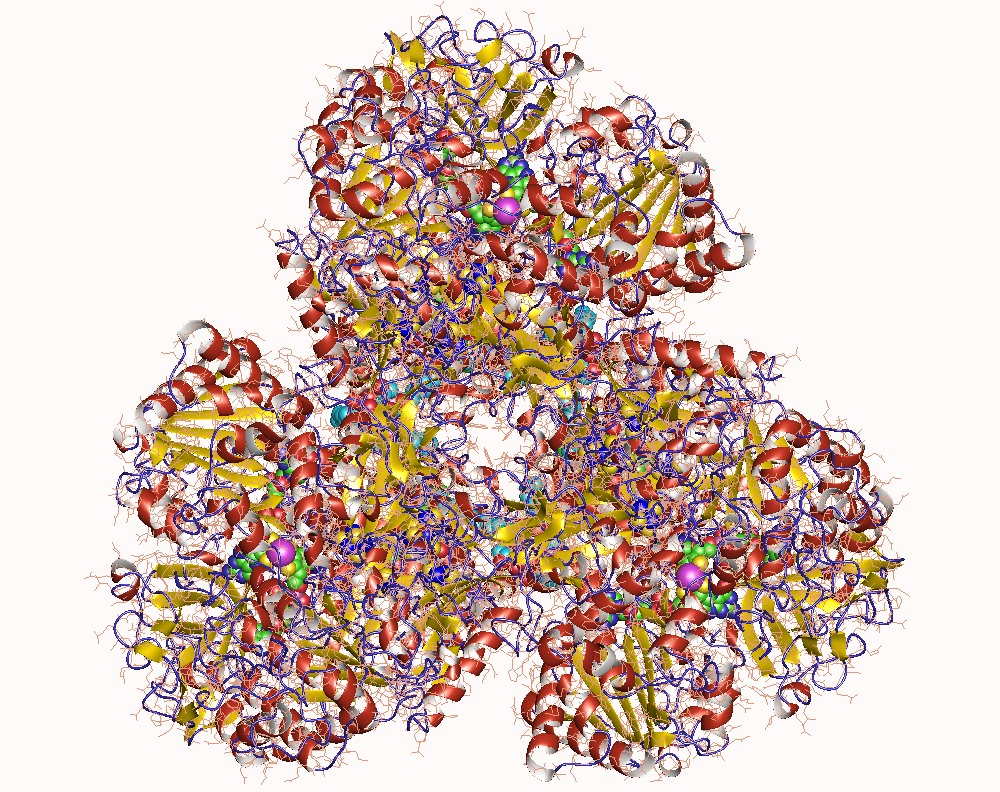
- Formate dehydrogenase-N hetero9mer, E.Coli

Identifiers
- EC no.: 1.2.2.1

Databases
- IntEnz: IntEnz view
- BRENDA: BRENDA entry
- ExPASy: NiceZyme view
- KEGG: KEGG entry
- MetaCyc: metabolic pathway
- PRIAM: profile
- PDB structures: RCSB PDB PDBe PDBsum
- Gene Ontology: AmiGO / QuickGO
Search
- PMC: articles
- PubMed: articles
- NCBI: proteins

In enzymology, a formate dehydrogenase (cytochrome) (EC 1.2.2.1) is an enzyme that catalyzes the chemical reaction

formic acid
+ 2 ferricytochrome b_{1}
Fe(III)
Fe(II)
Fe(III)
Fe(II)
CO_{2} + 2 ferrocytochrome b_{1} + 2 H^{+}

This enzyme converts formic acid to carbon dioxide using the cofactor ferricytochrome b1, which is reduced from iron(III) to iron(II).

This enzyme belongs to the family of oxidoreductases, specifically those acting on the aldehyde or oxo group of donor with a cytochrome as acceptor. The systematic name of this enzyme class is formate:ferricytochrome-b1 oxidoreductase. Other names in common use include formate dehydrogenase, and formate:cytochrome b1 oxidoreductase. This enzyme participates in glyoxylate and dicarboxylate metabolism.
