= Molybdopterin =

Heterocyclic ligand that can complex molybdenum to form a Mo-cofactor

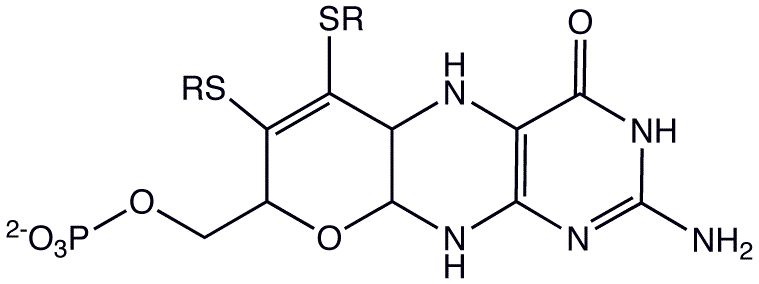

Names
- IUPAC name [2-amino-4-oxo-6,7-bis(sulfanyl)-3,5,5~{a},8,9~{a},10-hexahydropyrano[3,2-g]pteridin-8-yl]methyl dihydrogen phosphate

Identifiers
CAS Number	73508-07-3
3D model (JSmol)	based on the images on this page: Interactive image; from the PubChem page; several discrepancies with images on this page: Interactive image; with molybdenum; based on this image: Interactive image
ChemSpider	392290
MeSH	molybdopterin
PubChem CID	135402014
UNII	ATN6EG42UQ
- InChI: : InChI=1S/C10H14N5O6PS2/c11-10-14-7-4(8(16)15-10)12-3-6(24)5(23)2(21-9(3)13-7)1-20-22(17,18)19/h2-3,9,12,23-24H,1H2,(H2,17,18,19)(H4,11,13,14,15,16) Key: HPEUEJRPDGMIMY-UHFFFAOYSA-N
- SMILES: based on the images on this page: NC(=N1)NC(=O)C2=C1N[C@H]3[C@@H](N2)C(S)=C(S)[C@H](O3)COP([O-])([O-])=O; from the PubChem page; several discrepancies with images on this page: C(C1C(=C(C2C(O1)NC3=C(N2)C(=O)NC(=N3)N)S)S)OP(=O)(O)O; with molybdenum; based on this image: NC(=N1)NC(=O)C2=C1N[C@H]3[C@@H](N2)C(S4)=C(S[Mo]4(=O)(=O)O)[C@H](O3)COP([O-])([O-])=O

Properties
Chemical formula	C_{10}H_{10}N_{5}O_{6}PS_{2} + R groups
Molar mass	394.33 g/mol (R=H)
- Except where otherwise noted, data are given for materials in their standard state (at 25 °C [77 °F], 100 kPa). verify (what is ?) Infobox references

Four steps of molybdenum cofactor (Moco) biosynthetic pathway occurring in bacteria and humans: (i) radical-mediated cyclization guanosine 5'-triphosphate (GTP) to (8S)‑3,8‐cyclo‑7,8‑dihydroguanosine-5́‑triphosphate (3,8‑cH2GTP), (ii) formation of cyclic pyranopterin monophosphate (cPMP) from the 3,8‑cH2GTP, (iii) conversion of cPMP into molybdopterin (MPT), (iv) insertion of molybdate into MPT to form Moco (human enzymes in parentheses).

Molybdopterins are a class of cofactors found in most molybdenum-containing and all tungsten-containing enzymes. Synonyms for molybdopterin are: MPT and pyranopterin-dithiolate. The nomenclature for this biomolecule can be confusing: Molybdopterin itself contains no molybdenum; rather, this is the name of the ligand (a pterin) that will bind the active metal. After molybdopterin is eventually complexed with molybdenum, the complete ligand is usually called molybdenum cofactor. Molybdopterin is required for all forms of life.

Molybdopterin consists of a pyranopterin, a complex heterocycle featuring a pyran fused to a pterin ring. In addition, the pyran ring features two thiolates, which serve as ligands in molybdo- and tungstoenzymes. In some cases, the alkyl phosphate group is replaced by an alkyl diphosphate nucleotide. Enzymes that contain the molybdopterin cofactor include xanthine oxidase, DMSO reductase, sulfite oxidase, and nitrate reductase.

The only molybdenum-containing enzymes that do not feature molybdopterins are the nitrogenases (enzymes that fix nitrogen). These contain an iron-sulfur center of a very different type, which also contains molybdenum.

== Biosynthesis ==
Unlike many other cofactors, molybdenum cofactor (Moco) cannot be taken up as a nutrient. The cofactor thus requires de novo biosynthesis. Molybdenum cofactor biosynthesis occurs in four steps: (i) the radical-mediated cyclization of nucleotide, guanosine triphosphate (GTP), to (8S)‑3',8‐cyclo‑7,8‑dihydroguanosine 5'‑triphosphate (3',8‑cH_{2}GTP), (ii) the formation of cyclic pyranopterin monophosphate (cPMP) from the 3',8‑cH_{2}GTP, (iii) the conversion of cPMP into molybdopterin (MPT), (iv) the insertion of molybdate into MPT to form Moco.

Two enzyme-mediated reactions convert guanosine triphosphate to the cyclic phosphate of pyranopterin. One of these enzymes is a radical SAM, a family of enzymes often associated with C—X bond-forming reactions (X = S, N). This intermediate pyranopterin is then converted to the molybdopterin via the action of three further enzymes. In this conversion, the enedithiolate is formed, although the substituents on sulfur remain unknown. Sulfur is conveyed from cysteinyl persulfide in a manner reminiscent of the biosynthesis of iron-sulfur proteins. The monophosphate is adenylated (coupled to ADP) in a step that activates the cofactor toward binding Mo or W. These metals are imported as their oxyanions, molybdate, and tungstate.

In some enzymes, such as xanthine oxidase, the metal is bound to one molybdopterin, whereas, in other enzymes, e.g., DMSO reductase, the metal is bound to two molybdopterin cofactors.

Models for the active sites of enzymes molybdopterin-containing enzymes are based on a class of ligands known as dithiolenes.

== Tungsten derivatives ==
Some bacterial oxidoreductases use tungsten in a similar manner as molybdenum by using it in a tungsten-pterin complex, with molybdopterin. Thus, molybdopterin may complex with either molybdenum or tungsten. Tungsten-using enzymes typically reduce free carboxylic acids to aldehydes.

The first tungsten-requiring enzyme to be discovered also requires selenium (though the precise form is unknown). In this case, the tungsten-selenium pair has been speculated to function analogously to the molybdenum-sulfur pairing of some molybdenum cofactor-requiring enzymes. Although a tungsten-containing xanthine dehydrogenase from bacteria has been found to contain tungsten-molybdopterin and also non-protein-bound selenium (thus removing the possibility of selenium in selenocysteine or selenomethionine form), a tungsten-selenium molybdopterin complex has not been definitively described.

== Enzymes that use molybdopterin ==
Enzymes that use molybdopterin as cofactor or prosthetic group are given below. Molybdopterin is a:

- Cofactor of: xanthine oxidase, DMSO reductase, sulfite oxidase, nitrate reductase, ethylbenzene dehydrogenase, glyceraldehyde-3-phosphate ferredoxin oxidoreductase, respiratory arsenate reductase, carbon monoxide dehydrogenase, aldehyde oxidase.
- Prosthetic group of: formate dehydrogenase, purine hydroxylase, thiosulfate reductase.

== See also ==
- Molybdenum cofactor deficiency, a genetic illness.
- MOCOS, molybdenum cofactor sulfurase
- MOCS1, MOCS2, MOCS3, GEPH
