= Molybdopterin synthase =

Identifiers
- EC no.: 2.8.1.12

Databases
- IntEnz: IntEnz view
- BRENDA: BRENDA entry
- ExPASy: NiceZyme view
- KEGG: KEGG entry
- MetaCyc: metabolic pathway
- PRIAM: profile
- PDB structures: RCSB PDB PDBe PDBsum
Search
- PMC: articles
- PubMed: articles
- NCBI: proteins

Molybdopterin synthase (EC 2.8.1.12, MPT synthase) is an enzyme required to synthesize molybdopterin (MPT) from precursor Z (now known as cyclic pyranopterin monophosphate). Molydopterin is subsequently complexed with molybdenum to form molybdenum cofactor (MoCo). MPT synthase catalyses the following chemical reaction:

precursor Z + 2 [molybdopterin-synthase sulfur-carrier protein]-Gly-NH-CH_{2}-C(O)SH + H_{2}O $\rightleftharpoons$ molybdopterin + 2 molybdopterin-synthase sulfur-carrier protein

Molybdopterin synthase is heterodimeric and coded for by the MOCS2 gene. Genetic deficiencies of enzymes such as MPT synthase, which are involved in MoCo biosynthesis, lead to MoCo deficiency, a rare disease that results in severe neurological abnormalities.

== Structure ==
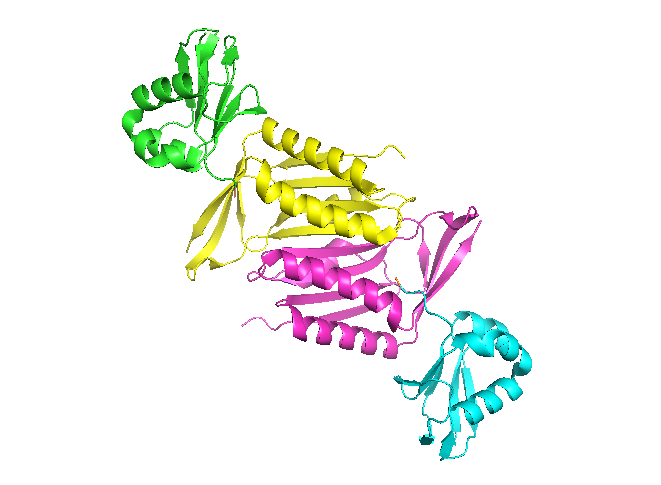
Human MPT Synthase crystal structure. Small subunits are shown in cyan and green, with their C-terminus colored orange. Large subunits are shown in yellow and magenta.

The high resolution crystal structure of MPT synthase shows the enzyme has a heterotetrametric structure composed of two small subunits (MoaD in prokaryotes) and two large subunits (MoaE in prokaryotes) with the small subunits at opposite ends of a central large subunit dimer. The C-terminus of each small subunit is inserted into a large subunit to form the active site. In the enzyme's activated form the C-terminus is present as a thiocarboxylate, which acts as the sulfur donor to precursor Z in MoCo biosynthesis. As a result, the active site of the enzyme must be in close proximity to the C-terminus of the small subunit (i.e. MoaD in prokaryotes). The high resolution crystal structure of the enzyme also reveals the presence of a binding pocket for the terminal phosphate of molybdopterin and suggests a possible binding site for the pterin moiety present both in precursor Z and molybdopterin.

The structural similarity between ubiquitin and the small subunit of MPT synthase hints at the evolutionary relationship of the MoCo biosynthesis pathway and the ubiquitin dependent protein degradation pathway. Specifically, the small subunit MoaD in prokaryotes is a sequence homolog of Urm1, indicating that MPT synthase probably shares a common ancestor with ubiquitin.

== Mechanism ==
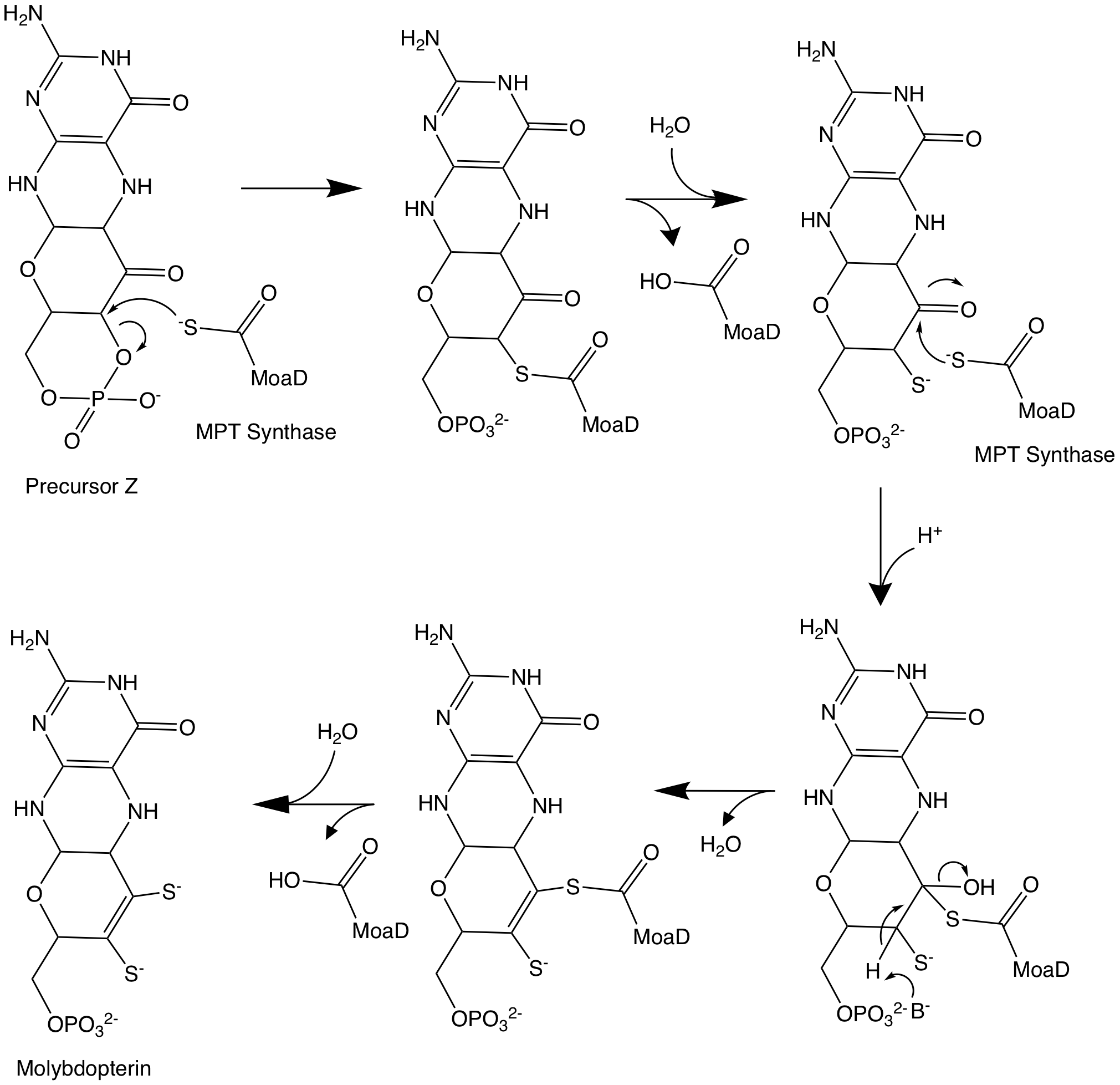
Prokaryote MPT Synthase Reaction Mechanism

The biosynthesis of MoCo is an old and evolutionary conserved pathway present in eukaryotes, eubacteria, and archea, which can be divided into three major steps. The first step involves the conversion of a guanosine nucleotide into precursor Z. In the following step, MPT synthase catalyzes the incorporation of the dithiolene moiety to precursor Z, which converts it to molybdopterin. More specifically, this interconversion involves the opening of the cyclic phosphate ring of precursor Z, and the addition of two side chain sulfhydryl groups. E-coli MPT synthase is activated by the formation of a thiocarboxylate group at the second glycine of its C-terminal Gly-Gly motif, which serves as the sulfur donor for the formation of the diothiolene group in MPT. That is, the mechanism on MPT synthase depends on the interconversion between the activated form of MoaD with the thiocarboxylate group and the MoaE protein In the final step of MoCo biosynthesis, molybdenum is incorporated to MPT by the two-domain protein gephyrin. MPT synthase sulfurylase recharges MPT synthase with a sulfur atom after each catalytic cycle.

== Biological function ==
MPT synthase is involved in the biosynthesis of MoCo, which is essential for the activity of enzymes like xanthine dehydrogenase, aldehyde oxidase, and sulfite oxidase in humans. MoCo containing enzymes typically catalyze the net transfer of an oxygen atom to and from their substrates in a two electron redox reaction.

== Disease relevance ==
MoCo deficiency in humans results in the combined deficiency of the MoCo-containing enzymes: sulfite oxidase, xanthine oxidase, and aldehyde oxidase. Symptoms of MoCo deficiency are linked to the accumulation of toxic metabolites caused by the reduced activity of these molybdoenzymes, especially sulfite oxidase. Genetic defects in MoCo biosynthesis lead to MoCo deficiency. These genetic defects affect the formation of precursor Z (known as group A MoCo deficiency) or the conversion of precursor Z to MoCo by MPT synthase (known as group B MoCo deficiency). MOCS1 is defective for group A (the majority of patients), and encodes two enzymes involved in the formation of precursor Z. MOCS2 is defective for group B and encodes the small and large subunits of MPT synthase. Groups A and B of deficiency show an identical phenotype, characterized by neonatal seizures, attenuated brain growth, dislocated ocular lenses, feeding difficulties, among other neurological symptoms. This rare but severe deficiency is an autosomal recessive trait, which usually results in early childhood death as there is currently no available treatment.
