= Molybdenum in biology =

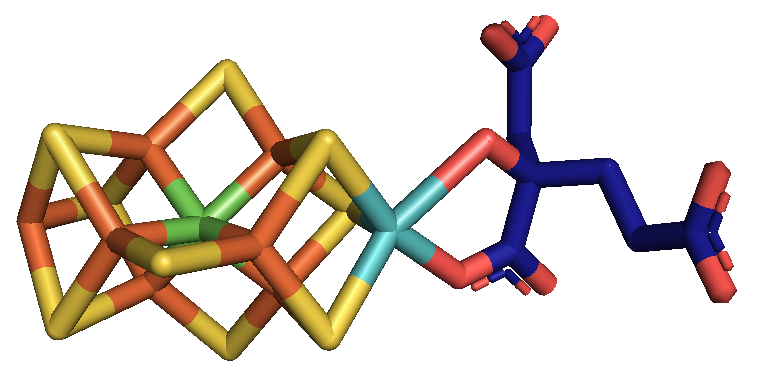
A FeMoco cluster with a molybdenum atom in the center

Molybdenum is an essential element in most organisms. It is most notably present in nitrogenase which is an essential part of nitrogen fixation.

== Mo-containing enzymes ==
Molybdenum is an essential element in most organisms; a 2008 research paper speculated that a scarcity of molybdenum in the Earth's early oceans may have strongly influenced the evolution of eukaryotic life (which includes all plants and animals).

At least 50 molybdenum-containing enzymes have been identified, mostly in bacteria. Those enzymes include aldehyde oxidase, sulfite oxidase and xanthine oxidase. With one exception, Mo in proteins is bound by molybdopterin to give the molybdenum cofactor. The only known exception is nitrogenase, which uses the FeMoco cofactor, which has the formula Fe_{7}MoS_{9}C.

In terms of function, molybdoenzymes catalyze the oxidation and sometimes reduction of certain small molecules in the process of regulating nitrogen, sulfur, and carbon. In some animals, and in humans, the oxidation of xanthine to uric acid, a process of purine catabolism, is catalyzed by xanthine oxidase, a molybdenum-containing enzyme. The activity of xanthine oxidase is directly proportional to the amount of molybdenum in the body. An extremely high concentration of molybdenum reverses the trend and can inhibit purine catabolism and other processes. Molybdenum concentration also affects protein synthesis, metabolism, and growth.

Mo is a component in most nitrogenases. Among molybdoenzymes, nitrogenases are unique in lacking the molybdopterin. Nitrogenases catalyze the production of ammonia from atmospheric nitrogen:

N_{2} + 8 H^{+} + 8 e^{−} + 16 ATP + 16 H_{2}O → 2 NH_{3} + H_{2} + 16 ADP + 16 P_{i}

The biosynthesis of the FeMoco active site is highly complex.

Structure of the FeMoco active site of nitrogenase.

The molybdenum cofactor (pictured) is composed of a molybdenum-free organic complex called molybdopterin, which has bound an oxidized molybdenum(VI) atom through adjacent sulfur (or occasionally selenium) atoms. Except for the ancient nitrogenases, all known Mo-using enzymes use this cofactor.

Molybdate is transported in the body as MoO^{2−}_{4}.

== Human metabolism and deficiency ==
Molybdenum is an essential trace dietary element. Four mammalian Mo-dependent enzymes are known, all of them harboring a pterin-based molybdenum cofactor (Moco) in their active site: sulfite oxidase, xanthine oxidoreductase, aldehyde oxidase, and mitochondrial amidoxime reductase. People severely deficient in molybdenum have poorly functioning sulfite oxidase and are prone to toxic reactions to sulfites in foods. The human body contains about 0.07 mg of molybdenum per kilogram of body weight, with higher concentrations in the liver and kidneys and lower in the vertebrae. Molybdenum is also present within human tooth enamel and may help prevent its decay.

Acute toxicity has not been seen in humans, and the toxicity depends strongly on the chemical state. Studies on rats show a median lethal dose (LD_{50}) as low as 180 mg/kg for some Mo compounds. Although human toxicity data is unavailable, animal studies have shown that chronic ingestion of more than 10 mg/day of molybdenum can cause diarrhea, growth retardation, infertility, low birth weight, and gout; it can also affect the lungs, kidneys, and liver. Sodium tungstate is a competitive inhibitor of molybdenum. Dietary tungsten reduces the concentration of molybdenum in tissues.

Low soil concentration of molybdenum in a geographical band from northern China to Iran results in a general dietary molybdenum deficiency, and is associated with increased rates of esophageal cancer. Compared to the United States, which has a greater supply of molybdenum in the soil, people living in those areas have about 16 times greater risk for esophageal squamous cell carcinoma.

Molybdenum deficiency has also been reported as a consequence of non-molybdenum supplemented total parenteral nutrition (complete intravenous feeding) for long periods of time. It results in high blood levels of sulfite and urate, in much the same way as molybdenum cofactor deficiency. Since pure molybdenum deficiency from this cause occurs primarily in adults, the neurological consequences are not as marked as in cases of congenital cofactor deficiency.

A congenital molybdenum cofactor deficiency disease, seen in infants, is an inability to synthesize molybdenum cofactor, the heterocyclic molecule discussed above that binds molybdenum at the active site in all known human enzymes that use molybdenum. The resulting deficiency results in high levels of sulfite and urate, and neurological damage.

== Excretion ==
Most molybdenum is excreted from the human body as molybdate in the urine. Furthermore, urinary excretion of molybdenum increases as dietary molybdenum intake increases. Small amounts of molybdenum are excreted from the body in the feces by way of the bile; small amounts also can be lost in sweat and in hair.

== Excess and copper antagonism ==
High levels of molybdenum can interfere with the body's uptake of copper, producing copper deficiency. Molybdenum prevents plasma proteins from binding to copper, and it also increases the amount of copper that is excreted in urine. Ruminants that consume high levels of molybdenum suffer from diarrhea, stunted growth, anemia, and achromotrichia (loss of fur pigment). These symptoms can be alleviated by copper supplements, either dietary or injection. The effective copper deficiency can be aggravated by excess sulfur.

Copper reduction or deficiency can also be deliberately induced for therapeutic purposes by the compound ammonium tetrathiomolybdate, in which the bright red anion tetrathiomolybdate is the copper-chelating agent. Tetrathiomolybdate was first used therapeutically in the treatment of copper toxicosis in animals. It was then introduced as a treatment in Wilson's disease, a hereditary copper metabolism disorder in humans; it acts both by competing with copper absorption in the bowel and by increasing excretion. It has also been found to have an inhibitory effect on angiogenesis, potentially by inhibiting the membrane translocation process that is dependent on copper ions. This is a promising avenue for investigation of treatments for cancer, age-related macular degeneration, and other diseases that involve a pathologic proliferation of blood vessels.

In some grazing livestock, most strongly in cattle, molybdenum excess in the soil of pasturage can produce scours (diarrhea) if the pH of the soil is neutral to alkaline; see teartness.
