= MOCS2 =

Protein-coding gene in the species Homo sapiens

Available structures
| PDB | Ortholog search: PDBe RCSB |
| PDB | List of PDB id codes 4AP8 |

Identifiers
- Aliases: MOCS2, MCBPE, MOCO1, MOCODB, MPTS, molybdenum cofactor synthesis 2
- External IDs: OMIM: 603708; MGI: 1336894; HomoloGene: 32193; GeneCards: MOCS2; OMA:MOCS2 - orthologs

Gene location (Human)
| Chr. | Chromosome 5 (human) |
| Band | 5q11.2 | Start | 53,095,679 bp |
| Band | 5q11.2 | End | 53,110,063 bp |

Gene location (Mouse)
| Chr. | Chromosome 13 (mouse) |
| Band | 13|13 D2.2 | Start | 114,954,772 bp |
| Band | 13|13 D2.2 | End | 114,968,811 bp |
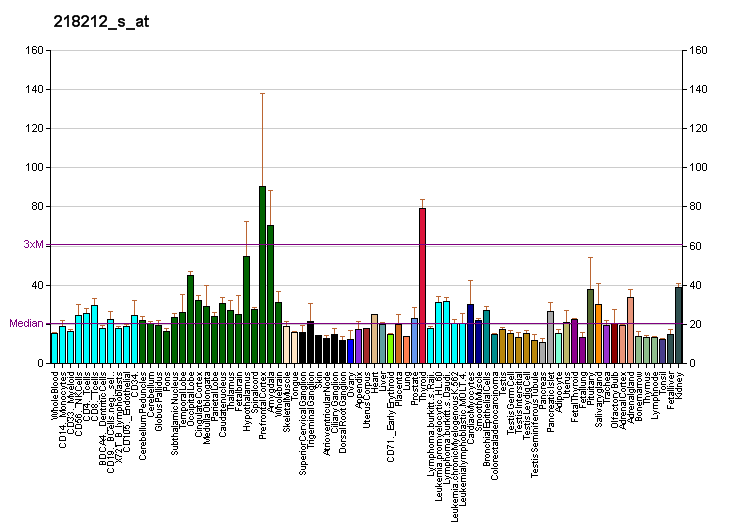
RNA expression pattern
| Bgee | Human / Mouse (ortholog); Top expressed in: anterior cingulate cortex; right adrenal gland; prefrontal cortex; right adrenal cortex; left adrenal gland; left adrenal cortex; caudate nucleus; right frontal lobe; right auricle of heart; nucleus accumbens / Top expressed in: lens; epithelium of lens; Paneth cell; transitional epithelium of urinary bladder; left lobe of liver; facial motor nucleus; supraoptic nucleus; jejunum; aortic valve; ascending aorta; More reference expression data |
| BioGPS | More reference expression data |
Gene ontology
| Molecular function | transferase activity; molybdopterin synthase activity; nucleotide binding |
| Cellular component | molybdopterin synthase complex; cytosol; nucleus; cytoplasm; nuclear speck |
| Biological process | Mo-molybdopterin cofactor biosynthetic process; molybdopterin cofactor biosynthetic process |
Sources:Amigo / QuickGO
Orthologs
| Species | Human | Mouse |
| Entrez | 4338 | 17434 |
| Ensembl | ENSG00000164172 | ENSMUSG00000015536 |
| UniProt | O96007; O96033 | Q9Z223; Q9Z224 |
| RefSeq (mRNA) | NM_176806; NM_004531 | NM_001113374; NM_001113375; NM_013826 |
| RefSeq (protein) | NP_004522; NP_789776; NP_789776.1 | NP_001106845; NP_001106846; NP_038854 |
| Location (UCSC) | Chr 5: 53.1 – 53.11 Mb | Chr 13: 114.95 – 114.97 Mb |
| PubMed search |
- Wikidata
| View/Edit Human | View/Edit Mouse |

Molybdenum cofactor synthesis protein 2A and molybdenum cofactor synthesis protein 2B are a pair of proteins that in humans are encoded from the same MOCS2 gene. These two proteins dimerize to form molybdopterin synthase.

== Function ==
Eukaryotic molybdoenzymes use a unique molybdenum cofactor (MoCo) consisting of a pterin and the catalytically active metal molybdenum. MoCo is synthesized from cyclic pyranopterin monophosphate (precursor Z) by the heterodimeric enzyme molybdopterin synthase.

== Gene ==
The large and small subunits of molybdopterin synthase are both encoded from the MOCS2 gene by overlapping open reading frames. The proteins were initially thought to be encoded from a bicistronic transcript. They are now thought to be encoded from monocistronic transcripts. Alternatively spliced transcripts have been found for this locus that encode the large and small subunits.

The MOCS2 gene contains 7 exons. Exons 1 to 3 encode MOCS2A (the small subunit), and exons 3 to 7 encode MOCS2B (large subunit).

=== Genetic disease ===
Defects in both copies of MOCS2 cause the molybdenum cofactor deficiency disease in babies.

== Protein structure ==
MOCS2A and MOCS2B subunits form dimers in solution. These dimers in turn dimerize to form the tetrameric molybdopterin synthase complex.
