= Mineral (nutrient) =

Chemical elements essential for life

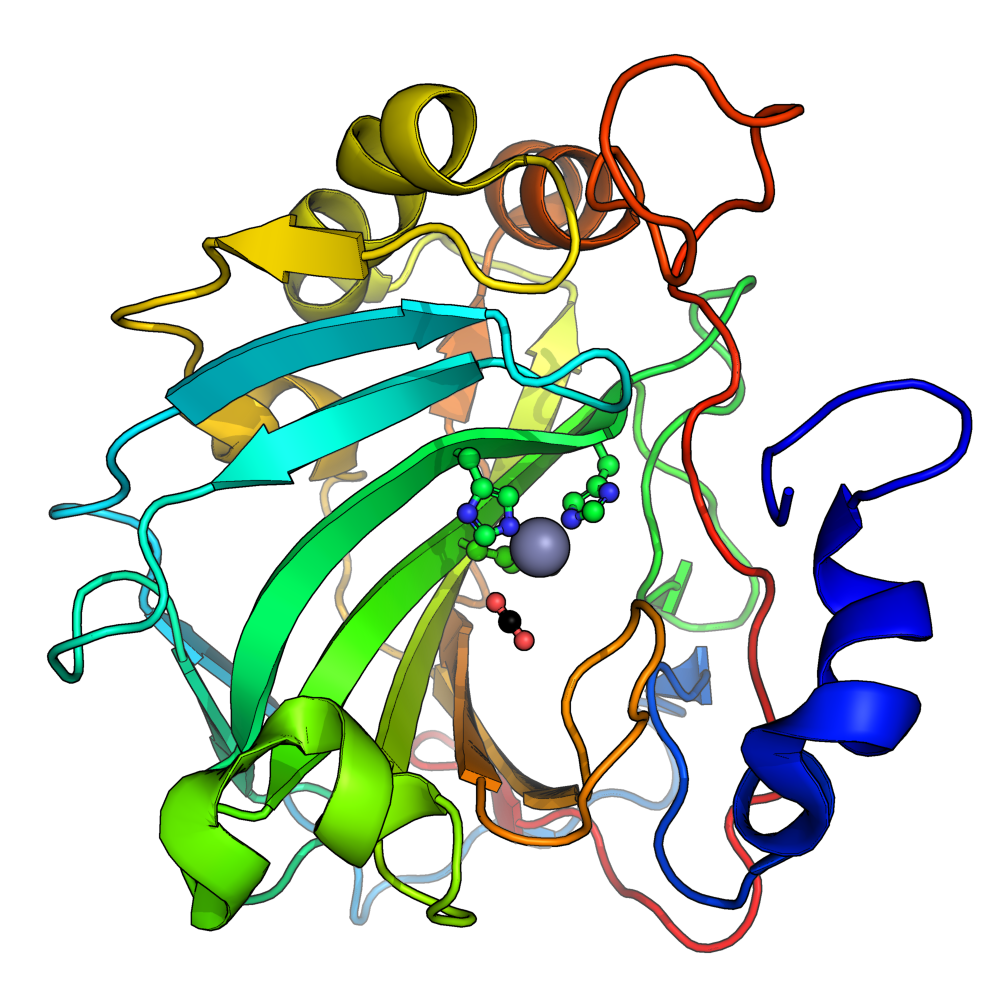
Carbonic anhydrase, an enzyme that requires zinc (gray sphere near the center of this image), is essential for exhalation of carbon dioxide.

In the context of nutrition, a mineral is a chemical element. Some "minerals" are essential for life, but most are not. Minerals are one of the four groups of essential nutrients; the others are vitamins, essential fatty acids, and essential amino acids. The five major minerals in the human body are calcium, phosphorus, potassium, sodium, and magnesium. The remaining minerals are called "trace elements". The generally accepted trace elements are iron, chlorine, cobalt, copper, zinc, manganese, molybdenum, iodine, selenium, and bromine; there is some evidence that there may be more.

The four organogenic elements, namely carbon, hydrogen, oxygen, and nitrogen (CHON), that comprise roughly 96% of the human body by weight, are usually not considered as minerals (nutrient). In fact, in nutrition, the term "mineral" refers more generally to all the other functional and structural elements found in living organisms.

Plants obtain minerals from soil. Animals ingest plants, thus moving minerals up the food chain. Larger organisms may also consume soil (geophagia) or use mineral resources such as salt licks to obtain minerals.

Finally, although mineral and elements are in many ways synonymous, minerals are only bioavailable to the extent that they can be absorbed. To be absorbed, minerals either must be soluble or readily extractable by the consuming organism. For example, molybdenum is an essential mineral, but metallic molybdenum has no nutritional benefit. Many molybdates are sources of molybdenum.

== Essential chemical elements for humans ==
Twenty chemical elements are known to be required to support human biochemical processes by serving structural and functional roles, and there is evidence for a few more.

Oxygen, hydrogen, carbon and nitrogen are the most abundant elements in the body by weight and make up about 96% of the weight of a human body. Calcium makes up 920 to 1200 grams of adult body weight, with 99% of it contained in bones and teeth. This is about 1.5% of body weight. Phosphorus occurs in amounts of about 2/3 of calcium, and makes up about 1% of a person's body weight. The other major minerals (potassium, sodium, chlorine, sulfur and magnesium) make up only about 0.85% of the weight of the body. Together these eleven chemical elements (H, C, N, O, Ca, P, K, Na, Cl, S, Mg) make up 99.85% of the body. The remaining ≈18 ultratrace minerals comprise just 0.15% of the body, or about one hundred grams in total for the average person. Total fractions in this paragraph are amounts based on summing percentages from the article on chemical composition of the human body.

Some diversity of opinion exists about the essential nature of various ultratrace elements in humans (and other mammals), even based on the same data. For example, whether chromium is essential in humans is debated. No Cr-containing biochemical has been purified. The United States and Japan designate chromium as an essential nutrient, but the European Food Safety Authority (EFSA), representing the European Union, reviewed the question in 2014 and does not agree.

Most of the known and suggested mineral nutrients are of relatively low atomic weight, and are reasonably common on land, or for sodium and iodine, in the ocean. They also tend to have soluble compounds at physiological pH ranges: elements without such soluble compounds tend to be either non-essential (Al) or, at best, may only be needed in traces (Si).

Essential elements for higher organisms (eucarya).
H																	He
Li	Be											B	C	N	O	F	Ne
Na	Mg											Al	Si	P	S	Cl	Ar
K	Ca	Sc	Ti	V	Cr	Mn	Fe	Co	Ni	Cu	Zn	Ga	Ge	As	Se	Br	Kr
Rb	Sr	Y	Zr	Nb	Mo	Tc	Ru	Rh	Pd	Ag	Cd	In	Sn	Sb	Te	I	Xe
Cs	Ba	Lu	Hf	Ta	W	Re	Os	Ir	Pt	Au	Hg	Tl	Pb	Bi	Po	At	Rn

Legend:
The four basic organic elements
Quantity elements
Essential trace elements
Essentiality or function debated
Not essential in humans, but essential/beneficial for some non-human eucarya

=== Roles in biological processes ===
Dietary element	RDA/AI male/female (US) [mg]	UL (US and EU) [mg]	Category	High nutrient density dietary sources	Terms for deficiency/excess
Potassium	4700	NE; NE	A systemic electrolyte and is essential in coregulating ATP with sodium	Sweet potato, tomato, potato, beans, lentils, dairy products, seafood, banana, prune, carrot, orange	hypokalemia / hyperkalemia
Chlorine	2300	3600; NE	Needed for production of hydrochloric acid in the stomach, in cellular pump functions and required in host defense	Table salt (sodium chloride) is the main dietary source.	hypochloremia / hyperchloremia
Sodium	1500	2300; NE	A systemic electrolyte and is essential in coregulating ATP with potassium	Table salt (sodium chloride, the main source), sea vegetables, milk, and spinach.	hyponatremia / hypernatremia
Calcium	1000	2500; 2500	Needed for muscle, heart and digestive system health, builds bone (see hydroxyapatite), supports synthesis and function of blood cells, helps in blood clotting	Dairy products, eggs, canned fish with bones (salmon, sardines), green leafy vegetables, nuts, seeds, tofu, thyme, oregano, dill, cinnamon.	hypocalcaemia / hypercalcaemia
Phosphorus	700	4000; 4000	A component of bones (see hydroxyapatite), cells, in energy processing, in DNA and ATP (as phosphate) and many other functions	Red meat, dairy foods, fish, poultry, bread, rice, oats. In biological contexts, usually seen as phosphate	hypophosphatemia / hyperphosphatemia
Magnesium	420/320	350; 250	Required for processing ATP and for bones	Spinach, legumes, nuts, seeds, whole grains, peanut butter, avocado	hypomagnesemia (magnesium deficiency) / hypermagnesemia
Iron	8/18	45; NE	Required for many proteins and enzymes, notably hemoglobin to prevent anemia	Meat, seafood, nuts, beans, dark chocolate	iron deficiency / iron overload disorder
Zinc	11/8	40; 25	Required for several classes of enzymes such as matrix metalloproteinases, liver alcohol dehydrogenase, carbonic anhydrase and zinc finger proteins	Oysters*, red meat, poultry, nuts, whole grains, dairy products	zinc deficiency / zinc toxicity
Manganese	2.3/1.8	11; NE	Required co-factor for superoxide dismutase	Grains, legumes, seeds, nuts, leafy vegetables, tea, coffee	manganese deficiency / manganism
Copper	0.9	10; 5	Required co-factor for cytochrome c oxidase	Liver, seafood, oysters, nuts, seeds; some: whole grains, legumes	copper deficiency / copper toxicity
Iodine	0.150	1.1; 0.6	Required for the synthesis of thyroid hormones and to help enzymes in host defense	Seaweed (kelp or kombu)*, grains, eggs, iodized salt	iodine deficiency (goiter) / iodism (hyperthyroidism)
Molybdenum	0.045	2; 0.6	Required for the functioning of xanthine oxidase, aldehyde oxidase, and sulfite oxidase	Legumes, whole grains, nuts	molybdenum deficiency / molybdenum toxicity
Selenium	0.055	0.4; 0.3	Essential to activity of antioxidant enzymes like glutathione peroxidase	Brazil nuts, seafoods, organ meats, meats, grains, dairy products, eggs	selenium deficiency / selenosis
Cobalt	NE (trace); NE (trace)	NE; NE	Cobalt (as vitamin B_{12}) is required for the synthesis of DNA, erythropoiesis (red blood cell formation), and the development, myelination, and function of the central nervous system. It is available for use by animals only after having been processed by bacteria. Humans contain only milligrams of cobalt in these cofactors	Animal muscle and liver are good dietary sources, also shellfish and crab meat	pernicious anemia / cobalt poisoning
Sulfur	NE (abundant); NE (abundant)	NE; NE	Sulfur (as essential amino acid methionine and its derivative cysteine) is required for the synthesis of proteins, antioxidation, and the transcription, epigenetic expression, and gene regulation of DNA. It is unusual in that it is a mineral that may be taken in both inorganic and organic combinations. Sulfur is the most abundant mineral found in our body after calcium and phosphorus	Nuts, legumes, meats, eggs, fish, seafood, also fermented foods	compromised glutathione synthesis / hyperhomocysteinemia
Bromine	NE (trace); NE (trace)	NE; NE	Important to basement membrane architecture and tissue development, as a needed catalyst to make collagen IV		bromism

RDA = Recommended Dietary Allowance; AI = Adequate intake; UL = Tolerable upper intake level; Figures shown are for adults age 31–50, male or female neither pregnant nor lactating

* One serving of seaweed exceeds the US UL of 1100 μg but not the 3000 μg UL set by Japan.

== Dietary nutrition ==
Dietitians may recommend that minerals are best supplied by ingesting specific foods rich with the chemical element(s) of interest. The elements may be naturally present in the food (e.g., calcium in dairy milk) or added to the food (e.g., orange juice fortified with calcium; iodized salt fortified with iodine). Dietary supplements can be formulated to contain several different chemical elements (as compounds), a combination of vitamins and/or other chemical compounds, or a single element (as a compound or mixture of compounds), such as calcium (calcium carbonate, calcium citrate) or magnesium (magnesium oxide), or iron (ferrous sulfate, iron bis-glycinate).

The dietary focus on chemical elements derives from an interest in supporting the biochemical reactions of metabolism with the required elemental components. Appropriate intake levels of certain chemical elements have been demonstrated to be required to maintain optimal health. Diet can meet all the body's chemical element requirements, although supplements can be used when some recommendations are not adequately met by the diet. An example would be a diet low in dairy products, and hence not meeting the recommendation for calcium.

== Plants ==
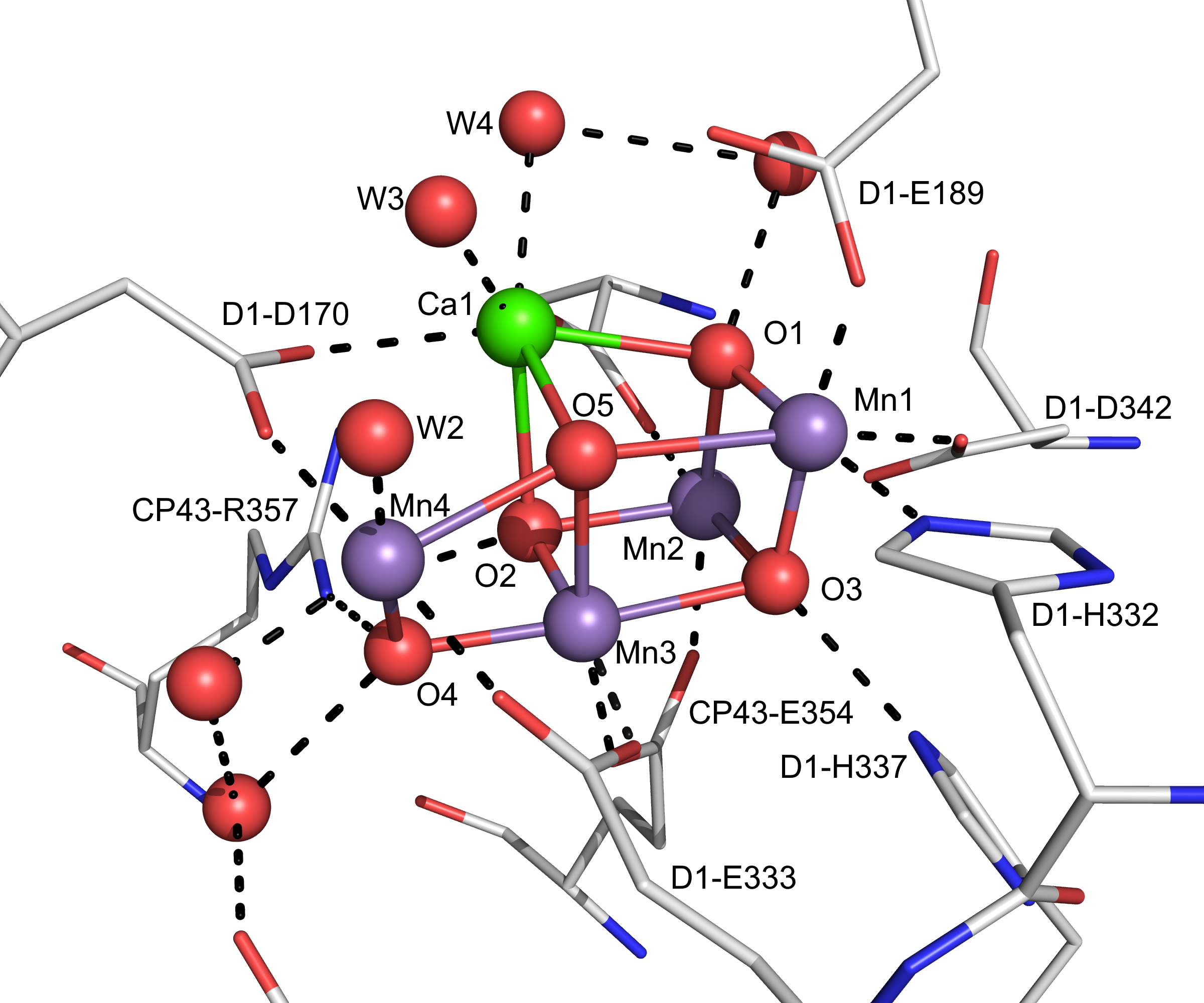
Structure of the Mn_{4}O_{5}Ca core of the oxygen-evolving site in plants, illustrating one of many roles of the trace mineral manganese.

The list of minerals required for plants is similar to that for animals. Both use very similar enzymes, although differences exist. For example, legumes host molybdenum-containing nitrogenase, but animals do not. Many animals rely on hemoglobin (Fe) for oxygen transport, but plants do not. Fertilizers are often tailored to address mineral deficiencies in particular soils. Examples include molybdenum deficiency, manganese deficiency, zinc deficiency, and so on.

=== Safety ===
The gap between recommended daily intake and what are considered safe upper limits (ULs) can be small. For example, for calcium the U.S. Food and Drug Administration set the recommended intake for adults over 70 years at 1,200 mg/day and the UL at 2,000 mg/day. The European Union also sets recommended amounts and upper limits, which are not always in accord with the U.S. Likewise, Japan, which sets the UL for iodine at 3000 μg versus 1100 for the U.S. and 600 for the EU. In the table above, magnesium appears to be an anomaly as the recommended intake for adult men is 420 mg/day (women 350 mg/day) while the UL is lower than the recommended, at 350 mg. The reason is that the UL is specific to consuming more than 350 mg of magnesium all at once, in the form of a dietary supplement, as this may cause diarrhea. Magnesium-rich foods do not cause this problem.

== Elements considered possibly essential for humans but not confirmed ==
Many ultratrace elements have been suggested as essential, but such claims have usually not been confirmed. Definitive evidence for efficacy comes from the characterization of a biomolecule containing the element with an identifiable and testable function. One problem with identifying efficacy is that some elements are innocuous at low concentrations and are pervasive (examples: silicon and nickel in solid and dust), so proof of efficacy is lacking because deficiencies are difficult to reproduce. Some elements were once thought to have a role with unknown biochemical nature, but the evidence has not always been strong. For example, it was once thought that arsenic was probably essential in mammals, but it seems to be only used by microbes; and while chromium was long thought to be an essential trace element based on rodent models, and was proposed to be involved in glucose and lipid metabolism, more recent studies have called this into question. It may still have a role in insulin signalling, but the evidence is not clear, and it only seems to occur at doses not found in normal diets. Boron is essential to plants, but not humans, although depletion-repletion studies in humans showed benefits to bone and brain health.

Non-essential elements can sometimes appear in the body when they are chemically similar to essential elements (e.g. Rb^{+} and Cs^{+} replacing Na^{+}), so that essentiality is not the same thing as uptake by a biological system.

Element	Description	Excess
Nickel	Nickel is an essential component of several enzymes, including urease and hydrogenase. Although not required by humans, some are thought to be required by gut bacteria, such as urease required by some varieties of Bifidobacterium. In humans, nickel may be a cofactor or structural component of certain metalloenzymes involved in hydrolysis, redox reactions and gene expression. Nickel deficiency depressed growth in goats, pigs, and sheep, and diminished circulating thyroid hormone concentration in rats.	Nickel toxicity
Fluorine	There is no evidence that fluorine is essential, but it is beneficial. Research indicates that the primary dental benefit from fluoride occurs at the surface from topical exposure. Of the minerals in this table, fluoride is the only one for which the U.S. Institute of Medicine has established an Adequate Intake.	Fluoride poisoning
Lithium	Based on plasma lithium concentrations, biological activity and epidemiological observations, there is evidence, not conclusive, that lithium is an essential nutrient.	Lithium toxicity
Silicon	Silicon is beneficial to most plants, but usually not essential. It seems to have beneficial effects in humans, strengthening bones and connective tissue, but these effects are still being studied. In any case deficiency symptoms do not arise because silicon occurs significantly in food made from plants.	
Vanadium	Has an established, albeit specialized, biochemical role in other organisms (algae, lichens, fungi, bacteria), and there is significant circumstantial evidence for its essentiality in humans. It is rather toxic for a trace element and the requirement, if essential, is probably small.	
Other	There are several elements that are not used by mammals, but seem to be beneficial in other organisms: boron, aluminium, titanium, arsenic, rubidium, strontium, cadmium, antimony, tellurium, barium, the early lanthanides (from lanthanum to gadolinium), tungsten, and uranium. (In the cases of Al and Rb the mechanism is not well understood.) In particular, B, Ti, Sr, Cd, and Ba are used by eukaryotes, and Al and Rb might be as well.	

== Mineral ecology ==
Diverse ions are used by animals and microorganisms for the process of mineralizing structures, called biomineralization, used to construct bones, seashells, eggshells, exoskeletons and mollusc shells.

Minerals can be bioengineered by bacteria which act on metals to catalyze mineral dissolution and precipitation. Mineral nutrients are recycled by bacteria distributed throughout soils, oceans, freshwater, groundwater, and glacier meltwater systems worldwide. Bacteria absorb dissolved organic matter containing minerals as they scavenge phytoplankton blooms. Mineral nutrients cycle through this marine food chain, from bacteria and phytoplankton to flagellates and zooplankton, which are then eaten by other marine life. In terrestrial ecosystems, fungi have similar roles as bacteria, mobilizing minerals from matter inaccessible by other organisms, then transporting the acquired nutrients to local ecosystems.

== See also ==
- Food composition
- Human nutrition
- Micronutrient
- Mineral deficiency
