= MOCS3 =

Protein-coding gene in the species Homo sapiens

Identifiers
- Aliases: MOCS3, UBA4, molybdenum cofactor synthesis 3
- External IDs: OMIM: 609277; MGI: 1916622; GeneCards: MOCS3
Available structures
PDB	Ortholog search: PDBe RCSB
PDB	List of PDB id codes 3I2V
Enzyme activity
EC #	BRENDA	ExPASy	KEGG	MetaCyc
2.7.7.80	↗	↗	↗	↗
2.8.1.11	↗	↗	↗	↗

Gene location (Human)
Chr.	Chromosome 20 (human)
Band	20q13.13	Start	50,958,818 bp
Band	20q13.13	End	50,963,929 bp

Gene location (Mouse)
Chr.	Chromosome 2 (mouse)
Band	2|2 H3	Start	168,072,542 bp
Band	2|2 H3	End	168,074,514 bp
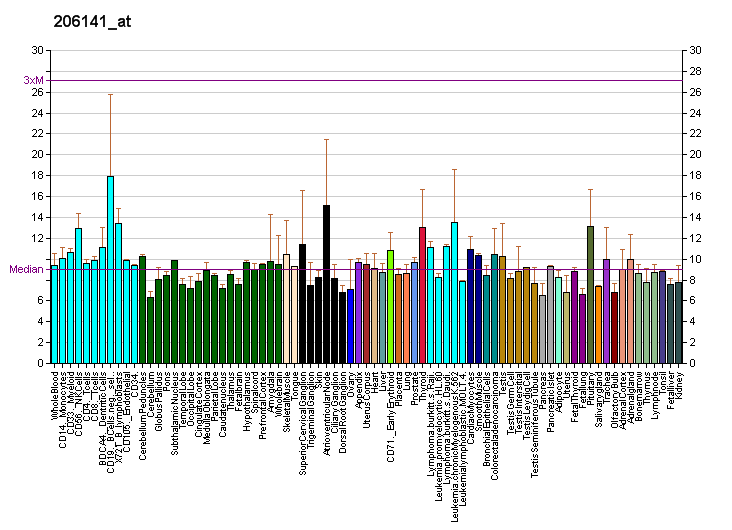
RNA expression pattern
Bgee	Human / Mouse (ortholog); Top expressed in: sperm; testicle; stromal cell of endometrium; gonad; ventricular zone; ganglionic eminence; islet of Langerhans; gastrocnemius muscle; nasal epithelium; prefrontal cortex / Top expressed in: seminiferous tubule; spermatid; spermatocyte; muscle of thigh; right kidney; granulocyte; embryo; primary visual cortex; proximal tubule; mesenteric lymph nodes; More reference expression data
BioGPS	More reference expression data
Gene ontology
Molecular function	transferase activity; nucleotide binding; thiosulfate sulfurtransferase activity; molybdopterin-synthase sulfurtransferase activity; metal ion binding; URM1 activating enzyme activity; protein binding; catalytic activity; ubiquitin-like modifier activating enzyme activity; ATP binding; molybdopterin-synthase adenylyltransferase activity; nucleotidyltransferase activity; sulfurtransferase activity
Cellular component	cytoplasm; cytosol
Biological process	molybdopterin cofactor biosynthetic process; tRNA processing; Mo-molybdopterin cofactor biosynthetic process; metabolism; tRNA wobble uridine modification; tRNA thio-modification; tRNA wobble position uridine thiolation; protein urmylation
Sources:Amigo / QuickGO
Orthologs
Databases	NCBI: entry; OMA: entry
Species	Human	Mouse
Entrez	27304	69372
Ensembl	ENSG00000124217	ENSMUSG00000074576
UniProt	O95396	A2BDX3
RefSeq (mRNA)	NM_014484	NM_001160330
RefSeq (protein)	NP_055299	NP_001153802
Location (UCSC)	Chr 20: 50.96 – 50.96 Mb	Chr 2: 168.07 – 168.07 Mb
PubMed search
- Wikidata
View/Edit Human	View/Edit Mouse

Adenylyltransferase and sulfurtransferase MOCS3 is an enzyme that in humans is encoded by the MOCS3 gene.

Molybdenum cofactor (MoCo) is necessary for the function of all molybdoenzymes. One of the enzymes required for the biosynthesis of MoCo is molybdopterin synthase (MPT synthase, encoded by MOCS2/Mocs2 in mammals). The protein encoded by this gene adenylates and activates MPT synthase. This gene contains no introns. A pseudogene of this gene is present on chromosome 14.
