= C10H14N5O8P =

The molecular formula C_{10}H_{14}N_{5}O_{8}P (molar mass: 363.22 g/mol) may refer to:

- Cyclic pyranopterin monophosphate
- Guanosine monophosphate
