= Mixing time =

Mixing time may refer to:

- Blend time, the time to achieve a predefined level of homogeneity of a flow tracer in a mixing vessel
- Mixing (mathematics), an abstract concept originating from physics used to attempt to describe the irreversible thermodynamic process of mixing
- Markov chain mixing time, the time to achieve a level of homogeneity in the probability distribution of a state in a Markov process
