= MOAA =

MOAA may refer to:

- Military Officers Association of America
- Cyclic pyranopterin monophosphate synthase, an enzyme
