= MOCS1 =

Protein-coding gene in the species Homo sapiens

Identifiers
- Aliases: MOCS1, MIG11, MOCOD, MOCODA, molybdenum cofactor synthesis 1, MOCS1A, MOCS1B
- External IDs: OMIM: 603707; MGI: 1928904; HomoloGene: 129502; GeneCards: MOCS1; OMA:MOCS1 - orthologs

Gene location (Human)
Chr.	Chromosome 6 (human)
Band	6p21.2	Start	39,899,578 bp
Band	6p21.2	End	39,934,551 bp

Gene location (Mouse)
Chr.	Chromosome 17 (mouse)
Band	17|17 C	Start	49,735,390 bp
Band	17|17 C	End	49,762,463 bp
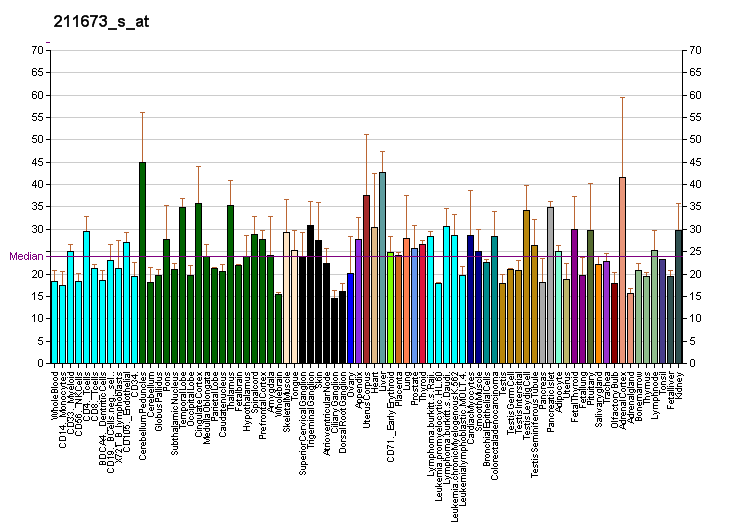

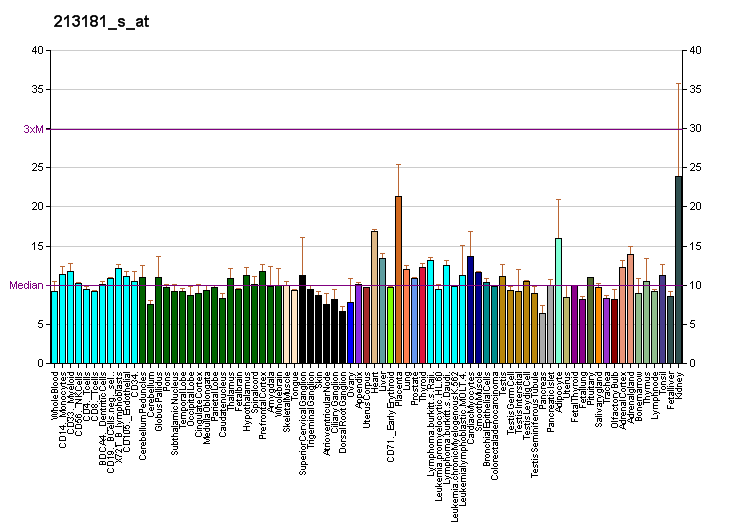
RNA expression pattern
Bgee	Human / Mouse (ortholog); Top expressed in: apex of heart; popliteal artery; tibial arteries; right lung; pancreatic ductal cell; right lobe of liver; subcutaneous adipose tissue; mucosa of transverse colon; gastrocnemius muscle; tibial nerve / Top expressed in: granulocyte; muscle of thigh; tail of embryo; lip; genital tubercle; right kidney; esophagus; ascending aorta; left lobe of liver; duodenum; More reference expression data
BioGPS	More reference expression data
Gene ontology
Molecular function	metal ion binding; nucleotide binding; 4 iron, 4 sulfur cluster binding; catalytic activity; lyase activity; GTP binding; iron-sulfur cluster binding; GTP 3',8'-cyclase activity; cyclic pyranopterin monophosphate synthase activity
Cellular component	molybdopterin synthase complex; cytosol; nucleus
Biological process	Mo-molybdopterin cofactor biosynthetic process; molybdopterin cofactor biosynthetic process
Sources:Amigo / QuickGO
Orthologs
Species	Human	Mouse
Entrez	4337	56738
Ensembl	ENSG00000124615	ENSMUSG00000064120
UniProt	Q9NZB8	Q5RKZ7
RefSeq (mRNA)	NM_001075098; NM_005942; NM_005943; NM_138928; NM_001358529 NM_001358530; NM_001358531; NM_001358533; NM_001358534	NM_020042; NM_028464
RefSeq (protein)	NP_001068566; NP_005934; NP_001345458; NP_001345459; NP_001345460 NP_001345462; NP_001345463	NP_064426; NP_082740
Location (UCSC)	Chr 6: 39.9 – 39.93 Mb	Chr 17: 49.74 – 49.76 Mb
PubMed search
- Wikidata
View/Edit Human	View/Edit Mouse

Molybdenum cofactor biosynthesis protein 1 is a protein that in humans and other animals, fungi, and cellular slime molds, is encoded by the MOCS1 gene.

Both copies of this gene are defective in patients with molybdenum cofactor deficiency, type A.

Molybdenum cofactor biosynthesis is a conserved pathway leading to the biological activation of molybdenum. The gene contains two open reading frames, termed MOCS1A and MOCS1B. The former is a GTP 3',8-cyclase homologous to MoaA, the latter a cyclic pyranopterin monophosphate synthase homologous to MoaC. The two work in series in the biosynthetic pathway.

The gene has a complex pattern of alternative splicing. MOCS1A is produced by a splice variant that appears to be a bicistronic mRNA containing both ORFs, but this mRNA actually only translates to MOCS1A. Two of the splice variants found for this gene express proteins (MOCS1A-MOCS1B) that result from a fusion between the two open reading frames; active MOCS1B is only produced in a form preceded by an inactive version of MOCS1A.
