= Peter Jacob Hjelm =

Swedish chemist (1746–1813)

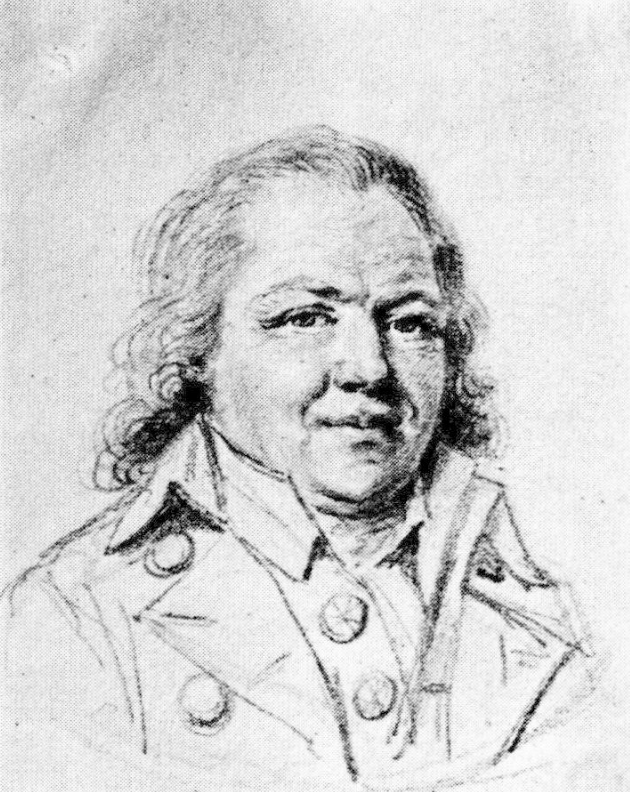
- Engraving by Anton Ulrik Berndes, c. 1800
- Born: 2 October 1746; Sunnerbo härad, Småland, Sweden
- Died: 7 October 1813 (aged 67); Stockholm, Sweden
- Education: University of Uppsala

Peter (Petter) Jacob Hjelm (2 October 1746 – 7 October 1813) was a Swedish chemist and the first person to isolate the element molybdenum in 1781, four years after its discovery by Swedish chemist Carl Wilhelm Scheele. Working with Molybdic acid, Hjelm chemically reduced molybdenum oxide with carbon in an oxygen-free atmosphere, resulting in carbon dioxide and a near-pure dark metal powder to which he gave the name 'molybdenum'. His first publication on molybdenum appeared in 1790.

== Childhood ==
Hjelm was born at Sunnerbo in Småland, Sweden in 1746. The son of parish priest Erik Hjelm and Cecilia Cecilia Gistrénia, he was raised in the parish of Göteryd in Älmhult.

== Career ==
After studying at the University of Uppsala, he received his Ph.D. He became professor at the Mining academy and in 1782 he became Proberare of the Royal Mint, with the job of analyzing minerals to determine their content. From 1784 on he was a member of the Royal Swedish Academy of Sciences. His last position was as director of the Chemical Laboratory at the Ministry of Mining.

== Literature ==
- Friedrich, Christoph (1989). "Deutsch-schwedische Wissenschaftsbeziehungen an der Universität Greifswald zwischen 1770 und 1850 unter besonderer Berücksichtigung von Chemie und Pharmazie". Berichte zur Wissenschaftsgeschichte. 12 (3): 177–192. doi:10.1002/bewi.19890120307. PMID 11629776.
