= Molybdenum =

Molybdenum, _{42}Mo
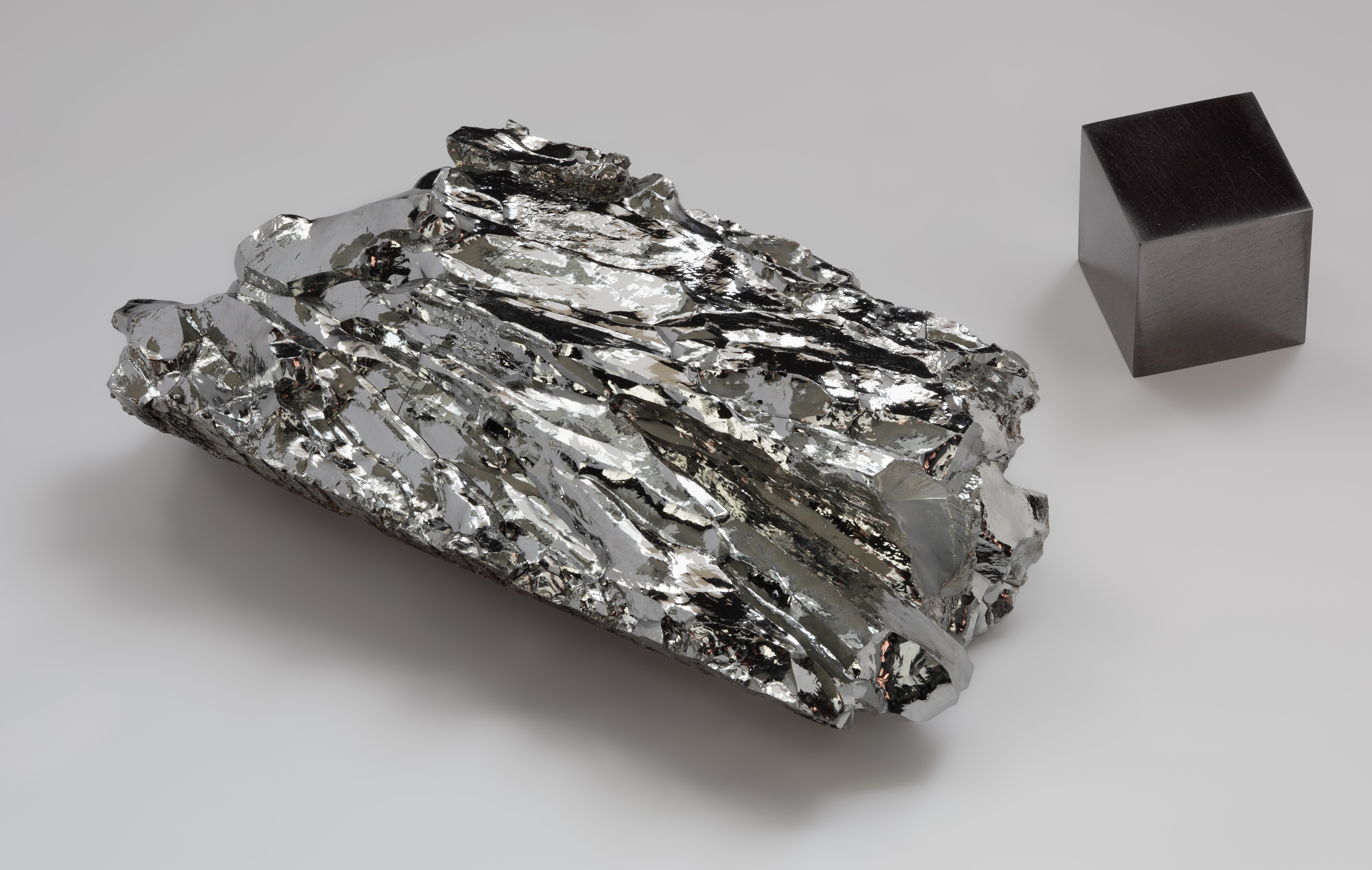

Molybdenum
- Pronunciation: /məˈlɪbdənəm/ (mə-LIB-də-nəm)
- Appearance: gray metallic

Standard atomic weight A_{r}°(Mo)
- 95.95±0.01; 95.95±0.01 (abridged)

Molybdenum in the periodic table
| Hydrogen | | | | | | | | | | | | | | | | | | | | | | | | | | | | | | | Helium |
| Lithium | Beryllium | | | | | | | | | | | | | | | | | | | | | | | | | Boron | Carbon | Nitrogen | Oxygen | Fluorine | Neon |
| Sodium | Magnesium | | | | | | | | | | | | | | | | | | | | | | | | | Aluminium | Silicon | Phosphorus | Sulfur | Chlorine | Argon |
| Potassium | Calcium | | | | | | | | | | | | | | | Scandium | Titanium | Vanadium | Chromium | Manganese | Iron | Cobalt | Nickel | Copper | Zinc | Gallium | Germanium | Arsenic | Selenium | Bromine | Krypton |
| Rubidium | Strontium | | | | | | | | | | | | | | | Yttrium | Zirconium | Niobium | Molybdenum | Technetium | Ruthenium | Rhodium | Palladium | Silver | Cadmium | Indium | Tin | Antimony | Tellurium | Iodine | Xenon |
| Caesium | Barium | Lanthanum | Cerium | Praseodymium | Neodymium | Promethium | Samarium | Europium | Gadolinium | Terbium | Dysprosium | Holmium | Erbium | Thulium | Ytterbium | Lutetium | Hafnium | Tantalum | Tungsten | Rhenium | Osmium | Iridium | Platinum | Gold | Mercury (element) | Thallium | Lead | Bismuth | Polonium | Astatine | Radon |
| Francium | Radium | Actinium | Thorium | Protactinium | Uranium | Neptunium | Plutonium | Americium | Curium | Berkelium | Californium | Einsteinium | Fermium | Mendelevium | Nobelium | Lawrencium | Rutherfordium | Dubnium | Seaborgium | Bohrium | Hassium | Meitnerium | Darmstadtium | Roentgenium | Copernicium | Nihonium | Flerovium | Moscovium | Livermorium | Tennessine | Oganesson |
Cr
↑
Mo
↓
W
niobium ← molybdenum → technetium
- Atomic number (Z): 42
- Group: group 6
- Period: period 5
- Block: d-block
- Electron configuration: [Kr] 4d^{5} 5s^{1}
- Electrons per shell: 2, 8, 18, 13, 1

Physical properties
- Phase at STP: solid
- Melting point: 2896 K (2623 °C, 4753 °F)
- Boiling point: 4912 K (4639 °C, 8382 °F)
- Density (at 20° C): 10.223 g/cm^{3}
- when liquid (at m.p.): 9.33 g/cm^{3}
- Heat of fusion: 37.48 kJ/mol
- Heat of vaporization: 598 kJ/mol
- Molar heat capacity: 24.06 J/(mol·K)
- Specific heat capacity: 250.756 J/(kg·K)
Vapor pressure
| P (Pa) | 1 | 10 | 100 | 1 k | 10 k | 100 k |
|---|---|---|---|---|---|---|
| at T (K) | 2742 | 2994 | 3312 | 3707 | 4212 | 4879 |

Atomic properties
- Oxidation states: common: +4, +6 −4, −2, −1, 0, +1, +2, +3, +5
- Electronegativity: Pauling scale: 2.16
- Ionization energies: 1st: 684.3 kJ/mol; 2nd: 1560 kJ/mol; 3rd: 2618 kJ/mol
- Atomic radius: empirical: 139 pm
- Covalent radius: 154±5 pm
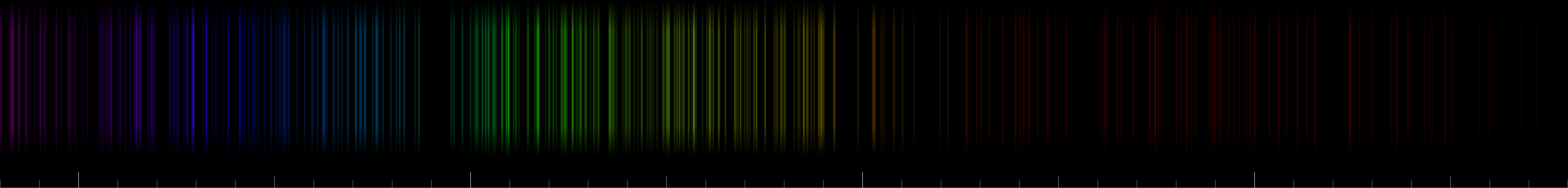
- Spectral lines of molybdenum

Other properties
- Natural occurrence: primordial
- Crystal structure: body-centered cubic (bcc) (cI2)
- Lattice constant: a = 314.71 pm (at 20 °C)
- Thermal expansion: 5.10×10^{−6}/K (at 20 °C)
- Thermal conductivity: 138 W/(m⋅K)
- Thermal diffusivity: 54.3 mm^{2}/s (at 300 K)
- Electrical resistivity: 53.4 nΩ⋅m (at 20 °C)
- Magnetic ordering: paramagnetic
- Molar magnetic susceptibility: +89.0×10^{−6} cm^{3}/mol (298 K)
- Young's modulus: 329 GPa
- Shear modulus: 126 GPa
- Bulk modulus: 230 GPa
- Speed of sound thin rod: 5400 m/s (at r.t.)
- Poisson ratio: 0.31
- Mohs hardness: 5.5
- Vickers hardness: 1400–2740 MPa
- Brinell hardness: 1370–2500 MPa
- CAS Number: 7439-98-7

History
- Naming: from Greek Μόλυβδος, 'lead', since its ores were confused with lead ores
- Discovery: Carl Wilhelm Scheele (1778)
- First isolation: Peter Jacob Hjelm (1781)

Isotopes of molybdenum
| Main isotopes | | | Decay | |
| Isotope | abundance | half-life (t_{1/2}) | mode | product |
|---|---|---|---|---|
| ^{92}Mo | 14.65% | stable | | |
| ^{93}Mo | synth | 4839 y | ε | ^{93}Nb |
| ^{94}Mo | 9.19% | stable | | |
| ^{95}Mo | 15.87% | stable | | |
| ^{96}Mo | 16.67% | stable | | |
| ^{97}Mo | 9.58% | stable | | |
| ^{98}Mo | 24.29% | stable | | |
| ^{99}Mo | synth | 65.932 h | β^{−} | ^{99m}Tc |
| ^{100}Mo | 9.74% | 7.07×10^{18} y | β^{−}β^{−} | ^{100}Ru |

Molybdenum is a chemical element; it has symbol Mo and atomic number 42. The name is derived from Ancient Greek μόλυβδος mólybdos, meaning lead, since its ores were sometimes confused with those of lead. Molybdenum minerals have been known throughout history, but the element was discovered (in the sense of differentiating it as a new entity from the mineral salts of other metals) in 1778 by Carl Wilhelm Scheele. The metal was first isolated in 1781 by Peter Jacob Hjelm.

Molybdenum does not occur naturally as a free metal on Earth; in its minerals, it is found only in oxidized states. The free element, a silvery metal with a grey cast, has the sixth-highest melting point of any element. It readily forms hard, stable carbides in alloys, and for this reason most of the world production of the element (about 80%) is used in steel alloys, including high-strength alloys and superalloys.

Most molybdenum compounds have low solubility in water. Heating molybdenum-bearing minerals under oxygen and water affords molybdate ion MoO^{2−}_{4}, which forms quite soluble salts. Industrially, molybdenum compounds (about 14% of world production of the element) are used as pigments and catalysts.

Molybdenum-bearing enzymes are by far the most common bacterial catalysts for breaking the chemical bond in atmospheric molecular nitrogen in the process of biological nitrogen fixation. At least 50 molybdenum enzymes are now known in bacteria, plants, and animals, although only bacterial and cyanobacterial enzymes are involved in nitrogen fixation. Most nitrogenases contain an iron–molybdenum cofactor FeMoco, which is believed to contain either Mo(III) or Mo(IV). By contrast Mo(VI) and Mo(IV) are complexed with molybdopterin in all other molybdenum-bearing enzymes. Molybdenum is an essential element for all higher eukaryote organisms, including humans. A species of sponge, Theonella conica, is known for hyperaccumulation of molybdenum.

== Characteristics ==
=== Physical properties ===
In its pure form, molybdenum is a silvery-grey metal with a Mohs hardness of 5.5 and a standard atomic weight of 95.95 g/mol. It has a melting point of 2,623 °C (4,753 °F), sixth highest of the naturally occurring elements; only tantalum, osmium, rhenium, tungsten, and carbon have higher melting points. It has one of the lowest coefficients of thermal expansion among commercially used metals.

=== Chemical properties ===
Molybdenum is a transition metal with an electronegativity of 2.16 on the Pauling scale. It does not visibly react with oxygen or water at room temperature, but is attacked by halogens and hydrogen peroxide. Weak oxidation of molybdenum starts at 300 °C (572 °F); bulk oxidation occurs at temperatures above 600 °C, resulting in molybdenum trioxide. Like many heavier transition metals, molybdenum shows little inclination to form a cation in aqueous solution, although the Mo^{3+} cation is known to form under carefully controlled conditions.

Gaseous molybdenum consists of the diatomic species Mo_{2}. That molecule is a singlet, with two unpaired electrons in bonding orbitals, in addition to 5 conventional bonds. The result is a sextuple bond.

=== Isotopes ===
There are 39 known isotopes of molybdenum, ranging in atomic mass from 81 to 119, as well as 13 metastable nuclear isomers. Seven isotopes occur naturally, with atomic masses of 92, 94, 95, 96, 97, 98, and 100. Molybdenum-98 is the most abundant, comprising 24.14% of natural molybdenum, and only molybdenum-100 is unstable; it undergoes double beta decay into ruthenium-100 with half-life 7.07×10^{18} years.

All the synthetic isotopes of molybdenum decay into isotopes of niobium, technetium, or zirconium. The most stable of them is ^{93}Mo, with a half-life of 4,839 years to electron capture, giving stable niobium.

The most common isotopic molybdenum application involves molybdenum-99, which is a fission product. It is a parent radioisotope to the short-lived gamma-emitting daughter radioisotope technetium-99m, a nuclear isomer used in various imaging applications in medicine.

=== Redox buffer in the irradiated fuel matrix ===
Molybdenum behaves as a redox buffer in the spent nuclear fuel matrix. ^{99}Mo is one of the most abundant fission product, with a fission yield of 6.1% close to that of xenon (^{135}Xe, 6.33%). Molybdenum plays a critical role in nuclear fuel chemistry because it affects the fuel's oxygen fugacity. Molybdenum produced by nuclear fission in the fuel matrix inhibits the oxidation of the uranium dioxide.

== Compounds ==
Molybdenum forms chemical compounds in oxidation states −4 and from −2 to +6. Higher oxidation states are more relevant to its terrestrial occurrence and its biological roles, mid-level oxidation states are often associated with metal clusters, and very low oxidation states are typically associated with organomolybdenum compounds. The chemistry of molybdenum and tungsten show strong similarities. The relative rarity of molybdenum(III), for example, contrasts with the pervasiveness of the chromium(III) compounds. The highest oxidation state is seen in molybdenum(VI) oxide (MoO_{3}), whereas the normal sulfur compound is molybdenum disulfide MoS_{2}.

| Oxidation state | Example |
|---|---|
| −4 | Na_{4}[Mo(CO)_{4}] |
| −2 | [Mo(CO)_{5}]^{2−} |
| −1 | Na_{2}[Mo_{2}(CO)_{10}] |
| 0 | Mo(CO)_{6} |
| +1 | C_{5}H_{5}Mo(CO)_{3} |
| +2 | MoCl_{2} |
| +3 | MoBr_{3} |
| **+4** | MoS_{2} |
| +5 | MoCl_{5} |
| **+6** | MoF_{6} |

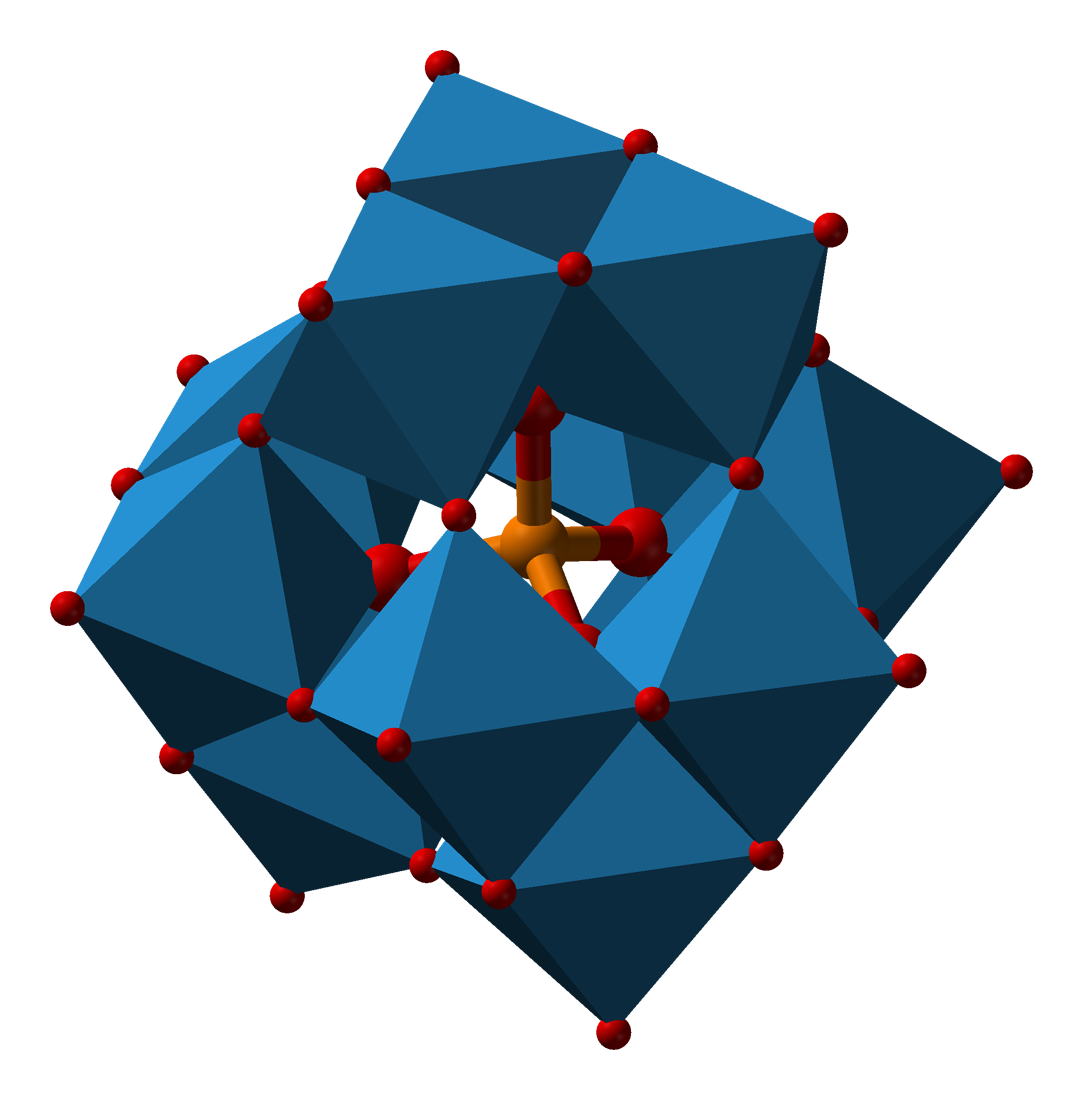
Keggin structure of the phosphomolybdate anion (P[Mo_{12}O_{40}]^{3−}), an example of a polyoxometalate

From the perspective of commerce, the most important compounds are molybdenum disulfide (MoS_{2}) and molybdenum trioxide (MoO_{3}). The black disulfide is the main mineral. It is roasted in air to give the trioxide:

2 MoS_{2} + 7 O_{2} → 2 MoO_{3} + 4 SO_{2}

The trioxide, which is volatile at high temperatures, is the precursor to virtually all other Mo compounds as well as alloys. Molybdenum has several oxidation states, the most stable being +4 and +6 (bolded in the table at left).

Molybdenum(VI) oxide is soluble in strong alkaline water, forming molybdates (MoO_{4}^{2−}). Molybdates are weaker oxidants than chromates. They tend to form structurally complex oxyanions by condensation at lower pH values, such as [Mo_{7}O_{24}]^{6−} and [Mo_{8}O_{26}]^{4−}. Polymolybdates can incorporate other ions, forming polyoxometalates. The dark-blue phosphorus-containing heteropolymolybdate P[Mo_{12}O_{40}]^{3−} is used for the spectroscopic detection of phosphorus.

The broad range of oxidation states of molybdenum is reflected in various molybdenum chlorides:

- Molybdenum(II) chloride MoCl_{2}, which exists as the hexamer Mo_{6}Cl_{12} and the related dianion [Mo_{6}Cl_{14}]^{2-}.
- Molybdenum(III) chloride MoCl_{3}, a dark red solid, which converts to the anion trianionic complex [MoCl_{6}]^{3-}.
- Molybdenum(IV) chloride MoCl_{4}, a black solid, which adopts a polymeric structure.
- Molybdenum(V) chloride MoCl_{5} dark green solid, which adopts a dimeric structure.
- Molybdenum(VI) chloride MoCl_{6} is a black solid, which is monomeric and slowly decomposes to MoCl_{5} and Cl_{2} at room temperature.

The accessibility of these oxidation states depends quite strongly on the halide counterion: although molybdenum(VI) fluoride is stable, molybdenum does not form a stable hexachloride, pentabromide, or tetraiodide.

Like chromium and some other transition metals, molybdenum forms quadruple bonds, such as in Mo_{2}(CH_{3}COO)_{4} and [Mo_{2}Cl_{8}]^{4−}. The Lewis acid properties of the butyrate and perfluorobutyrate dimers, Mo_{2}(O_{2}CR)_{4} and Rh_{2}(O_{2}CR) _{4}, have been reported.

The oxidation state 0 and lower are possible with carbon monoxide as ligand, such as in molybdenum hexacarbonyl, Mo(CO)_{6}.

== History ==
Molybdenite—the principal ore from which molybdenum is now extracted—was previously known as molybdena. Molybdena was confused with and often used as though it were graphite. Like graphite, molybdenite can be used to blacken a surface or as a solid lubricant. Even when molybdena was distinguishable from graphite, it was still confused with the common lead ore PbS (now called galena); the name comes from Ancient Greek μόλυβδος mólybdos, meaning lead. (The Greek word itself has been proposed as a loanword from Anatolian Luvian and Lydian languages).

Although (reportedly) molybdenum was deliberately alloyed with steel in one 14th-century Japanese sword (mfd. c. 1330), that art was never employed widely and was later lost. In the West in 1754, Bengt Andersson Qvist examined a sample of molybdenite and determined that it did not contain lead and thus was not galena.

By 1778 Swedish chemist Carl Wilhelm Scheele stated firmly that molybdena was (indeed) neither galena nor graphite. Instead, Scheele correctly proposed that molybdena was an ore of a distinct new element, and from which it might be isolated. Peter Jacob Hjelm successfully isolated a metal he called molybdaenum using carbon and linseed oil in 1781.

For the next century, molybdenum had no industrial use. It was relatively scarce, the pure metal was difficult to extract, and the necessary techniques of metallurgy were immature. Early molybdenum steel alloys showed great promise of increased hardness, but efforts to manufacture the alloys on a large scale were hampered with inconsistent results, a tendency toward brittleness, and recrystallization. In 1906, William D. Coolidge filed a patent for rendering molybdenum ductile, leading to applications as a heating element for high-temperature furnaces and as a support for tungsten-filament light bulbs; oxide formation and degradation require that molybdenum be physically sealed or held in an inert gas. In 1913, Frank E. Elmore developed a froth flotation process to recover molybdenite from ores; flotation remains the primary isolation process.

During World War I, demand for molybdenum spiked; it was used both in armor plating and as a substitute for tungsten in high-speed steels. Some British tanks were protected by 75 mm (3 in) manganese steel plating, but this proved to be ineffective. The manganese steel plates were replaced with much lighter 25 mm (1.0 in) molybdenum steel plates allowing for higher speed, greater maneuverability, and better protection. The Germans also used molybdenum-doped steel for heavy artillery, like in the super-heavy howitzer Big Bertha, because traditional steel melts at the temperatures produced by the propellant of the one ton shell. After the war, demand plummeted until metallurgical advances allowed extensive development of peacetime applications. In World War II, molybdenum again saw strategic importance as a substitute for tungsten in steel alloys.

== Occurrence and production ==
Molybdenum production

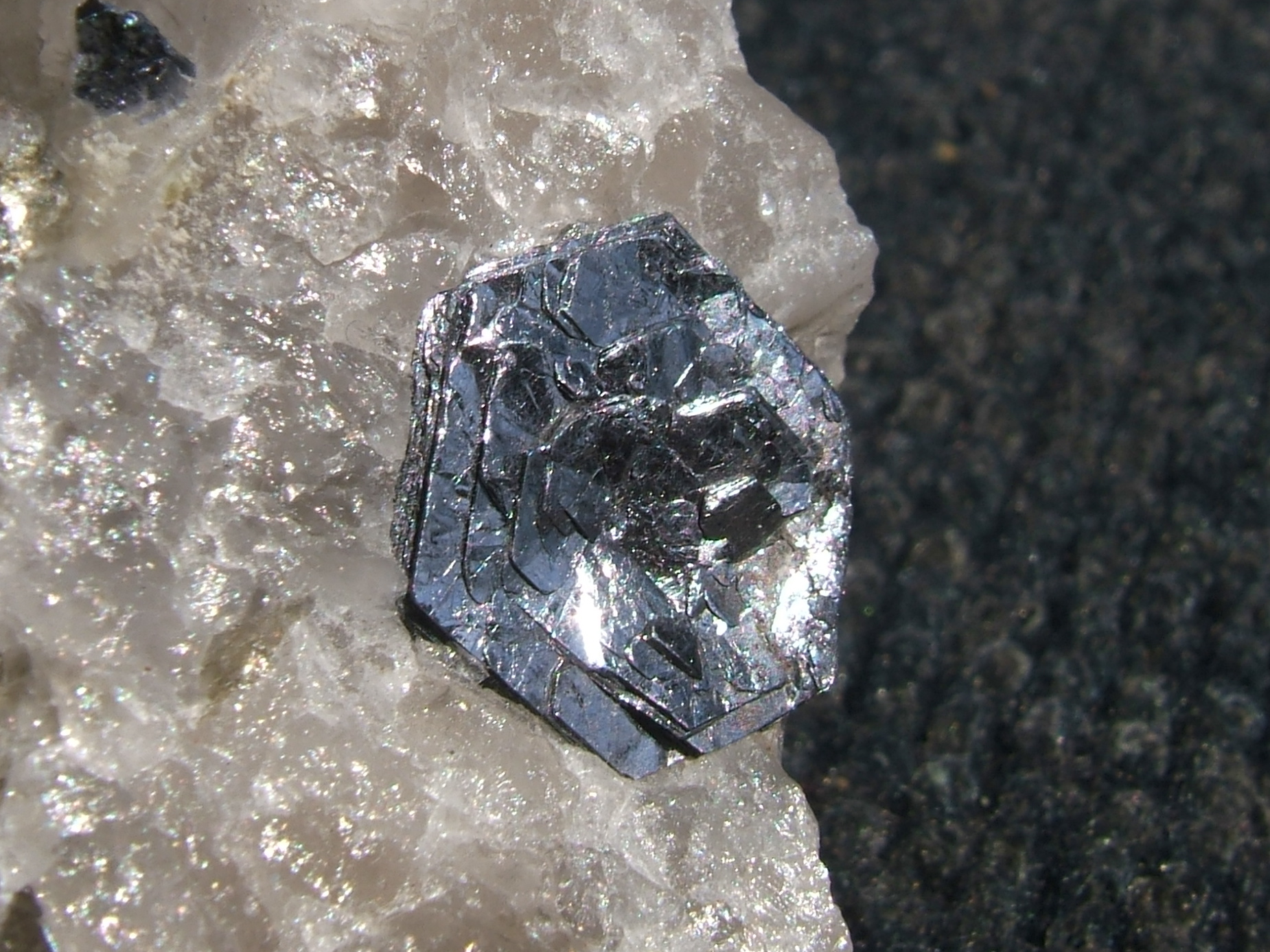
Molybdenite on quartz

Molybdenum is the 54th most abundant element in the Earth's crust with an average of 1.5 parts per million and the 25th most abundant element in the oceans, with an average of 10 parts per billion; it is the 42nd most abundant element in the Universe. The Soviet Luna 24 mission discovered a molybdenum-bearing grain (1 × 0.6 μm) in a pyroxene fragment taken from Mare Crisium on the Moon. The comparative rarity of molybdenum in the Earth's crust is offset by its concentration in a number of water-insoluble ores, often combined with sulfur in the same way as copper, with which it is often found. Though molybdenum is found in such minerals as wulfenite (PbMoO_{4}) and powellite (CaMoO_{4}), the main commercial source is molybdenite (MoS_{2}). Molybdenum is mined as a principal ore and is also recovered as a byproduct of copper and tungsten mining.

The world's production of molybdenum was 250,000 tonnes in 2011, the largest producers being China (94,000 t), the United States (64,000 t), Chile (38,000 t), Peru (18,000 t) and Mexico (12,000 t). The total reserves are estimated at 10 million tonnes, and are primarily concentrated in China (4.3 Mt), the US (2.7 Mt) and Chile (1.2 Mt). By continent, 93% of the world's molybdenum production is distributed approximately evenly among North America, South America (mainly Chile), and China. Europe and the rest of Asia (mostly Armenia, Russia, Iran and Mongolia) produce the remainder.

World production trend

In molybdenite processing, the ore is first roasted in air at 700 °C (1,292 °F). The process gives gaseous sulfur dioxide and the molybdenum(VI) oxide:

$$\ce{2MoS2 + 7O2 -> 2MoO3 + 4SO2}$$

The resulting oxide is then usually extracted with aqueous ammonia to give ammonium molybdate:

$$\ce{MoO3 + 2NH3 + H2O -> (NH4)2(MoO4)}$$

Copper, an impurity in molybdenite, is separated at this stage by treatment with hydrogen sulfide. Ammonium molybdate converts to ammonium dimolybdate, which is isolated as a solid. Heating this solid gives molybdenum trioxide:

$$\ce{(NH4)2Mo2O7 -> 2MoO3 + 2NH3 + H2O}$$

Crude trioxide can be further purified by sublimation at 1,100 °C (2,010 °F).

Metallic molybdenum is produced by the reduction of the oxide with hydrogen:

$$\ce{MoO3 + 3H2 -> Mo + 3H2O}$$

The molybdenum for steel production is reduced by the aluminothermic reaction with the addition of iron to produce ferromolybdenum. A common form of ferromolybdenum contains 60% molybdenum.

Molybdenum was valued at approximately $30,000 per tonne as of August 2009. It maintained a price at or near $10,000 per tonne from 1997 through 2003, and reached a peak of $103,000 per tonne in June 2005. In 2008, the London Metal Exchange announced that molybdenum would be traded as a commodity.

=== Mining ===
The Knaben mine in southern Norway, opened in 1885, was the first dedicated molybdenum mine. Closed in 1973 but reopened in 2007, it now produces 100,000 kilograms (98 long tons; 110 short tons) of molybdenum disulfide per year. Large mines in Colorado (such as the Henderson mine and the Climax mine) and in British Columbia yield molybdenite as their primary product, while many porphyry copper deposits such as the Bingham Canyon Mine in Utah and the Chuquicamata mine in northern Chile produce molybdenum as a byproduct of copper-mining.

=== Molybdenum traces in seawater ===
Mo is found in the oceans at an average submicromolar concentration of ~10^{−7} M.

Because it is present in seawater as molybdate (MoO^{2−}_{4}), a divalent oxyanion, it is not sorbed onto negatively charged clay minerals and interacts weakly with negatively charged particulate organic matter (POM). Therefore, it behaves as a conservative trace metal. Molybdenum is a transition metal that is evenly and consistently distributed in the oceans, similar to conservative tracers such as the chloride anion or deuterated water.

Transition metals that exist as negatively charged species have oceanic residence times exceeding 10,000 years, which is much longer than the ocean's mixing time. They maintain concentrations that remain relatively constant with respect to salinity over long periods. Mo has an oceanic residence time of 80,000 years. It shows an almost even distribution across the oceans, with only a slight decrease near the surface.

These characteristics make molybdenum likely the most crucial transition metal in seawater, as marine geochemists can use it as a stable reference tracer for other transition metals at trace levels.

== Applications ==
=== Alloys ===
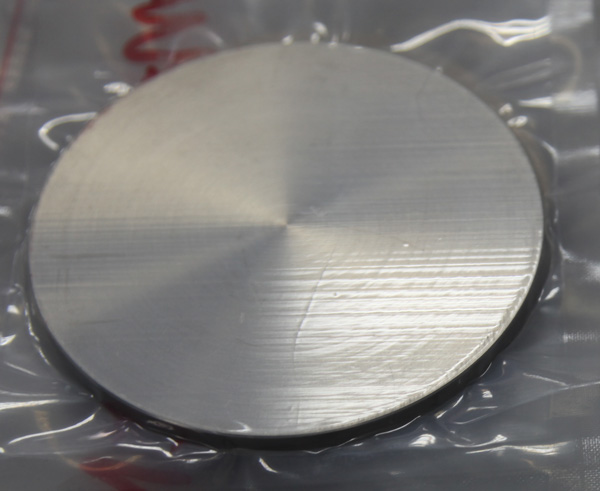
A plate of molybdenum copper alloy

About 86% of molybdenum produced is used in metallurgy, with the rest used in chemical applications. The estimated global use is structural steel 35%, stainless steel 25%, chemicals 14%, tool & high-speed steels 9%, cast iron 6%, molybdenum elemental metal 6%, and superalloys 5%.

Molybdenum can withstand extreme temperatures without significantly expanding or softening, making it useful in environments of intense heat, including military armor, aircraft parts, electrical contacts, industrial motors, and supports for filaments in light bulbs.

Most high-strength steel alloys (for example, 41xx steels) contain 0.25% to 8% molybdenum. Even in these small portions, more than 43,000 tonnes of molybdenum are used each year in stainless steels, tool steels, cast irons, and high-temperature superalloys.

Molybdenum is also used in steel alloys for its high corrosion resistance and weldability. Molybdenum contributes corrosion resistance to type-300 stainless steels (specifically type-316) and especially so in the so-called superaustenitic stainless steels (such as alloy AL-6XN, 254SMO and 1925hMo). Molybdenum increases lattice strain, thus increasing the energy required to dissolve iron atoms from the surface. Molybdenum is also used to enhance the corrosion resistance of ferritic (for example grade 444) and martensitic (for example 1.4122 and 1.4418) stainless steels.

Because of its lower density and more stable price, molybdenum is sometimes used in place of tungsten. An example is the 'M' series of high-speed steels such as M2, M4 and M42 as substitution for the 'T' steel series, which contain tungsten. Molybdenum can also be used as a flame-resistant coating for other metals. Although its melting point is 2,623 °C (4,753 °F), molybdenum rapidly oxidizes at temperatures above 760 °C (1,400 °F) making it better-suited for use in vacuum environments.

TZM (Mo (~99%), Ti (~0.5%), Zr (~0.08%) and some C) is a corrosion-resisting molybdenum superalloy that resists molten fluoride salts at temperatures above 1,300 °C (2,370 °F). It has about twice the strength of pure Mo, and is more ductile and more weldable, yet in tests it resisted corrosion of a standard eutectic salt (FLiBe) and salt vapors used in molten salt reactors for 1100 hours with so little corrosion that it was difficult to measure. Due to its excellent mechanical properties under high temperature and high pressure, TZM alloys are extensively applied in the military industry. It is used as the valve body of torpedo engines, rocket nozzles and gas pipelines, where it can withstand extreme thermal and mechanical stresses. It is also used as radiation shields in nuclear applications.

Other molybdenum-based alloys that do not contain iron have only limited applications. For example, because of its resistance to molten zinc, both pure molybdenum and molybdenum-tungsten alloys (70%/30%) are used for piping, stirrers and pump impellers that come into contact with molten zinc.

=== Pure element applications ===
- Molybdenum powder is used as a fertilizer for some plants, such as cauliflower.
- Elemental molybdenum is used in NO, NO_{2}, NO_{x} analyzers in power plants for pollution controls. At 350 °C (662 °F), the element acts as a catalyst for NO_{2}/NO_{x} to form NO molecules for detection by infrared light.
- Molybdenum anodes replace tungsten in certain low voltage X-ray sources for specialized uses such as mammography.
- The radioactive isotope molybdenum-99 is used to generate technetium-99m, a short-lived daughter radionuclide (t_{½} ≃ 6.0 h) needed for medical imaging. The radioisotope is handled and stored as the molybdate (MoO^{2−}_{4}).

=== Compound applications ===
- Molybdenum disulfide (MoS_{2}) is used as a solid lubricant and a high-pressure high-temperature (HPHT) anti-wear agent. It forms strong films on metallic surfaces and is a common additive to HPHT greases — in the event of a catastrophic grease failure, a thin layer of molybdenum prevents contact of the lubricated parts.
- When combined with small amounts of cobalt, MoS_{2} is also used as a catalyst in the hydrodesulfurization (HDS) of petroleum. In the presence of hydrogen, this catalyst facilitates the removal of nitrogen and especially sulfur from the feedstock, which otherwise would poison downstream catalysts. HDS is one of the largest scale applications of catalysis in industry.
- Molybdenum oxides are important catalysts for selective oxidation of organic compounds. The production of the commodity chemicals acrylonitrile and formaldehyde relies on MoO_{x}-based catalysts.
- Molybdenum disilicide (MoSi_{2}) is an electrically conducting ceramic with primary use in heating elements operating at temperatures above 1500 °C in air.
- Molybdenum trioxide (MoO_{3}) is used as an adhesive between enamels and metals.
- Lead molybdate (wulfenite) co-precipitated with lead chromate and lead sulfate is a bright-orange pigment used with ceramics and plastics.
- The molybdenum-based mixed oxides are versatile catalysts in the chemical industry. Some examples are the catalysts for the oxidation of carbon monoxide, propylene to acrolein and acrylic acid, the ammoxidation of propylene to acrylonitrile.
- Molybdenum carbides, nitride and phosphides can be used for hydrotreatment of rapeseed oil.
- Ammonium heptamolybdate is used in biological staining.
- Molybdenum coated soda lime glass is used in CIGS (copper indium gallium selenide) solar cells, called CIGS solar cells.
- Phosphomolybdic acid is a stain used in thin-layer chromatography and trichrome staining in histochemistry.
- Molybdenum is added to stainless steel (e.g., AISI 316L hMo) to improve its corrosion resistance, especially in the presence of harmful reduced sulfur species such as sulfide (H_{2}S, HS^{−}, S^{2−}, sulfide stress cracking) and thiosulfate (S_{2}O^{2−}_{3}, pitting corrosion).

== Biological role ==
Molybdenum, despite its low concentration in the environment, is a critically important element for Earth's biosphere due to its presence in the most common nitrogenases. Without molybdenum, nitrogen fixation would be greatly reduced, and a large part of biosynthesis as we know it would not occur. Molybdenum is also essential to many individual organisms as a component of enzymes, particularly as part of the molybdopterin class of cofactors.

=== Mo-containing enzymes ===
Molybdopterin complexed with a molybdenum(VI) atom.

Structure of the FeMoco active site of nitrogenase

Molybdenum is an essential element in most organisms; a 2008 research paper speculated that a scarcity of molybdenum in the Earth's early oceans may have strongly influenced the evolution of eukaryotic life (which includes all plants and animals).

At least 50 molybdenum-containing enzymes have been identified, mostly in bacteria. Those enzymes include aldehyde oxidase, sulfite oxidase and xanthine oxidase. With one exception, Mo in proteins is bound by molybdopterin to give the molybdenum cofactor. The only known exception is nitrogenase, which uses the FeMoco cofactor, which has the formula Fe_{7}MoS_{9}C.

In terms of function, molybdoenzymes catalyze the oxidation and sometimes reduction of certain small molecules in the process of regulating nitrogen, sulfur, and carbon. In some animals, and in humans, the oxidation of xanthine to uric acid, a process of purine catabolism, is catalyzed by xanthine oxidase, a molybdenum-containing enzyme. The activity of xanthine oxidase is directly proportional to the amount of molybdenum in the body. An extremely high concentration of molybdenum reverses the trend and can inhibit purine catabolism and other processes. Molybdenum concentration also affects protein synthesis, metabolism, and growth.

Mo is a component in most nitrogenases. Among molybdoenzymes, nitrogenases are unique in lacking the molybdopterin. Nitrogenases catalyze the production of ammonia from atmospheric nitrogen:

$$\mathrm{N_2 + 8 \ H^+ + 8 \ e^- + 16 \ ATP + 16 \ H_2O \longrightarrow 2 \ NH_3 + H_2 + 16 \ ADP + 16 \ P_i}$$

The biosynthesis of the FeMoco active site is highly complex.

Molybdate is transported in the body as MoO_{4}^{2−}.

=== Human metabolism and deficiency ===
Molybdenum is an essential trace dietary element. Four mammalian Mo-dependent enzymes are known, all of them harboring a pterin-based molybdenum cofactor (Moco) in their active site: sulfite oxidase, xanthine oxidoreductase, aldehyde oxidase, and mitochondrial amidoxime reductase. People severely deficient in molybdenum have poorly functioning sulfite oxidase and are prone to toxic reactions to sulfites in foods. The human body contains about 0.07 mg of molybdenum per kilogram of body weight, with higher concentrations in the liver and kidneys and lower in the vertebrae. Molybdenum is also present within human tooth enamel and may help prevent its decay.

Acute toxicity has not been seen in humans, and the toxicity depends strongly on the chemical state. Studies on rats show a median lethal dose (LD_{50}) as low as 180 mg/kg for some Mo compounds. Although human toxicity data is unavailable, animal studies have shown that chronic ingestion of more than 10 mg/day of molybdenum can cause diarrhea, growth retardation, infertility, low birth weight, and gout; it can also affect the lungs, kidneys, and liver. Sodium tungstate is a competitive inhibitor of molybdenum. Dietary tungsten reduces the concentration of molybdenum in tissues.

Low soil concentration of molybdenum in a geographical band from northern China to Iran results in a general dietary molybdenum deficiency and is associated with increased rates of esophageal cancer. Compared to the United States, which has a greater supply of molybdenum in the soil, people living in those areas have about 16 times greater risk for esophageal squamous cell carcinoma.

Molybdenum deficiency has also been reported as a consequence of non-molybdenum supplemented total parenteral nutrition (complete intravenous feeding) for long periods of time. It results in high blood levels of sulfite and urate, in much the same way as molybdenum cofactor deficiency. Since pure molybdenum deficiency from this cause occurs primarily in adults, the neurological consequences are not as marked as in cases of congenital cofactor deficiency.

A congenital molybdenum cofactor deficiency disease, seen in infants, is an inability to synthesize molybdenum cofactor, the heterocyclic molecule discussed above that binds molybdenum at the active site in all known human enzymes that use molybdenum. The resulting deficiency results in high levels of sulfite and urate, and neurological damage.

=== Excretion ===
Most molybdenum is excreted from the human body as molybdate in the urine. Furthermore, urinary excretion of molybdenum increases as dietary molybdenum intake increases. Small amounts of molybdenum are excreted from the body in the feces by way of the bile; small amounts also can be lost in sweat and in hair.

=== Excess and copper antagonism ===
High levels of molybdenum can interfere with the body's uptake of copper, producing copper deficiency. Molybdenum prevents plasma proteins from binding to copper, and it also increases the amount of copper that is excreted in urine. Ruminants that consume high levels of molybdenum suffer from diarrhea, stunted growth, anemia, and achromotrichia (loss of fur pigment). These symptoms can be alleviated by copper supplements, either dietary and injection. The effective copper deficiency can be aggravated by excess sulfur.

Copper reduction or deficiency can also be deliberately induced for therapeutic purposes by the compound ammonium tetrathiomolybdate, in which the bright red anion tetrathiomolybdate is the copper-chelating agent. Tetrathiomolybdate was first used therapeutically in the treatment of copper toxicosis in animals. It was then introduced as a treatment in Wilson's disease, a hereditary copper metabolism disorder in humans; it acts both by competing with copper absorption in the bowel and by increasing excretion. It has also been found to have an inhibitory effect on angiogenesis, potentially by inhibiting the membrane translocation process that is dependent on copper ions. This is a promising avenue for investigation of treatments for cancer, age-related macular degeneration, and other diseases that involve a pathologic proliferation of blood vessels.

In some grazing livestock, most strongly in cattle, molybdenum excess in the soil of pasturage can produce scours (diarrhea) if the pH of the soil is neutral to alkaline; see teartness.

=== Mammography ===
Molybdenum targets are used in mammography because they produce X-rays in the energy range of 17–20 keV, which is optimal for imaging soft tissues like the breast. The characteristic X-rays emitted from molybdenum provide high contrast between different types of tissues, allowing for the effective visualization of microcalcifications and other subtle abnormalities in breast tissue. This energy range also minimizes radiation dose while maximizing image quality, making molybdenum targets particularly suitable for breast cancer screening.

== Dietary recommendations ==
In 2000, the then U.S. Institute of Medicine (now the National Academy of Medicine, NAM) updated its Estimated Average Requirements (EARs) and Recommended Dietary Allowances (RDAs) for molybdenum. If there is not sufficient information to establish EARs and RDAs, an estimate designated Adequate Intake (AI) is used instead.

An AI of 2 micrograms (μg) of molybdenum per day was established for infants up to 6 months of age, and 3 μg/day from 7 to 12 months of age, both for males and females. For older children and adults, the following daily RDAs have been established for molybdenum: 17 μg from 1 to 3 years of age, 22 μg from 4 to 8 years, 34 μg from 9 to 13 years, 43 μg from 14 to 18 years, and 45 μg for persons 19 years old and older. All these RDAs are valid for both sexes. Pregnant or lactating females from 14 to 50 years of age have a higher daily RDA of 50 μg of molybdenum.

As for safety, the NAM sets tolerable upper intake levels (ULs) for vitamins and minerals when evidence is sufficient. In the case of molybdenum, the UL is 2000 μg/day. Collectively the EARs, RDAs, AIs and ULs are referred to as Dietary Reference Intakes (DRIs).

The European Food Safety Authority (EFSA) refers to the collective set of information as Dietary Reference Values, with Population Reference Intake (PRI) instead of RDA, and Average Requirement instead of EAR. AI and UL are defined the same as in the United States. For women and men ages 15 and older, the AI is set at 65 μg/day. Pregnant and lactating women have the same AI. For children aged 1–14 years, the AIs increase with age from 15 to 45 μg/day. The adult AIs are higher than the U.S. RDAs, but on the other hand, the European Food Safety Authority reviewed the same safety question and set its UL at 600 μg/day, which is much lower than the U.S. value.

=== Labeling ===
For U.S. food and dietary supplement labeling purposes, the amount in a serving is expressed as a percent of Daily Value (%DV). For molybdenum labeling purposes, 100% of the Daily Value was 75 μg, but as of May 27, 2016 it was revised to 45 μg. A table of the old and new adult daily values is provided at Reference Daily Intake.

== Food sources ==
Average daily intake varies between 120 and 240 μg/day, which is higher than dietary recommendations. Pork, lamb, and beef liver each have approximately 1.5 parts per million of molybdenum. Other significant dietary sources include green beans, eggs, sunflower seeds, wheat flour, lentils, cucumbers, and cereal grain.

== Precautions ==
Molybdenum dusts and fumes, generated by mining or metalworking, can be toxic, especially if ingested (including dust trapped in the sinuses and later swallowed). Low levels of prolonged exposure can cause irritation to the eyes and skin. Direct inhalation or ingestion of molybdenum and its oxides should be avoided. OSHA regulations specify the maximum permissible molybdenum exposure in an 8-hour day as 5 mg/m^{3}. Chronic exposure to 60 to 600 mg/m^{3} can cause symptoms including fatigue, headaches and joint pains. At levels of 5000 mg/m^{3}, molybdenum is immediately dangerous to life and health.

== See also ==
- List of molybdenum mines
- Molybdenum mining in the United States

== Bibliography ==
- Lettera di Giulio Candida al signor Vincenzo Petagna – Sulla formazione del molibdeno. Naples: Giuseppe Maria Porcelli. 1785.
