= Ultratrace element =

Rare chemical element in organism

In biochemistry, an ultratrace element is a chemical element that normally comprises less than one microgram per gram of a given organism (i.e. less than 0.0001% by weight), but which plays a significant role in its metabolism.

Possible ultratrace elements in humans include boron, silicon, nickel, vanadium and cobalt. Other possible ultratrace elements in other organisms include bromine, cadmium, fluorine, lead, lithium, and tin.

== See also ==
- Trace element
