= Molybdenum deficiency =

- Molybdenum
- Specialty: Endocrinology

Molybdenum deficiency refers to the clinical consequences of inadequate intake of molybdenum in the diet.

Because the amount of molybdenum required is very small, and the element is plentiful, molybdenum deficiency has never been observed in healthy people. However, it has been seen once, in 1981, in an exceptional case of a patient receiving long-term parenteral nutrition that lacked molybdenum. This should not be confused with the molybdenum cofactor deficiency, which is a genetic inability to metabolize molybdenum and is universally fatal within the first days of the infant's life.

== Signs and symptoms ==
Descriptions of human molybdenum deficiency are few. A patient receiving prolonged parenteral nutrition acquired a syndrome described as ‘acquired molybdenum deficiency.’ This syndrome, exacerbated by methionine administration, was characterized by high blood methionine, low blood uric acid, and low urinary uric acid and sulfate concentrations. The patient suffered mental disturbances that progressed to a coma. Pathological changes occurring in individuals with a genetic disease that results in a sulfite oxidase (a molybdoenzyme) deficiency include increased plasma and urine sulfite, sulfate, thiosulfate, S-sulfocysteine and taurine; seizures and brain atrophy/lesions; dislocated lenses; and death at an early age.

A molydenum deficiency can cause in some humans neural degradation resulting in some symptoms similar to ALS.

== Treatment ==
300 mcg ammonium molybdate per day can bring about recovery of acquired molybdenum deficiency.

== See also ==
- Molybdenum cofactor deficiency
