= Cyclic pyranopterin monophosphate synthase =

Enzyme

Identifiers
- EC no.: 4.1.99.18

Databases
- IntEnz: IntEnz view
- BRENDA: BRENDA entry
- ExPASy: NiceZyme view
- KEGG: KEGG entry
- MetaCyc: metabolic pathway
- PRIAM: profile
- PDB structures: RCSB PDB PDBe PDBsum
Search
- PMC: articles
- PubMed: articles
- NCBI: proteins

Cyclic pyranopterin monophosphate synthase (EC 4.1.99.18, MOCS1A, MoaA, MoaC, molybdenum cofactor biosynthesis protein 1) is an enzyme with systematic name GTP 8,9-lyase (cyclic pyranopterin monophosphate-forming). This enzyme catalyses the following chemical reaction

GTP $\rightleftharpoons$ cyclic pyranopterin monophosphate + diphosphate

This enzyme catalyses an early step in the biosynthesis of molybdopterin.
