= Blend time =

Time to achieve a predefined level of homogeneity of a flow tracer in a mixing vessel

Blend time, sometimes termed mixing time, is the time to achieve a predefined level of homogeneity of a tracer in a mixing vessel. Blend time is an important parameter to evaluate the mixing efficiency of mixing devices. In order to make this definition valid, the tracer should be in the same physical phase (e.g. liquid) as the bulk material.

Blend time can be determined either with experiments or numerical modeling, such as computational fluid dynamics (CFD). The experimental methods to determine the blend time in liquid include conductivity method and discoloration method. The conductivity method requires a conductivity probe to present in the target system, which make it an intrusive method because the existence of the probe might change the mixing efficiency of the mixing device. Discoloration method does not require any probe which makes it a non-intrusive method. However, the color detection device (sometimes the human eye) needs to be calibrated against the conductivity method. Both methods are usually applied to monitor the concentration of the tracer in the most difficult to mix locations such as the area adjacent to the impeller shaft.

The benefit of numerical modeling is that once the modeling is completed, the blend time of any predetermined level of homogeneity of any location within the mixing system can be predicted, which is impossible to accomplish by experimental methods. However, numerical modeling needs to be validated by experimental methods.
