= Molybdenum cofactor deficiency =

- Other names: Sulfite oxidase deficiency due to molybdenum cofactor deficiency
- Specialty: Medical genetics

Molybdenum cofactor deficiency is a rare human disease in which the absence of molybdopterin – and consequently its molybdenum complex, commonly called molybdenum cofactor – leads to accumulation of toxic levels of sulphite and neurological damage. Usually this leads to death within months of birth, due to the lack of active sulfite oxidase. Furthermore, a mutational block in molybdenum cofactor biosynthesis causes absence of enzyme activity of xanthine dehydrogenase/oxidase and aldehyde oxidase.

== Cause ==
When caused by a mutation in the MOCS1 gene it is the type A variant. It can also be caused by a mutation in the MOCS2 gene or the GPHN gene. As of 2010, there had been approximately 132 reported cases.

It should not be confused with molybdenum deficiency.

== Diagnosis ==
Diagnosis of molybdenum cofactor deficiency includes early seizures, low blood levels of uric acid, and high levels of sulphite, xanthine, and uric acid in urine. Additionally, the disease produces characteristic MRI images that can aid in diagnosis.

Infants with molybdenum cofactor deficiency may also experience increased or decreased muscle tone, difficulty feeding, abnormally high fussiness, exaggerated startle, microcephaly, coarse facial features, and eye lens dislocation.

== Treatment ==
On 26 February 2021, the U.S. Food and Drug Administration approved fosdenopterin (Nulibry) for intravenous injection to reduce the risk of death due to Molybdenum Cofactor Deficiency Type A. Fosdenopterin replaces the missing cyclic pyranopterin monophosphate (cPMP).

== Prevalence ==
The prevalence of molybdenum co-factor deficiency is estimated as being between 1 in 100 000 and 1 in 200 000. To date more than 100 cases have been reported. However, this may significantly under represent cases.

== Research ==
In 2009, Monash Children's Hospital at Southern Health in Melbourne, Australia reported that a patient known as Baby Z became the first person to be successfully treated for molybdenum cofactor deficiency type A. The patient was treated with cPMP, a precursor of molybdopterin. Baby Z will require daily injections of cyclic pyranopterin monophosphate (cPMP) for the rest of her life.

== See also ==
- Sulfite oxidase
