= Mitochondrial amidoxime reducing component 1 =

Mammalian protein found in humans

MTARC1

Identifiers
- Aliases: MTARC1, MOSC1, mitochondrial amidoxime reducing component 1, MARC1
- External IDs: OMIM: 614126; MGI: 1913362; GeneCards: MTARC1

Gene location (Human)
Chr.	Chromosome 1 (human)
Band	1q41	Start	220,786,352 bp
Band	1q41	End	220,819,659 bp

Gene location (Mouse)
Chr.	Chromosome 1 (mouse)
Band	1|1 H5	Start	184,518,964 bp
Band	1|1 H5	End	184,543,510 bp
RNA expression pattern
Bgee	Human / Mouse (ortholog); Top expressed in: adipose tissue; abdominal fat; right lobe of liver; right lobe of thyroid gland; subcutaneous adipose tissue; left lobe of thyroid gland; monocyte; mucosa of transverse colon; parotid gland; ventricular zone / Top expressed in: left lobe of liver; yolk sac; white adipose tissue; sexually immature organism; mammary gland; lumbar subsegment of spinal cord; lumbar spinal ganglion; brown adipose tissue; subcutaneous adipose tissue; tunica adventitia of aorta; More reference expression data
BioGPS	n/a
Gene ontology
Molecular function	molybdopterin cofactor binding; molybdenum ion binding; oxidoreductase activity; pyridoxal phosphate binding; nitrate reductase activity; catalytic activity
Cellular component	integral component of membrane; membrane; mitochondrion; mitochondrial outer membrane
Biological process	detoxification of nitrogen compound; nitrate metabolic process; xenobiotic metabolic process; metabolism
Sources:Amigo / QuickGO
Orthologs
Databases	NCBI: entry; OMA: entry
Species	Human	Mouse
Entrez	64757	66112
Ensembl	ENSG00000186205	ENSMUSG00000026621
UniProt	Q5VT66	Q9CW42
RefSeq (mRNA)	NM_022746	NM_001081361; NM_001290273
RefSeq (protein)	NP_073583	NP_001277202
Location (UCSC)	Chr 1: 220.79 – 220.82 Mb	Chr 1: 184.52 – 184.54 Mb
PubMed search
- Wikidata
View/Edit Human	View/Edit Mouse

Mitochondrial amidoxime-reducing component 1 (also known as MOCO sulphurase C-terminal domain containing 1, MOSC1 or MARC1) is a mammalian molybdenum-containing enzyme. It is located in the outer mitochondrial membrane and consists of a N-terminal mitochondrial signal domain facing the inter-membrane space, a transmembrane domain, and a C-terminal catalytic domain facing the cytosol. In humans it is encoded by the MOSC1 gene.

MOCO stands for molybdenum cofactor.

MOSC1 has been reported to reduce amidoximes to amidines.

Genetic variation in MARC1 has been reported to be associated with lower blood cholesterol levels, blood liver enzyme levels, reduced liver fat and protection from cirrhosis suggesting that MARC1 deficiency may protect against liver disease. A genome-wide association study involving subjects from the UK Biobank further established an association of alcoholic-related liver disease.

== See also ==
- MOCOS
