= Sakana =

Japanese snacks, eaten with alcohol

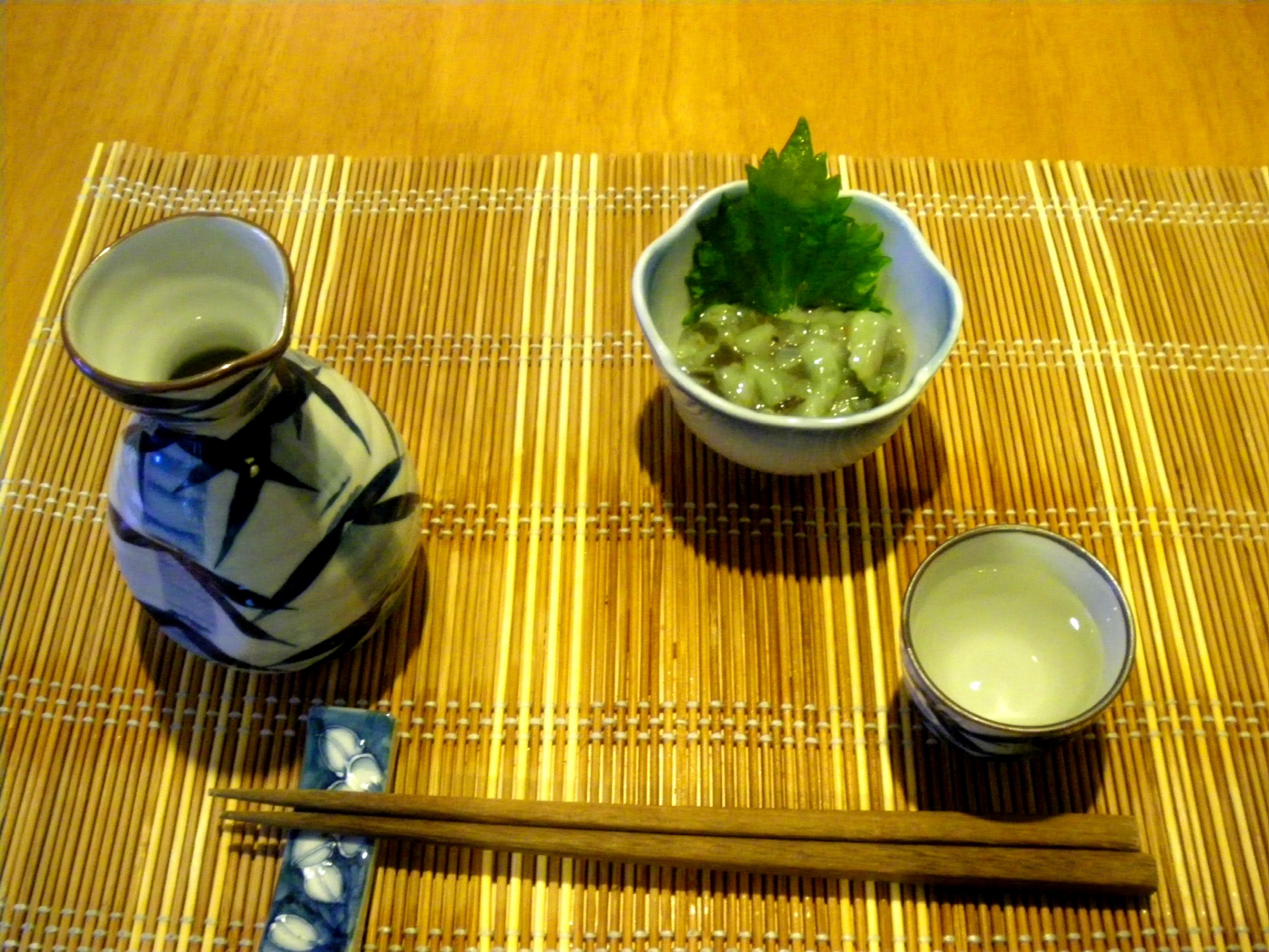
Sake and sakana

In Japan, it is customary to serve alcoholic drinks with snacks called sakana (肴), shukō (酒肴), or otsumami (お摘み). These are usually quite salty and served in relatively small portions. Sakana are usually more substantial than tapas, although they are not considered a meal since they are not accompanied by rice. Traditionally, the Japanese regarded sake, which is made from rice, as a substitute for white rice served in a standard Japanese meal, and as a result some Japanese do not eat rice and drink alcohol simultaneously.

Sakana are served in drinking establishments known as izakaya. When first seated in an izakaya, an otōshi (お通し) or appetizer is placed on the table before any drinks are ordered. The otōshi is charged to the customer as a type of cover charge. Common otoshi include cabbage salad (often refilled free of charge), Japanese-style potato salad, tsukemono, and shiokara. Sakana are ordered throughout the time one is drinking and come to the table a few at a time. It is common to order a different kind of sakana as a shime, last dish. Shime are often softer dishes like noodles or sweeter dishes like tamagoyaki.

It is common for sakana to also be served at home or in private when alcohol is consumed. There are a variety of cookbooks that give examples of sakana that are easy to prepare at home. Combini and other stores that sell alcohol often have a selection of pre-packaged dried snacks, canned items, and pickles designed to be consumed as sakana.

Sakana were originally designed to be paired with shochu or sake. Since the 19th century, the market share for Japanese beer has expanded in Japan. In 1959 beer overtook sake as the nation's most popular alcoholic beverage in taxable shipping volume, and at the same time various foods designed to accompany beer have become popular. There are also sakana designed to be paired with wine.

Sakana have embraced not only washoku, Japanese cuisine, but also yōshoku, Western-influenced dishes. It is not uncommon to encounter Naporitan or Italian-style pasta, pizza, cheese, and gyoza in modern izakaya. Some of the most common sakana are actually yōshoku, including potato salad, korokke and other deep-fried foods.

== Etymology ==
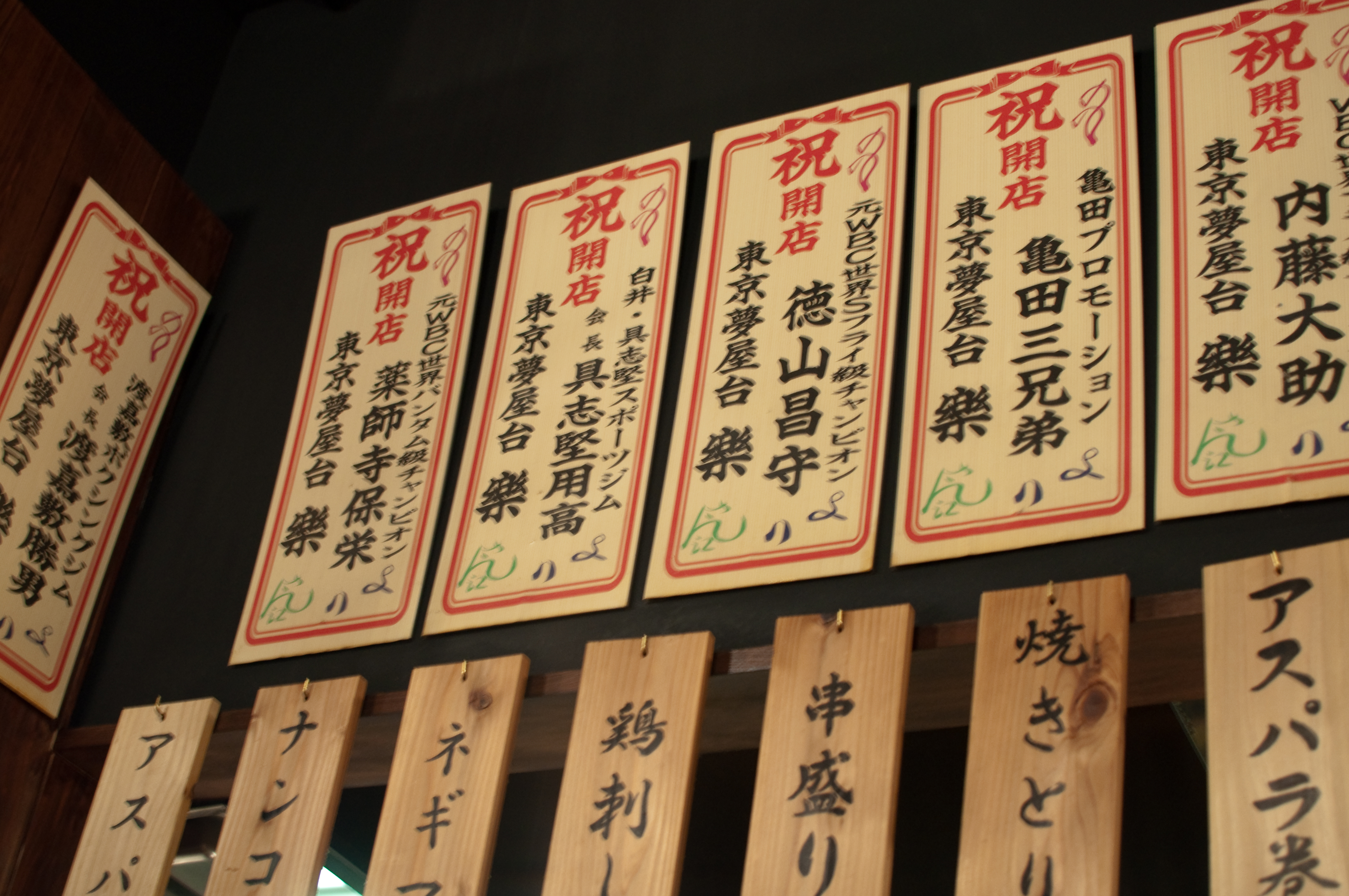
Example of traditional izakaya menu with sakana listed on tags on the wall

The term sakana traditionally refers to food served with sake, and originates from the words sake (酒) and na (菜; lit. 'side dish'). Because dried fish and salted fish roe were popular choice for such dishes, over the years the primary meaning of sakana became fish of any kind. The two meanings are distinguished in writing as fish (魚) and snack (肴).

Another word for "snack" in Japanese is otsumami (お摘み). The Japanese noun tsumami means "something to nibble/eat with a drink", which is beautified by adding an honorific prefix o and becoming otsumami; this term usually applies to smaller dishes. Otsumami are generally simpler dishes suited for otōshi (お通し) or preparing and eating at home. Since otoshi are placed on the table as customers sit down, they are usually dishes that can be prepared ahead of time in large portions and served cold or at room temperature. This makes them attractive to housewives who wish to prepare a variety of sakana ahead of time.

Ate (あて) or ategau (あてがう), meaning 'accompaniment', is also sometimes used to refer to foods that go well with alcohol.

== Types of sakana ==
When drinking at home, sakana can be more modest. A bachelor or someone living alone might open a can of mackerel (sanma or saury) in miso or soy sauce, or simply use a pre-packaged form of sakana like pickles or Japanese potato salad bought at a supermarket or convenience store. Certain sakana like kaki no tane are associated with bachelors or older men.

Some common sakana are:

- Yakitori - grilled skewers of chicken and chicken parts
- Kushiage - deep-fried skewers of meat or vegetables
- Sashimi - slices of raw fish
- Tsukemono - pickles

- Sakana especially popular with beer:
  - Edamame - salted and boiled soybean pods
  - Nankotsu (chicken cartilage) karaage
  - Sausages
- Sakana especially popular with sake:
  - Shiokara - fermented, salted squid innards
  - Roe
    - Uni - Sea urchin roe
    - Ikura - Red caviar (ikra)
    - Mentaiko - spicy pollock roe
    - Tarako - pollock roe
    - Sujiko - salted salmon roe
- Small snacks:
  - Atarime/ika ichiya-boshi - Dried squid
  - Ei-hire - dried skate
  - Seaweed
  - Cheese
  - Peanuts or other types of nuts (such as almonds or mixed nuts)
  - Potato chips or fried potato sticks
  - Arare - crackers made primarily from rice flour with other ingredients
  - Tatami iwashi - small dried sardines pressed into a cracker-like square form
  - Ume suishō - Ume suishō is a Japanese delicacy made by finely chopping shark cartilage and mixing it with pickled plum paste.

== Examples ==
Fish and seafood

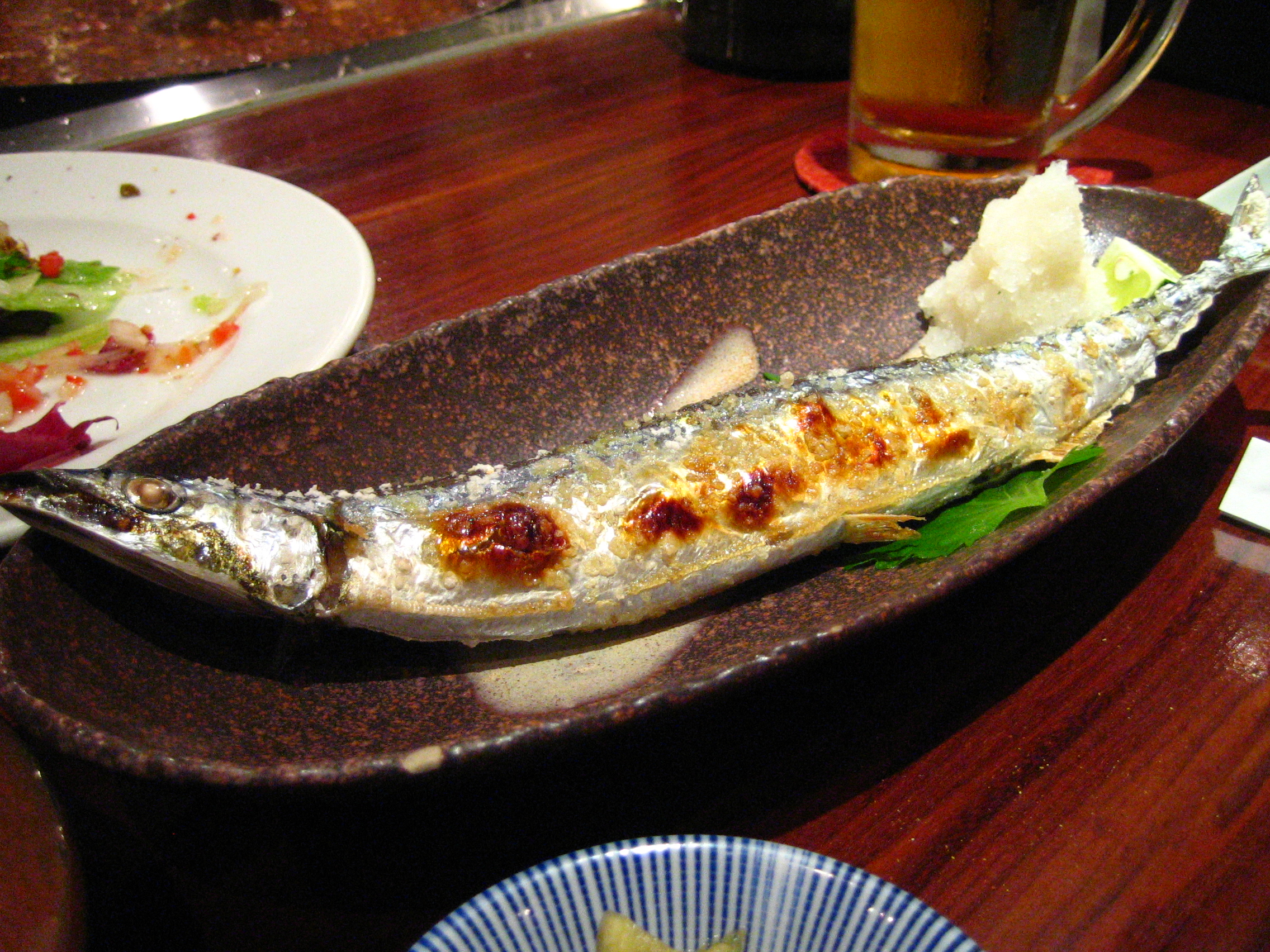
Sanma grilled with salt

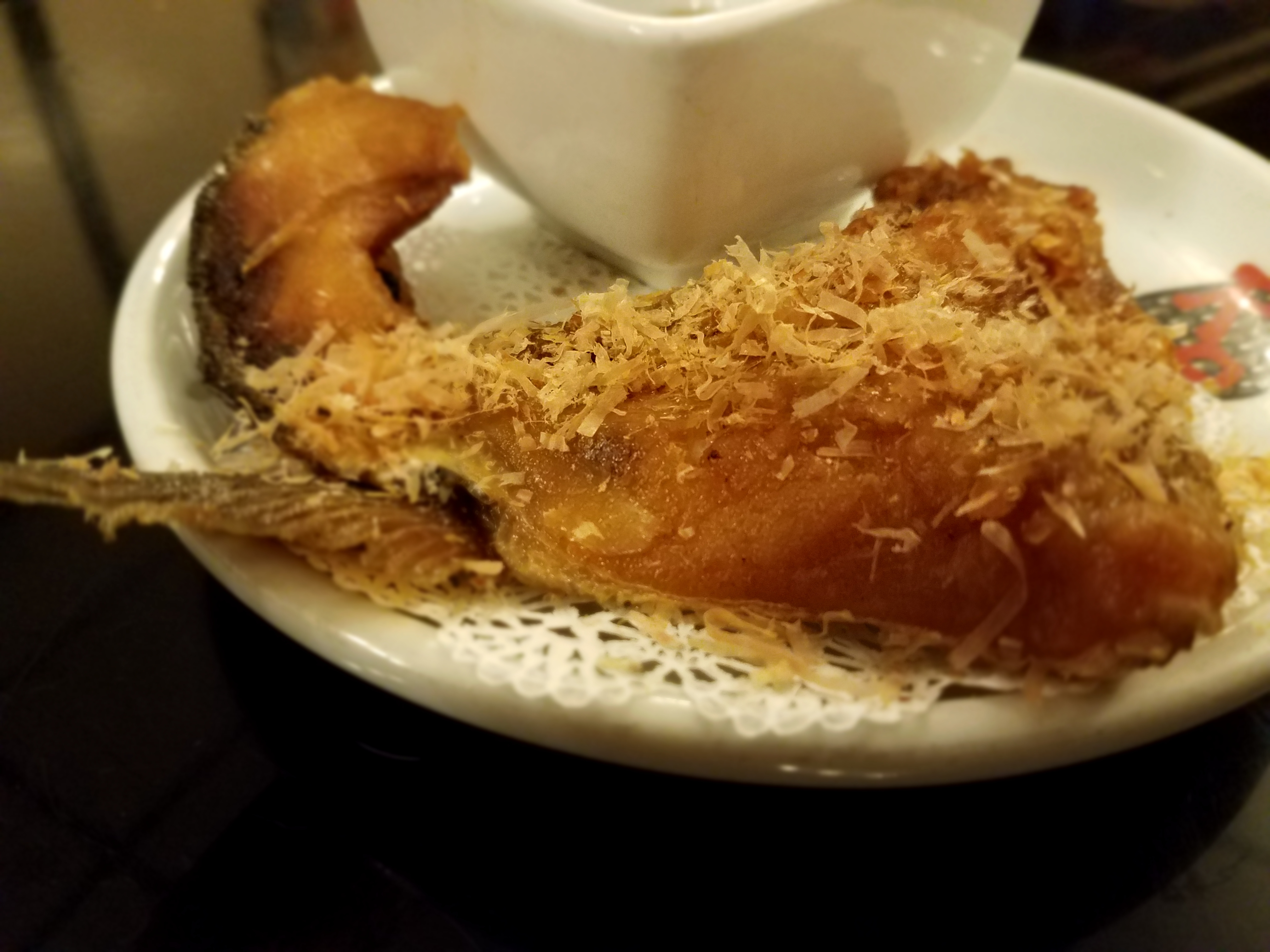
Hamachi kama, yellowtail collar

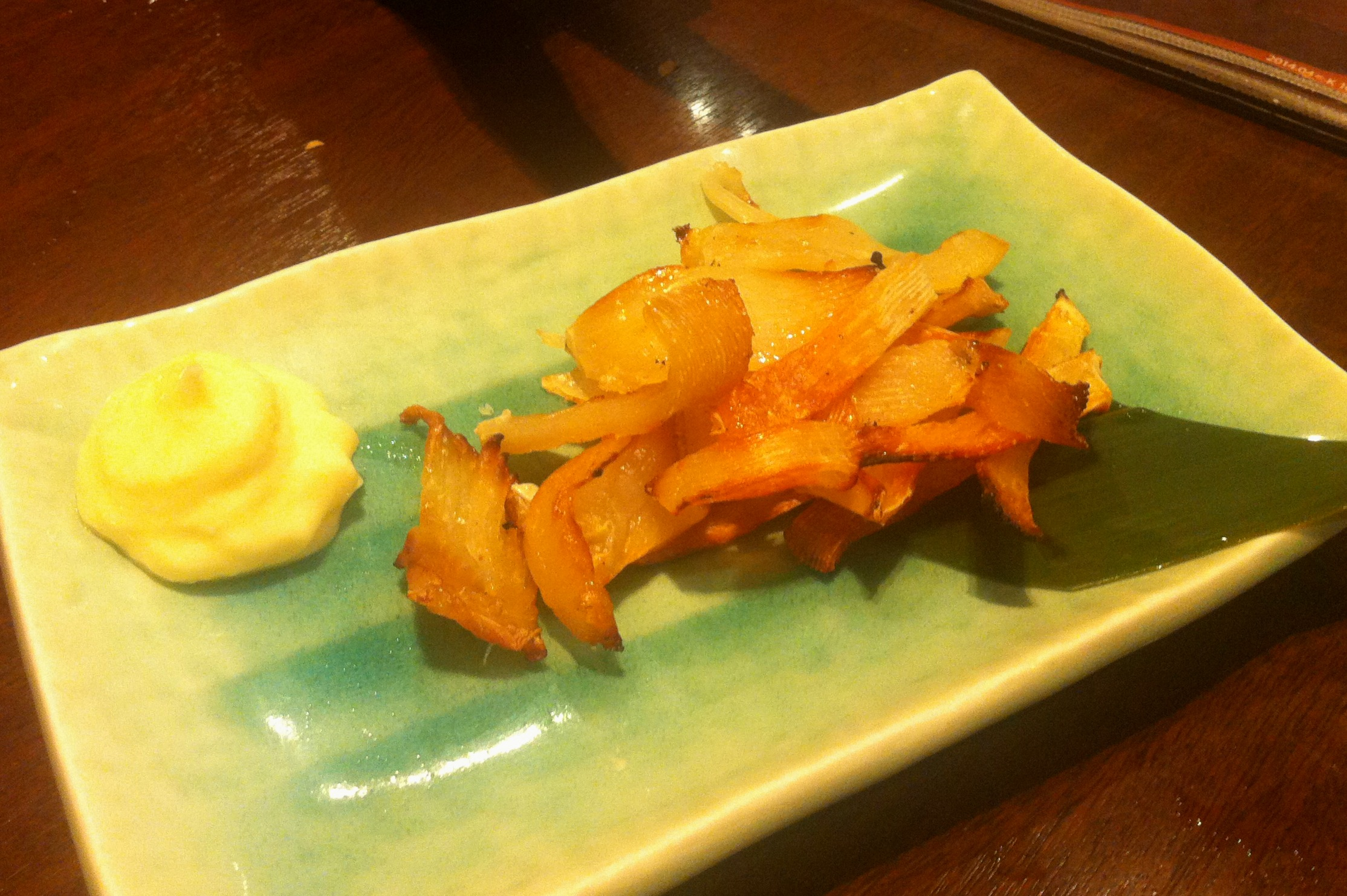
Eihire, grilled stingray fin

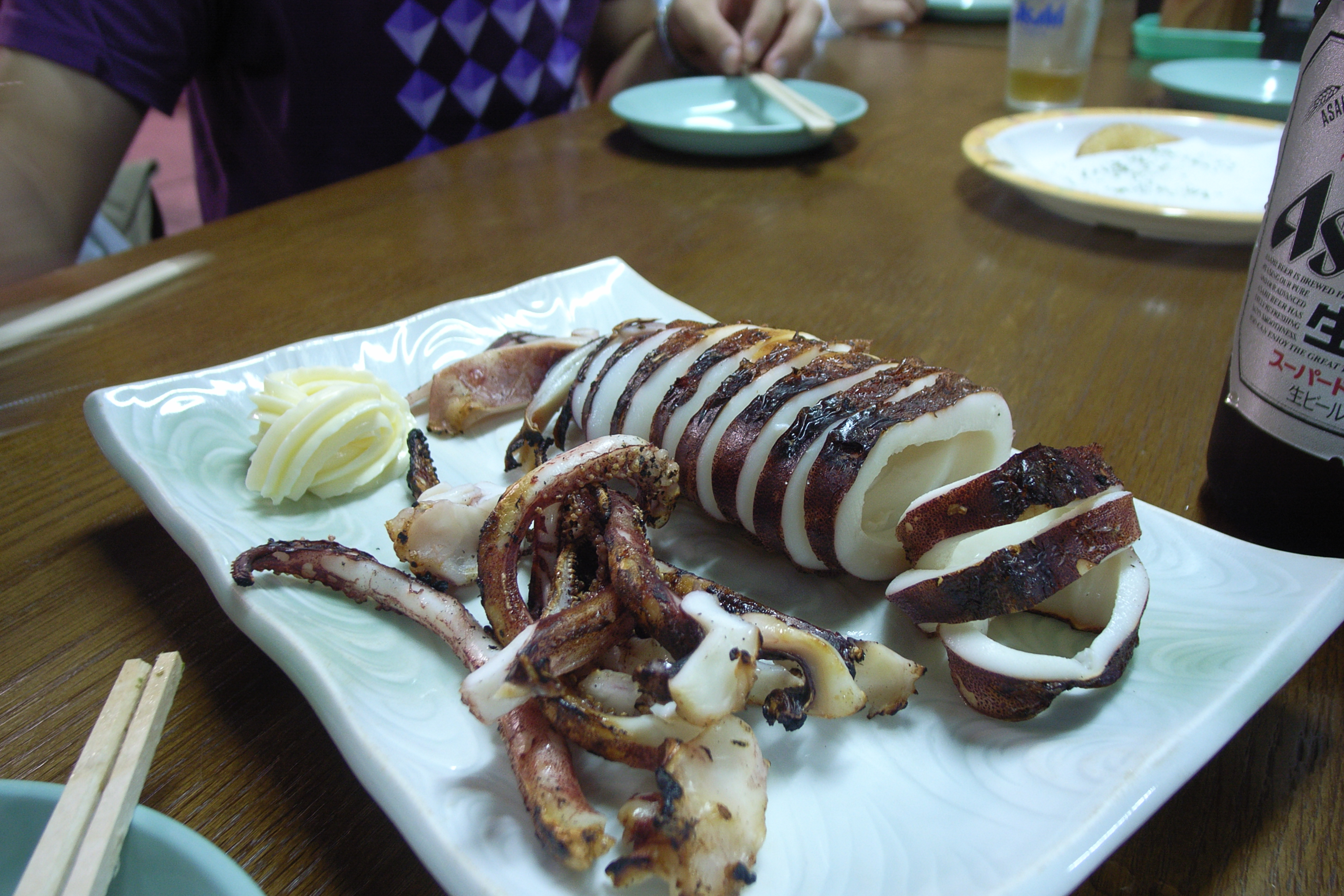
Ikayaki, grilled squid

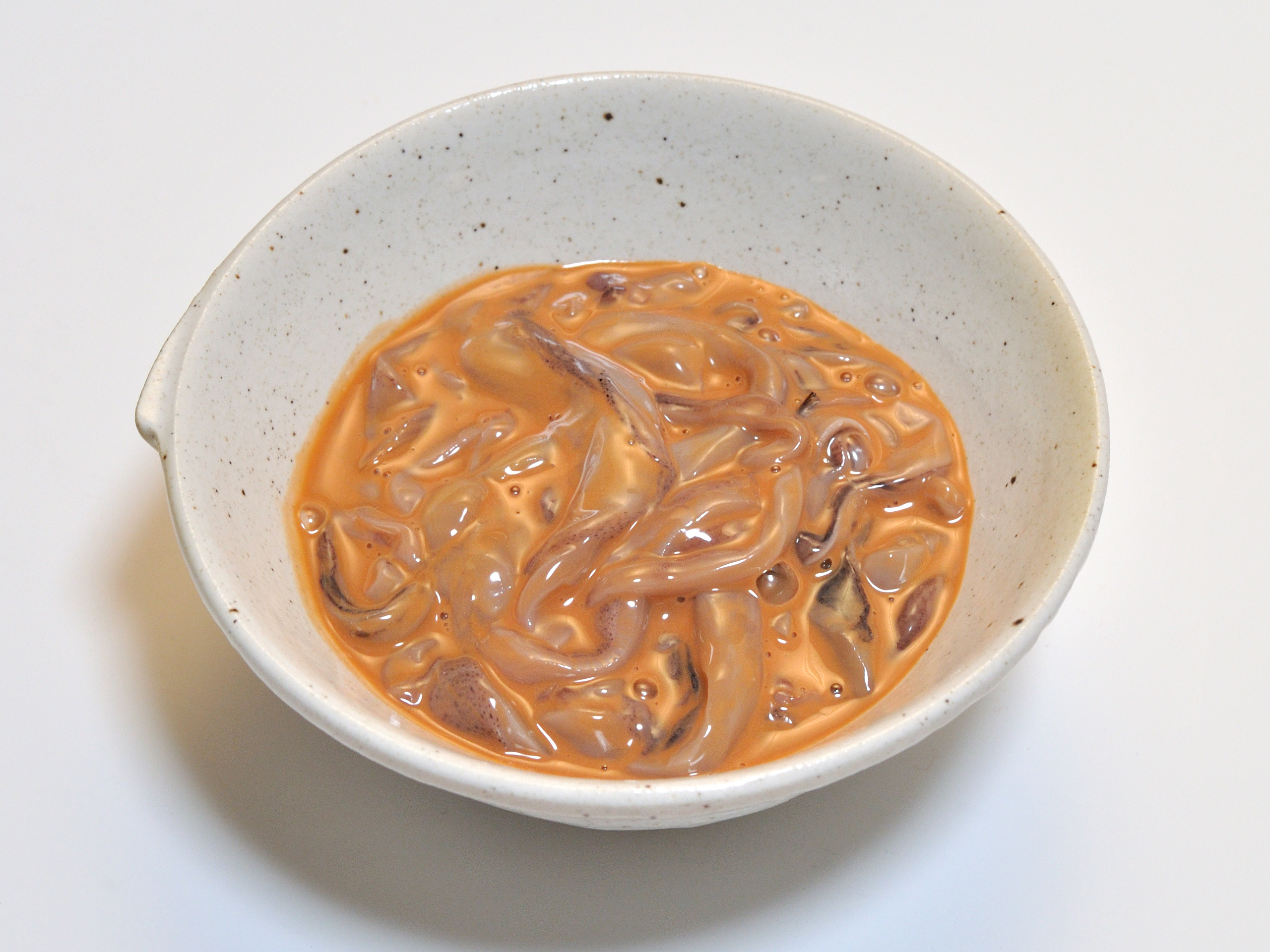
Shiokara, fermented squid innards

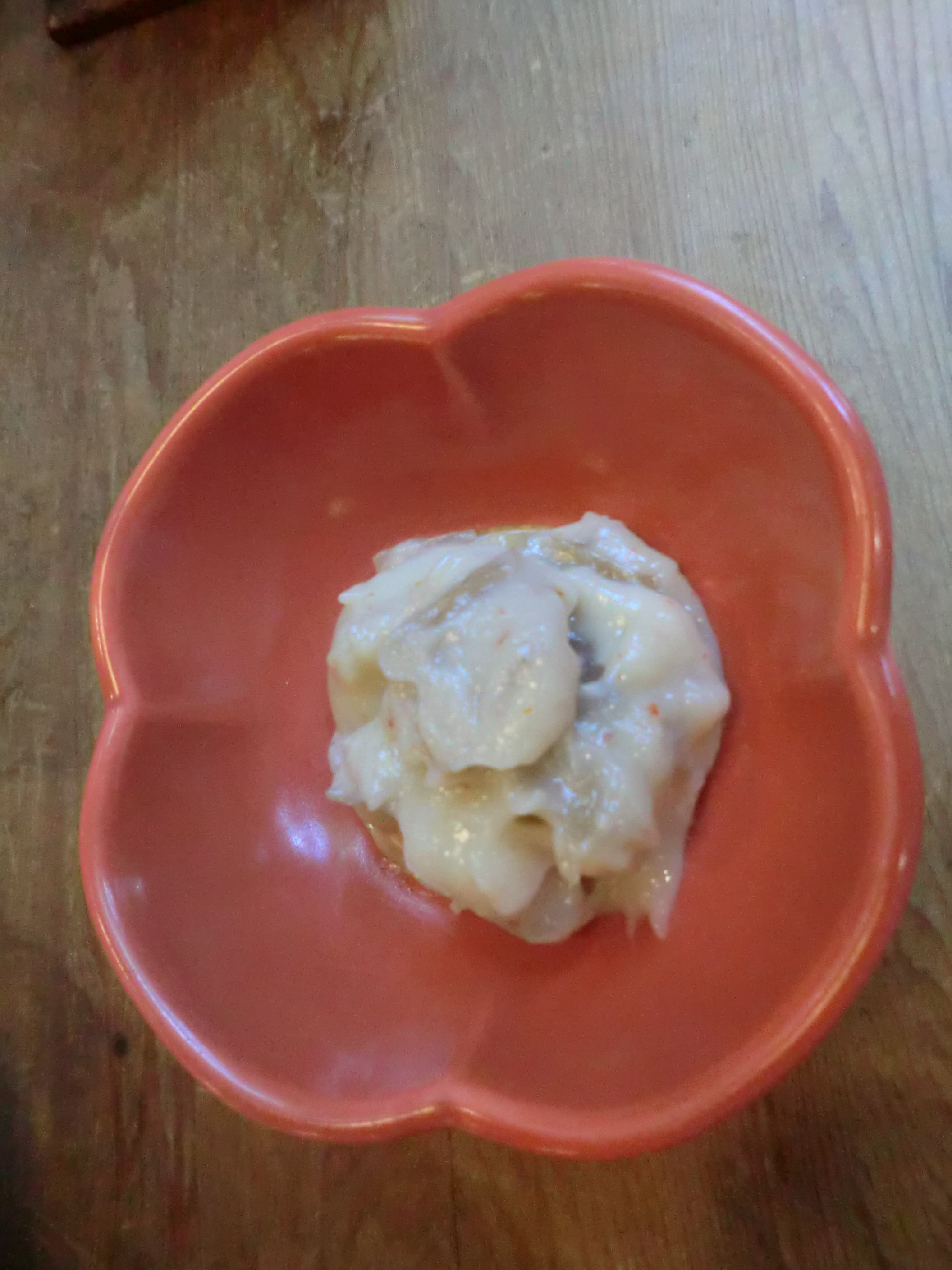
Umitake kasuzuke, clam pickled in sake lees

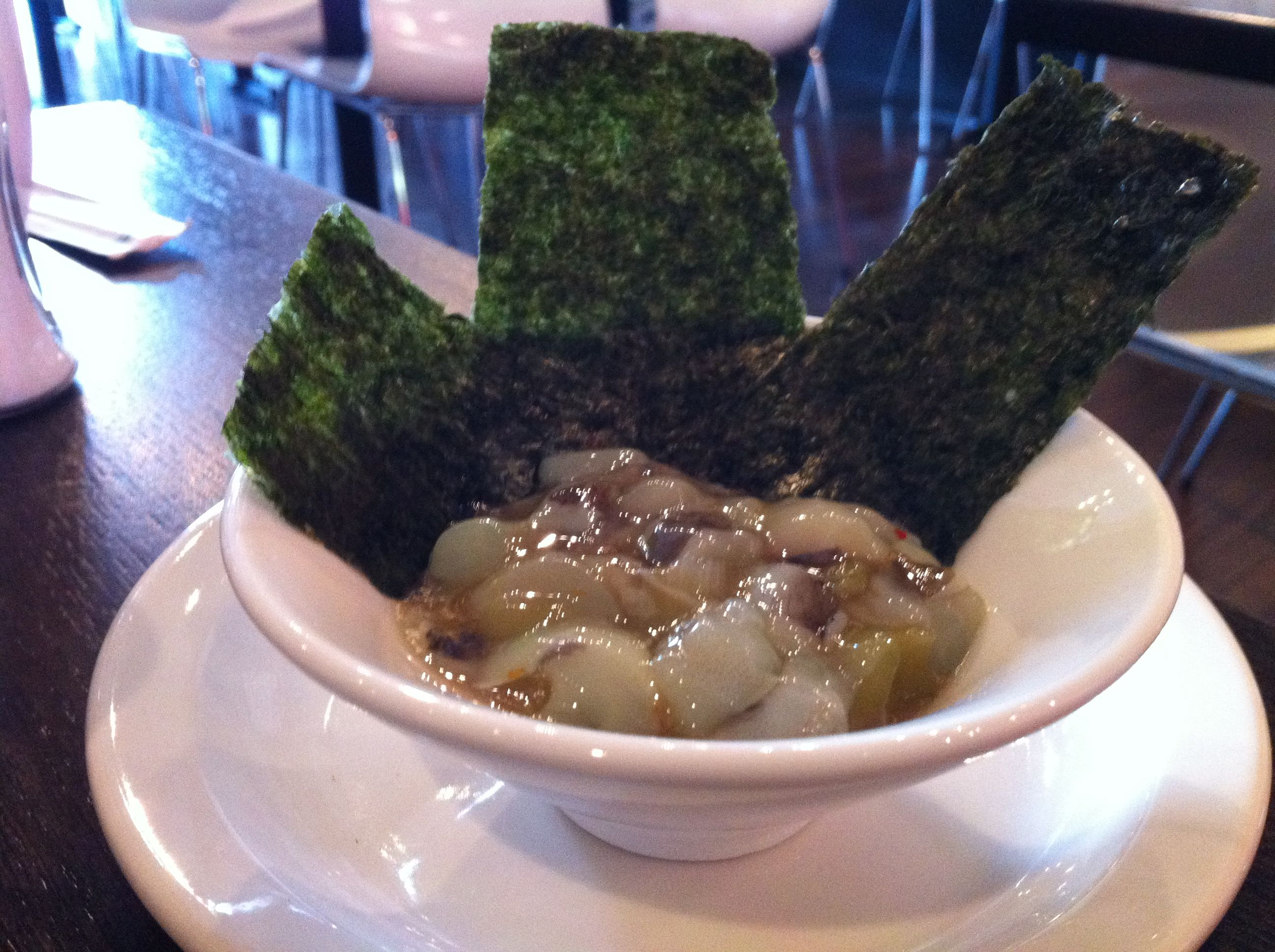
Takowasa, chopped octopus pickled in wasabi

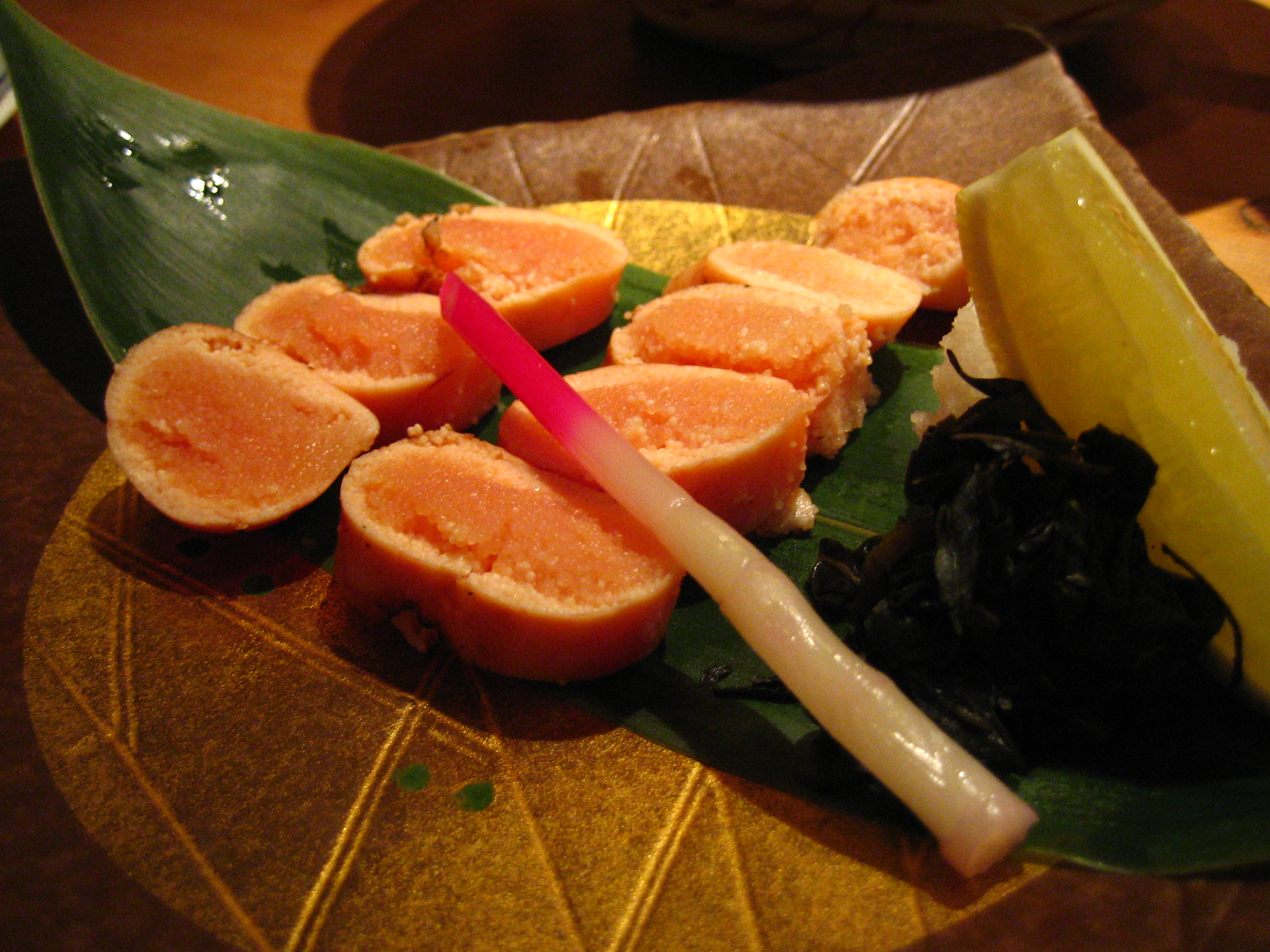
Grilled mentaiko

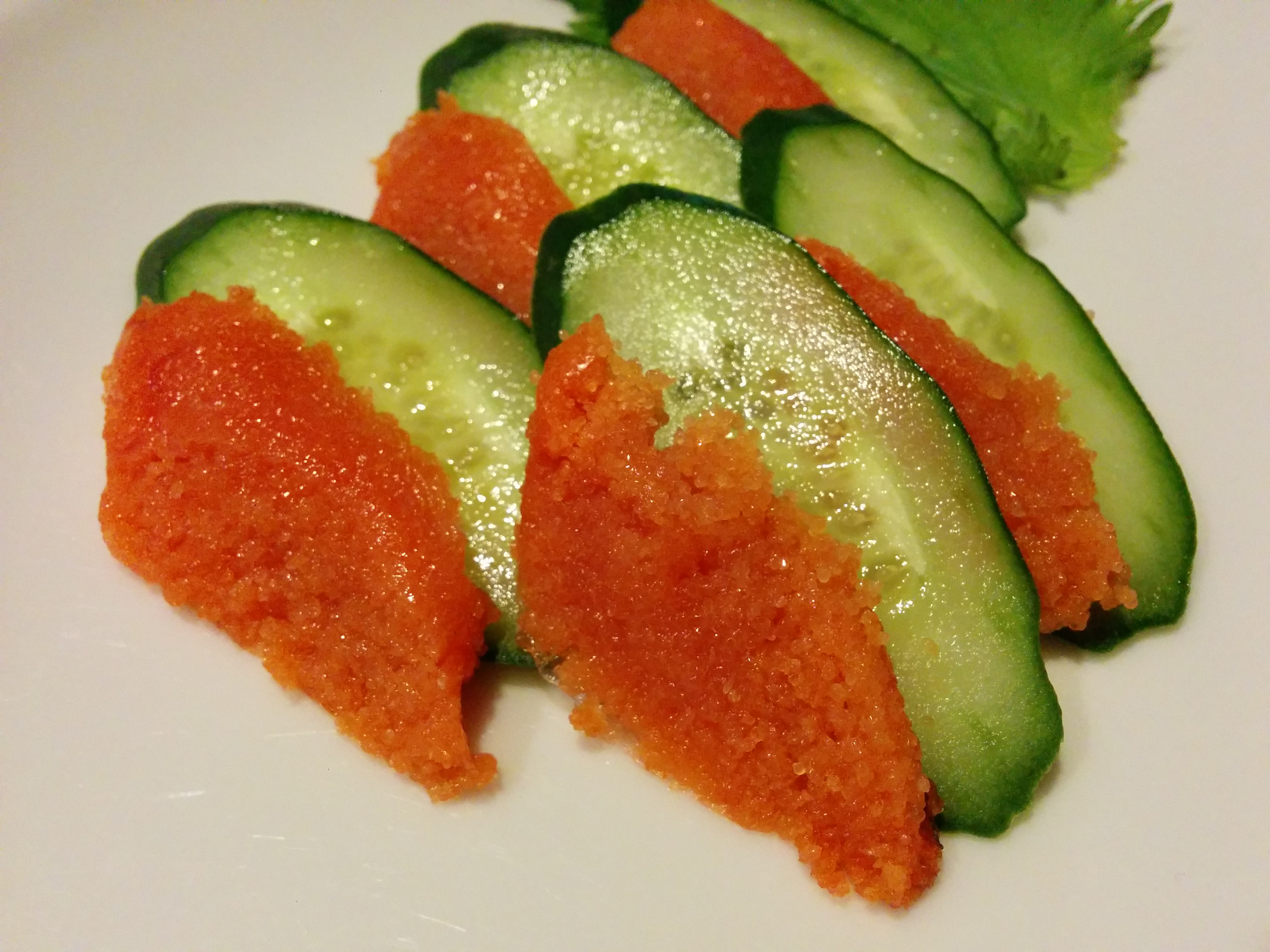
Raw mentaiko with cucumber

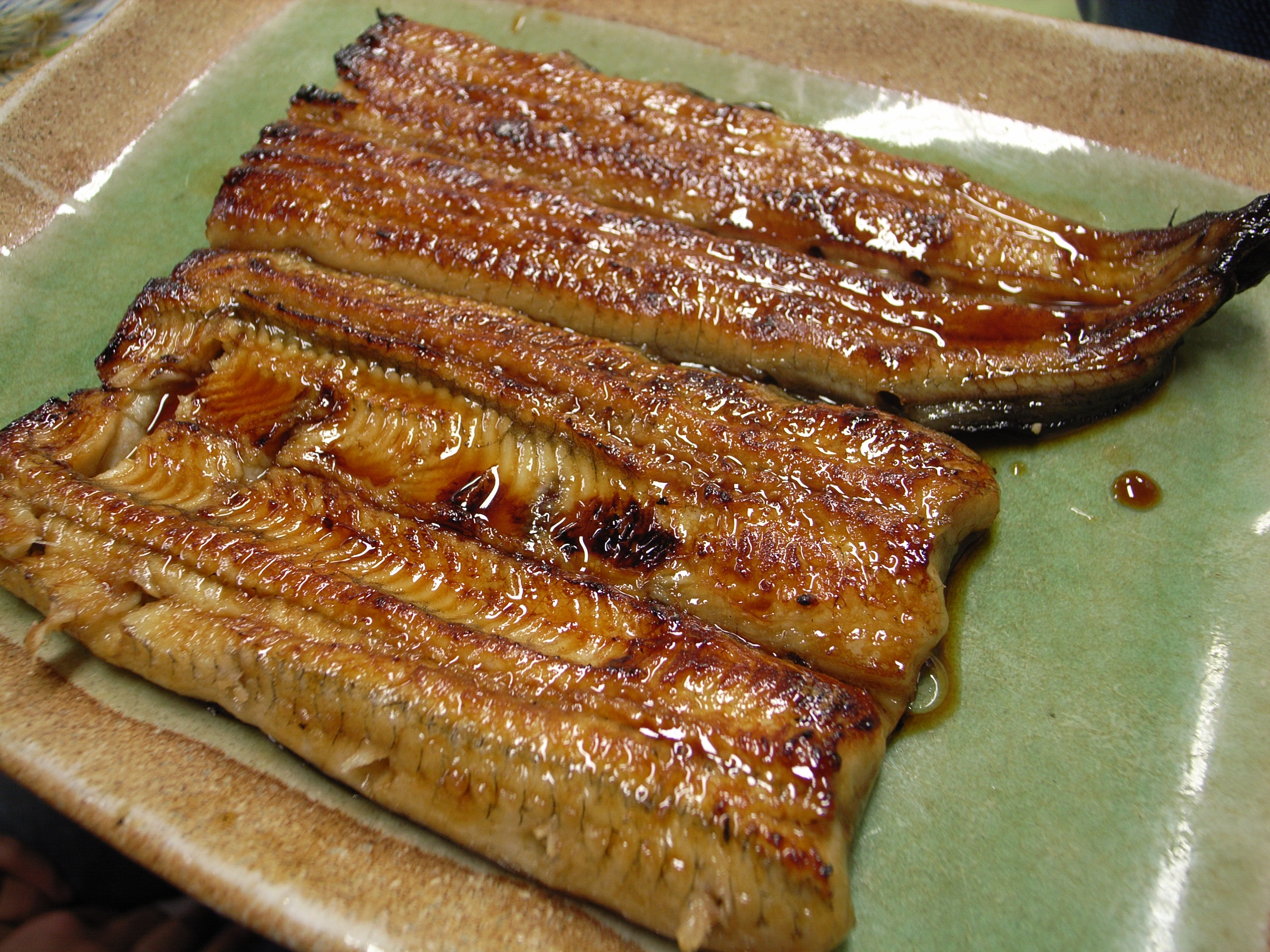
Unagi kabayaki, grilled eel

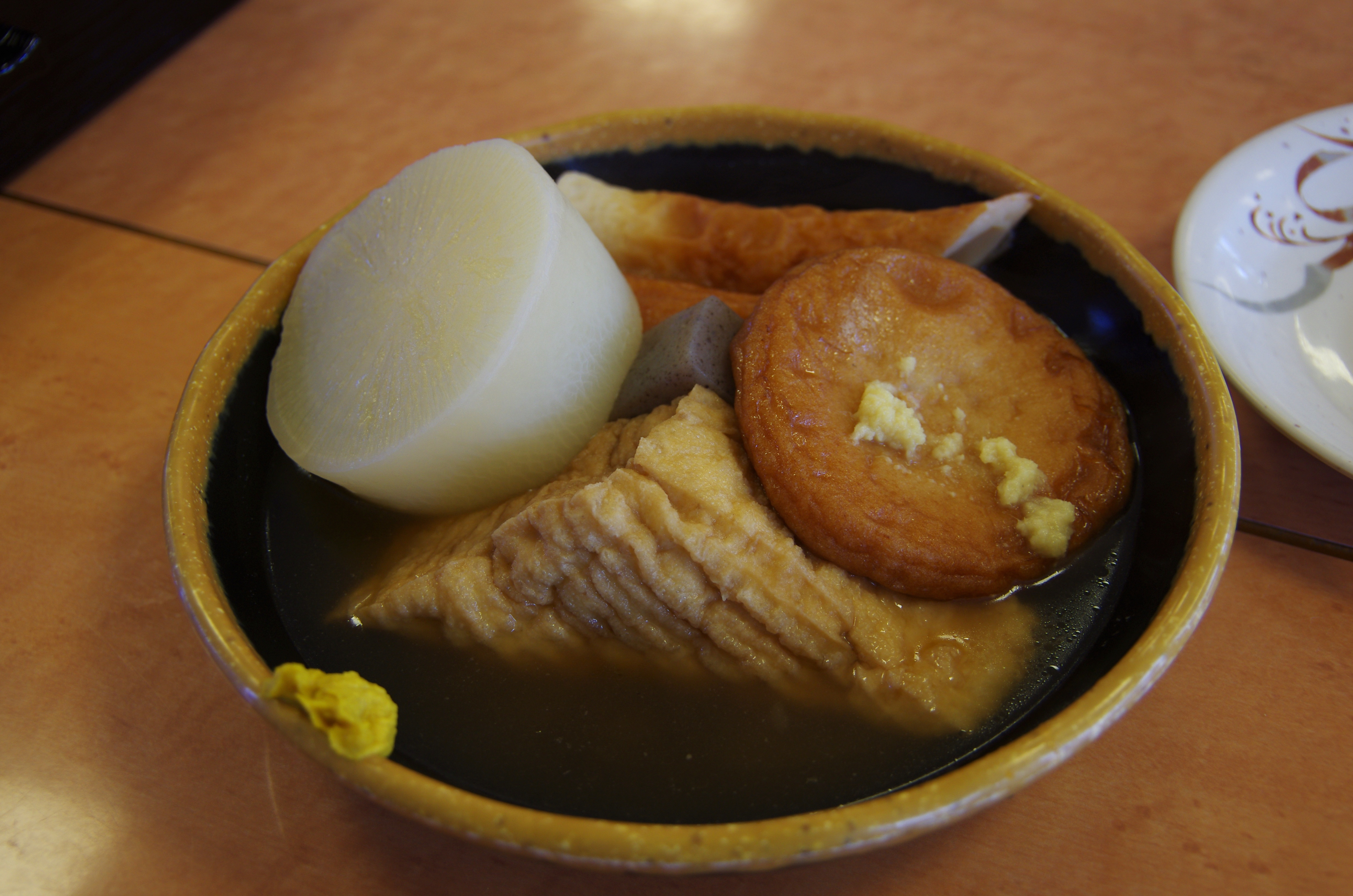
Oden

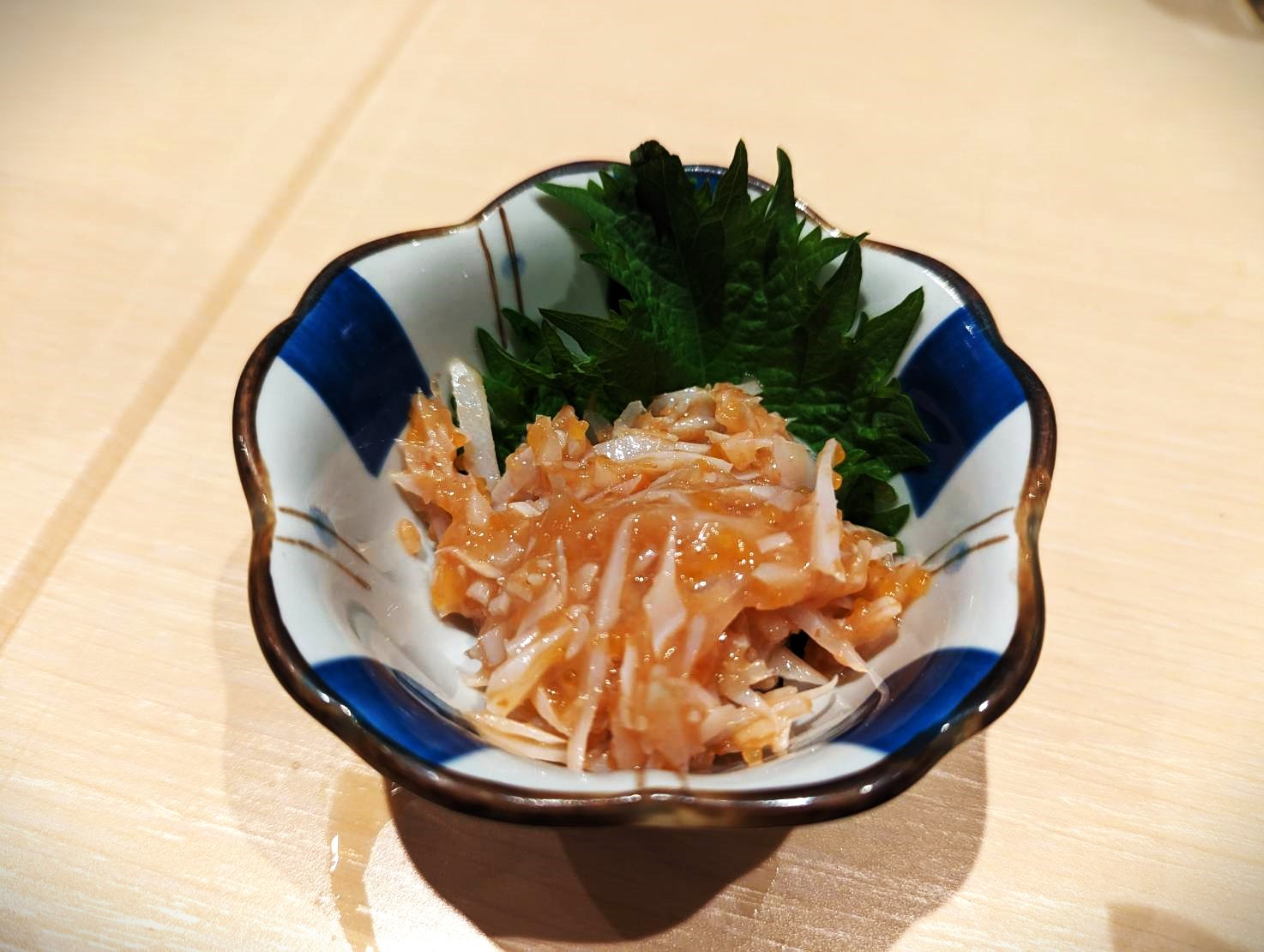
Finely chopped shark cartilage dressed with pickled plum paste.
Vegetables and pickles

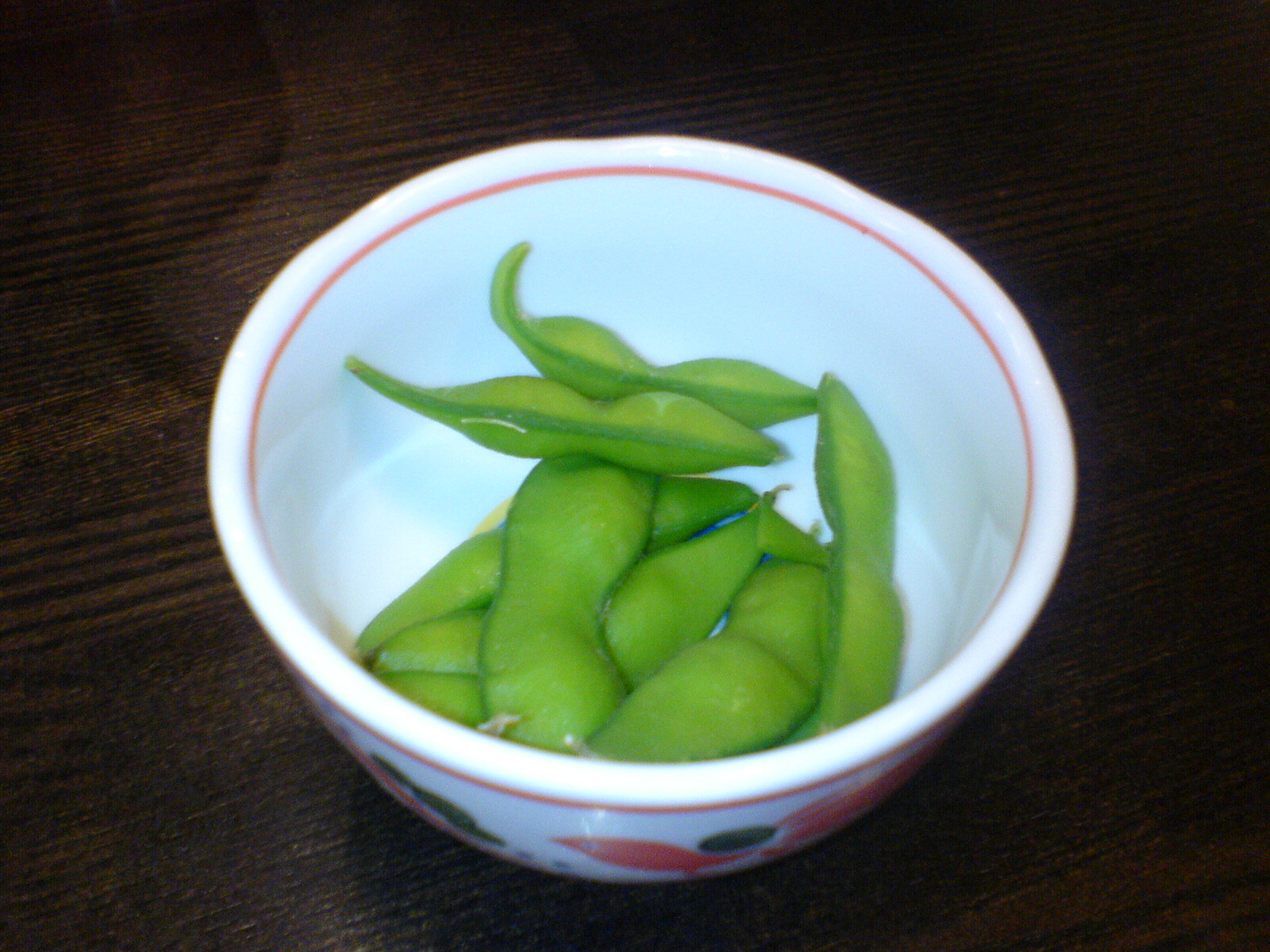
Edamame

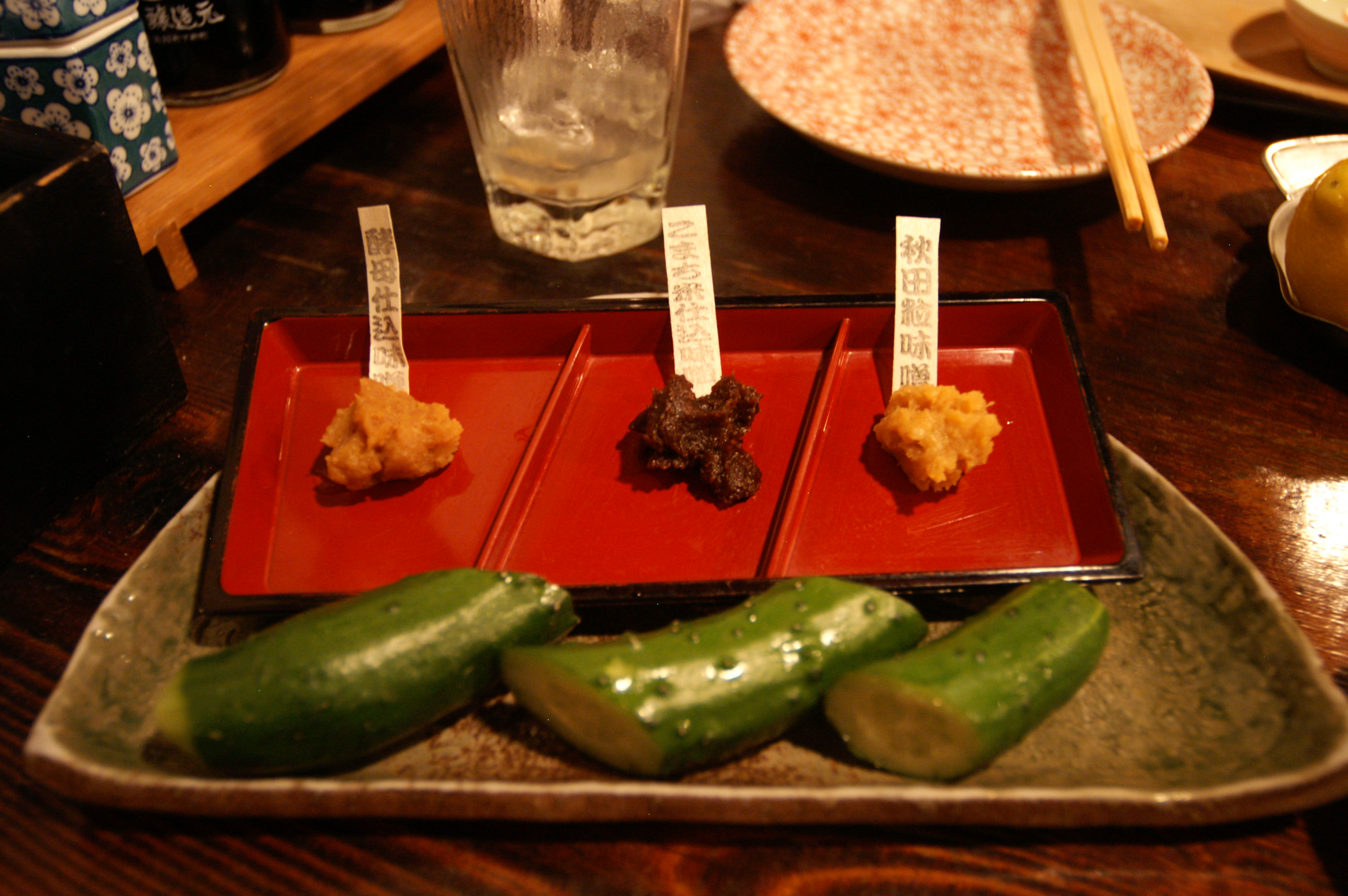
Cucumber with hatcho miso

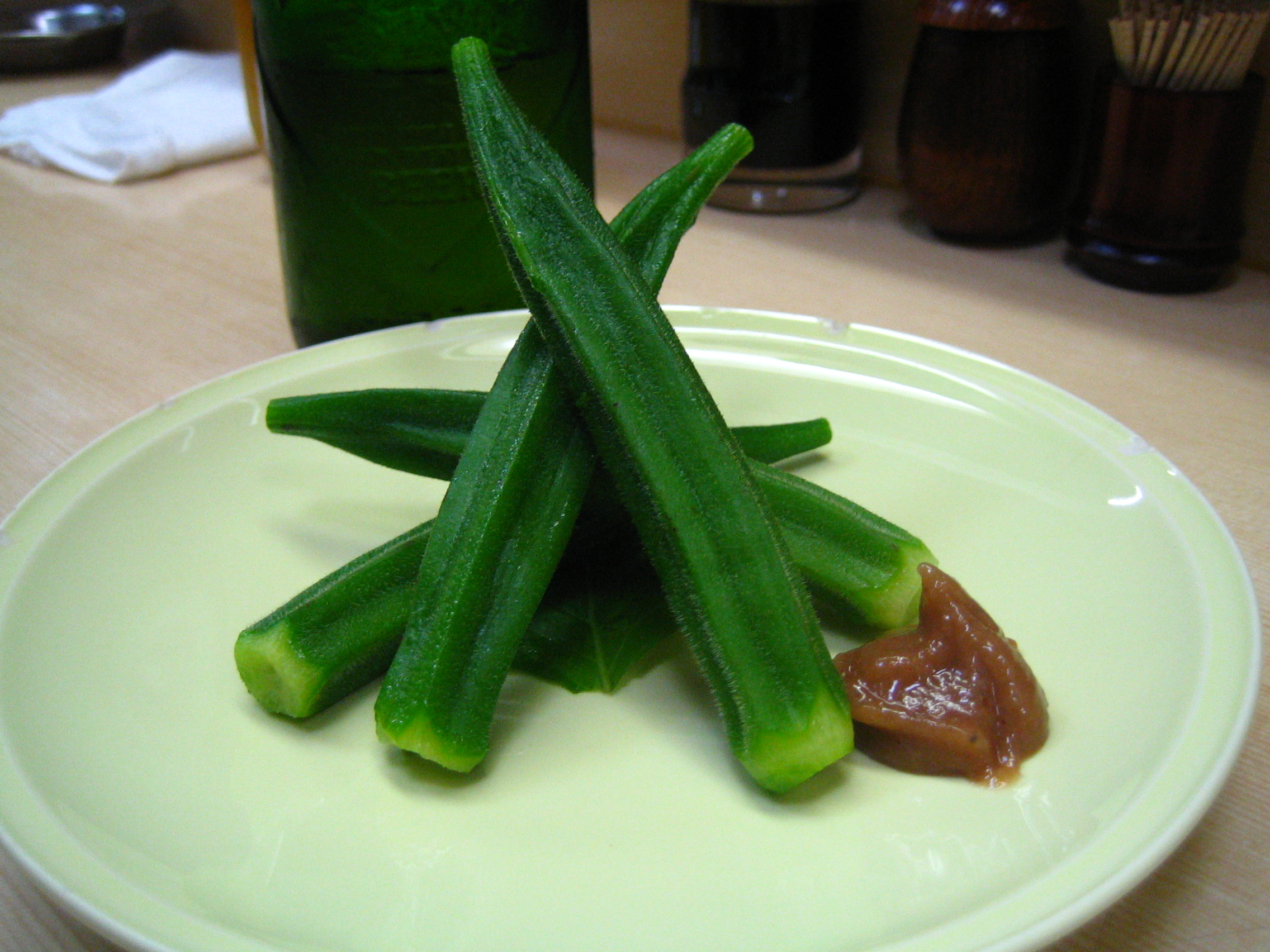
Boiled okra with umeboshi paste

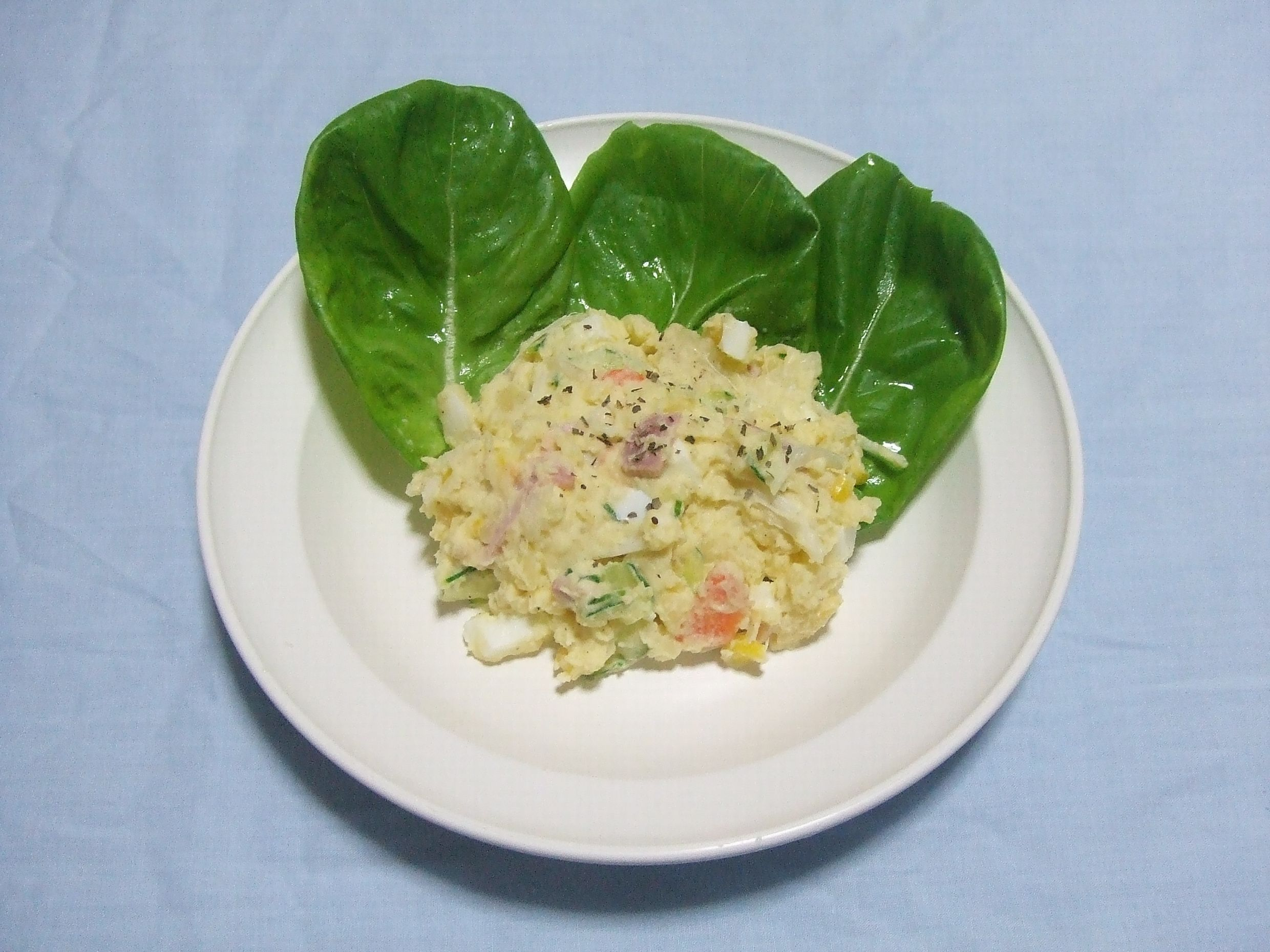
Japanese potato salad

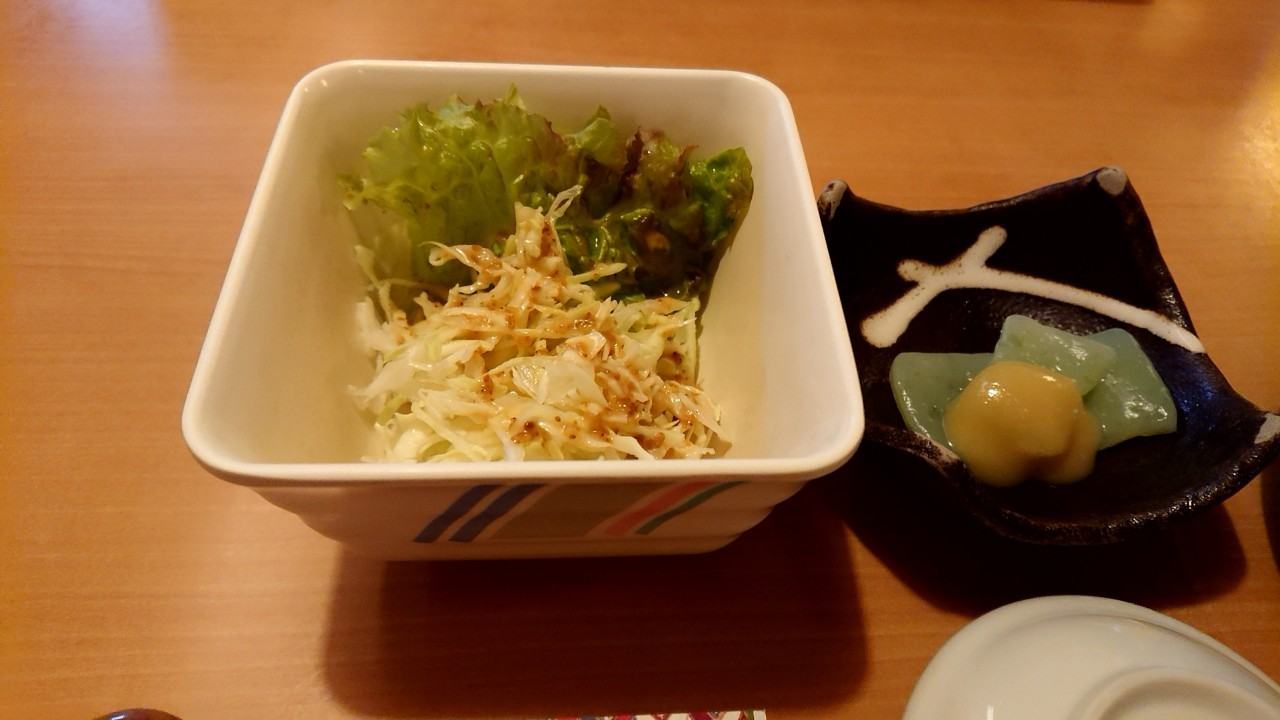
Cabbage salad

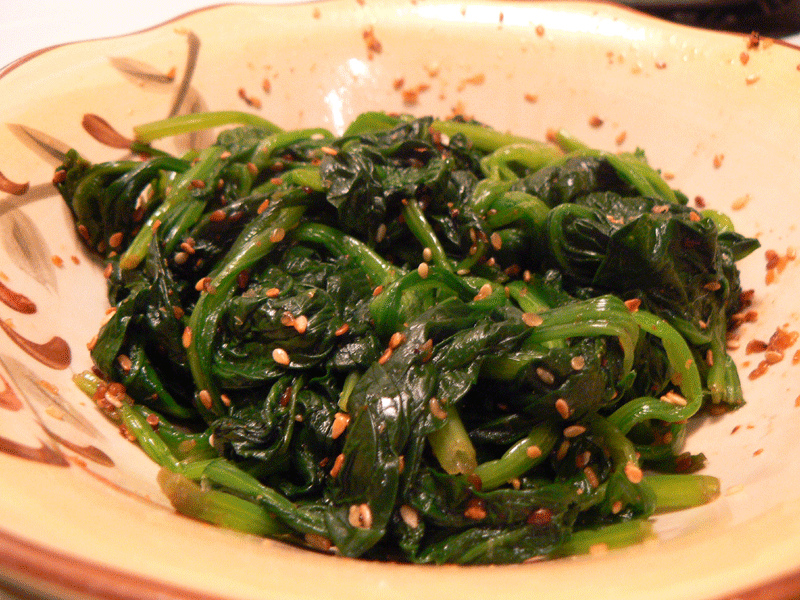
Goma-ae, spinach salad in sesame dressing

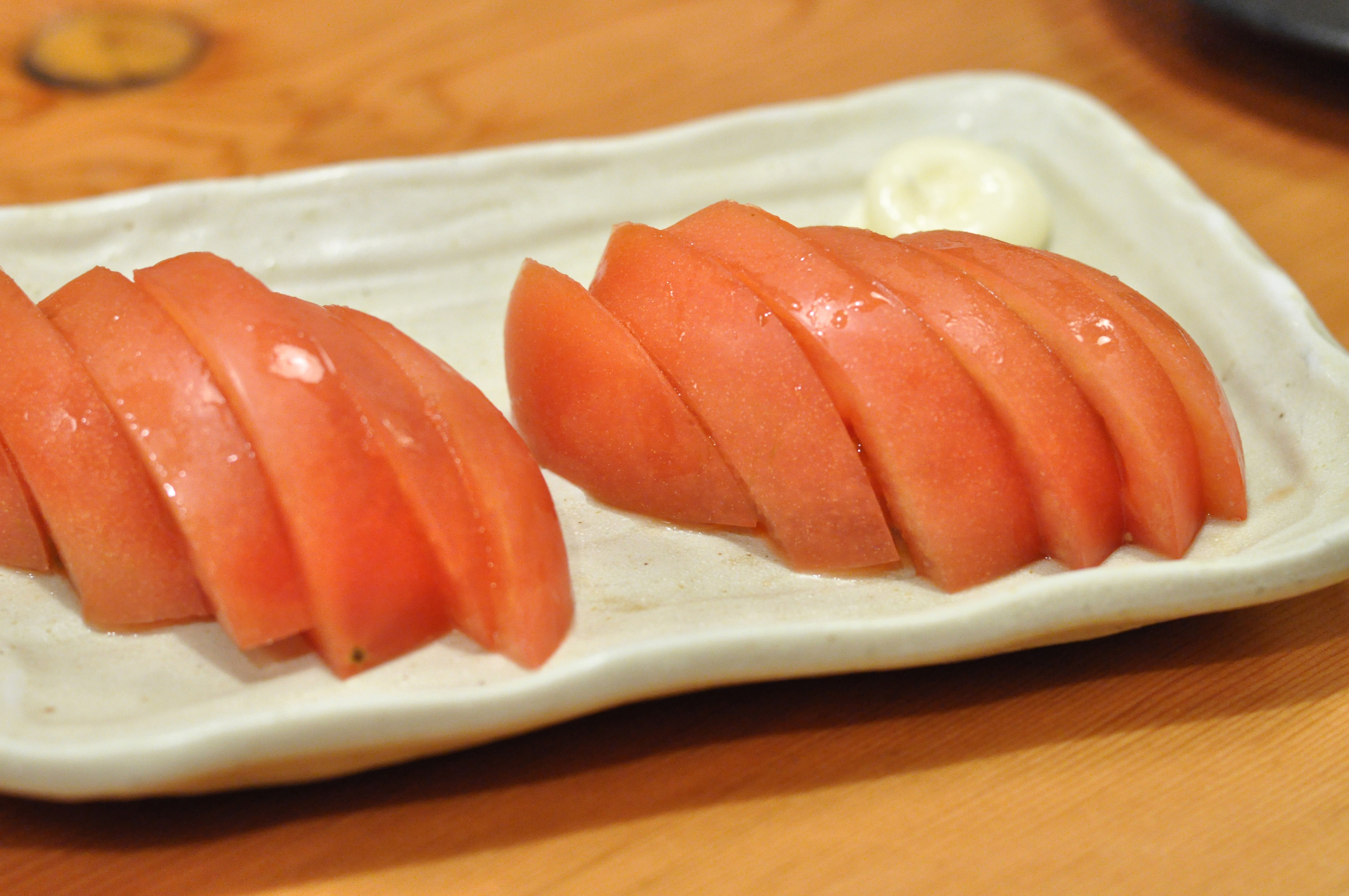
Tomato marinated in dashi

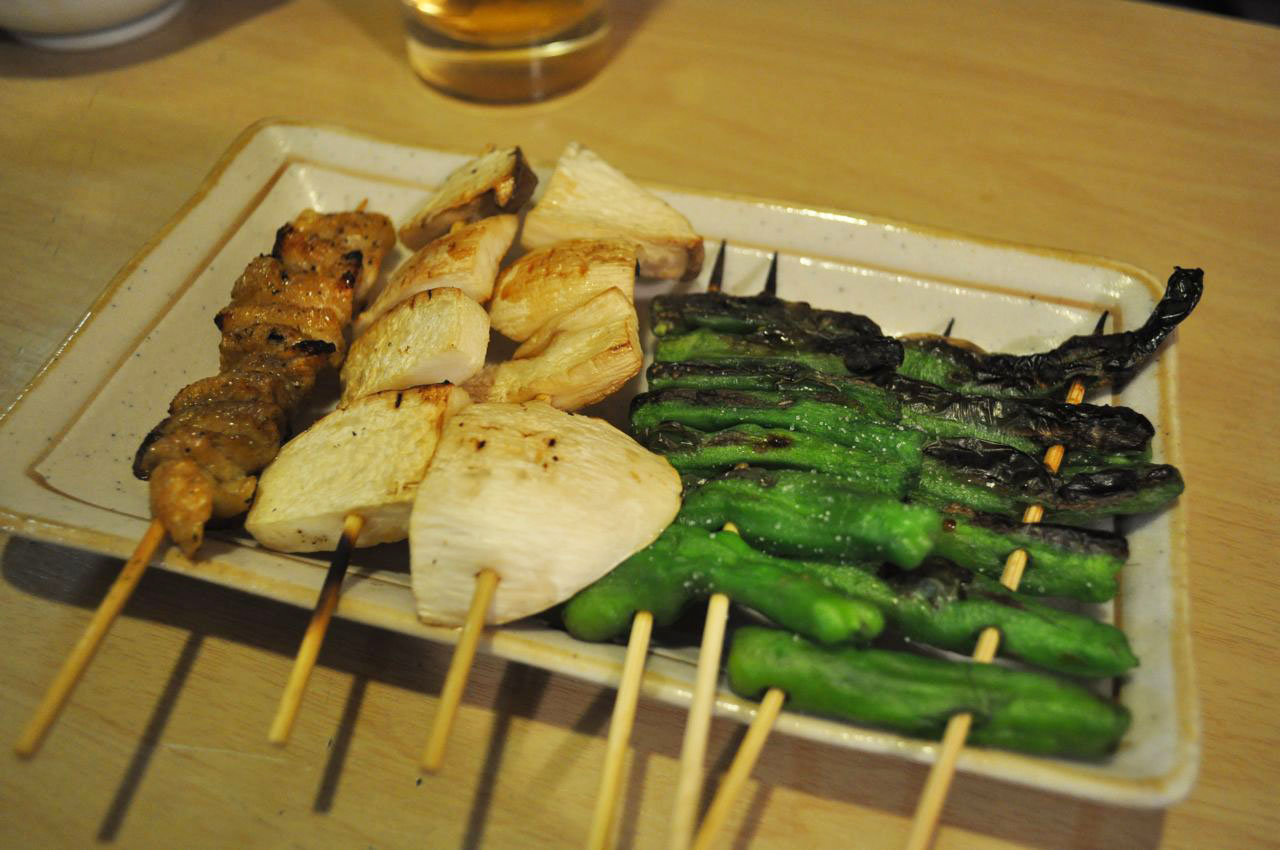
Grilled kawa (chicken skin), yamaimo, shishito

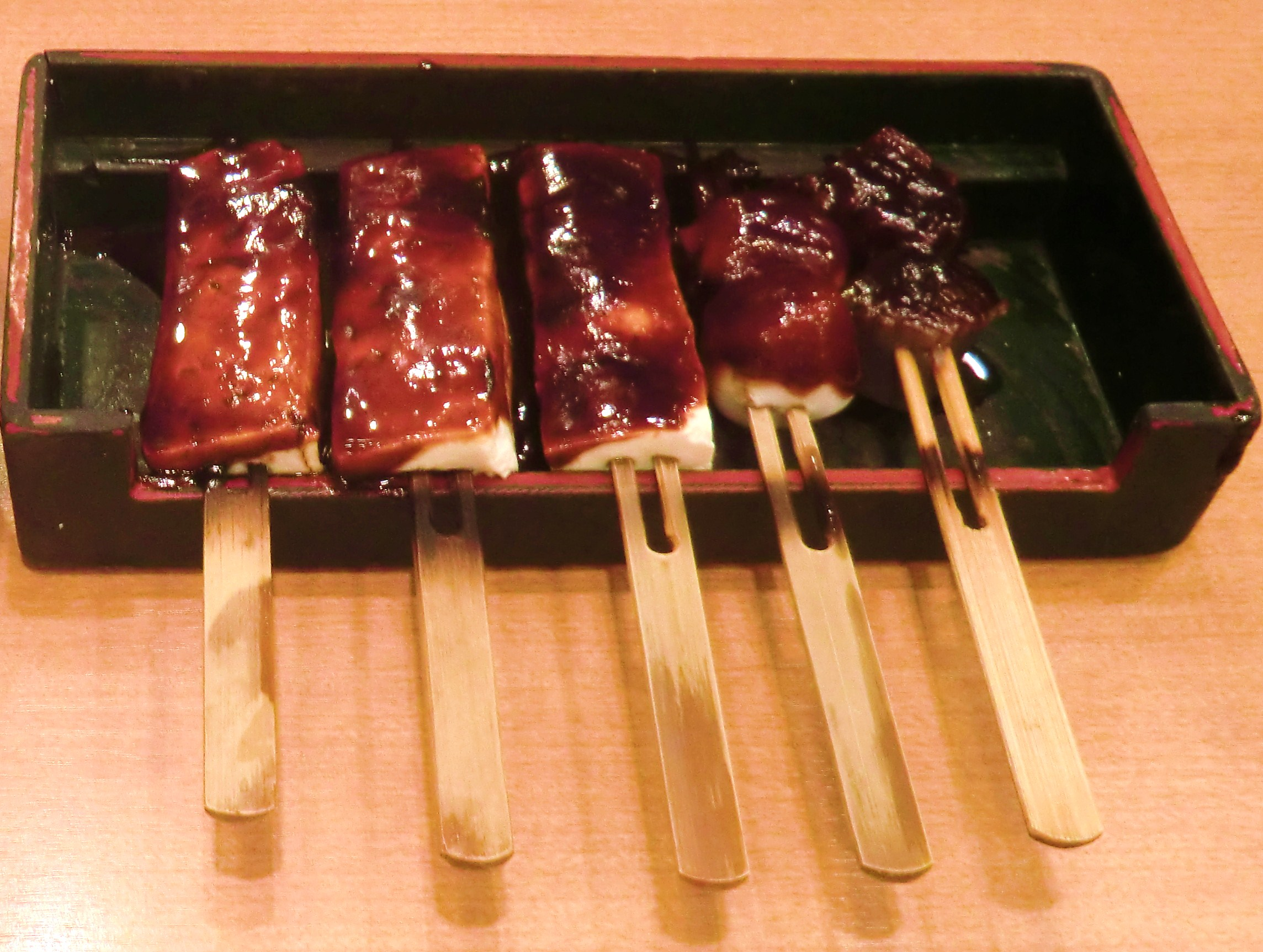
Miso dengaku, miso-grilled eggplant

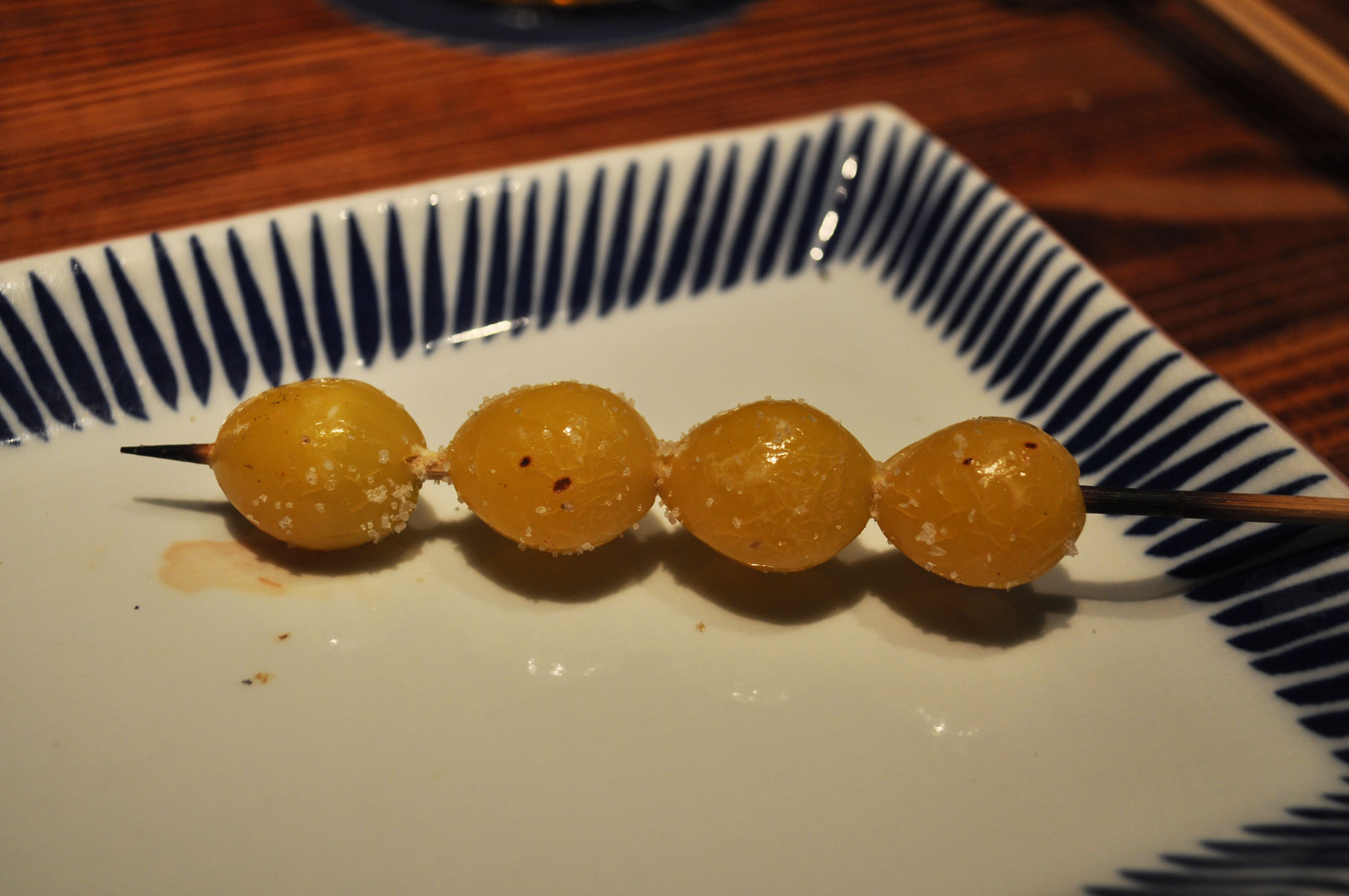
Roasted ginkgo nuts

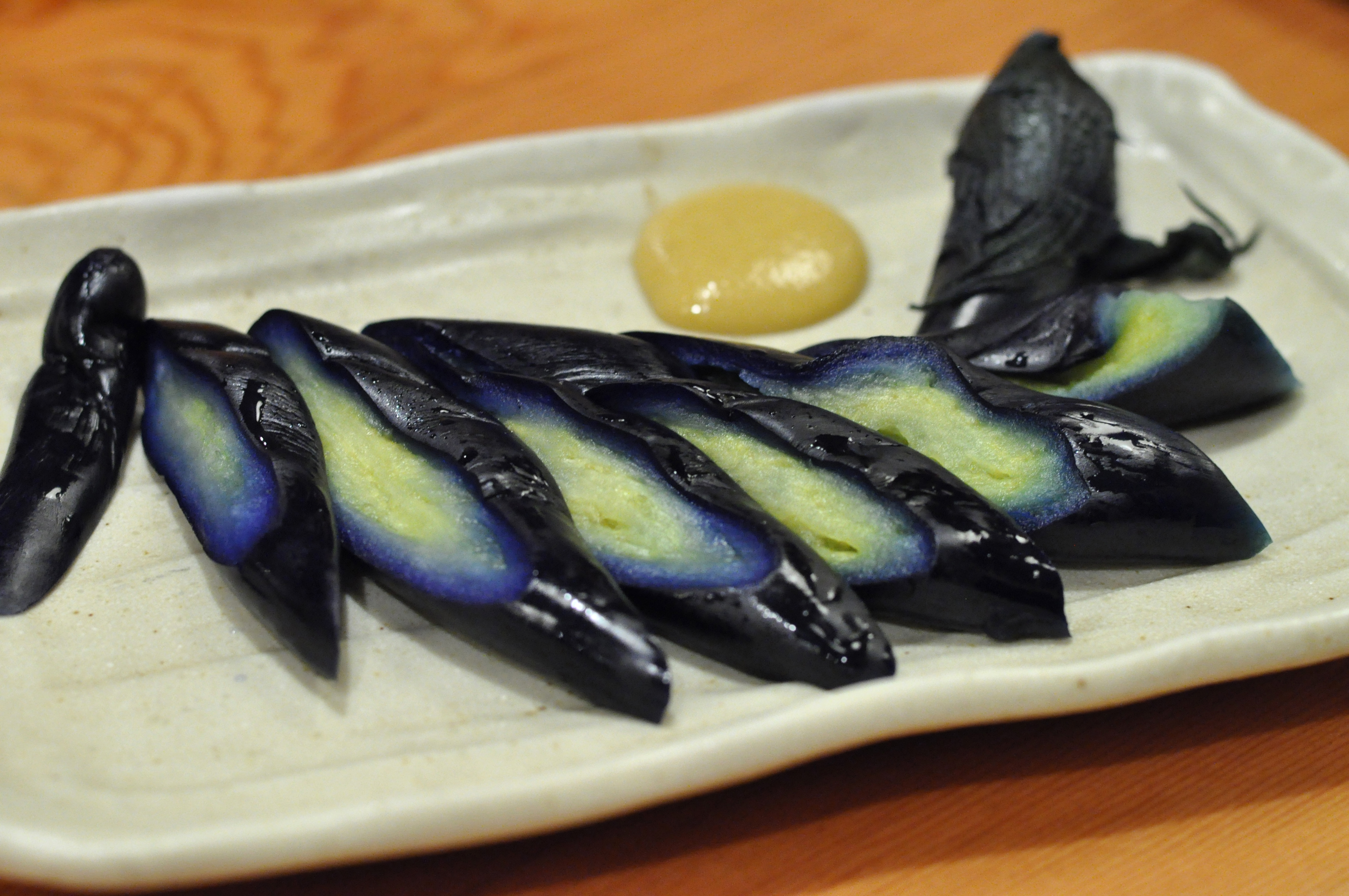
Asazuke eggplant

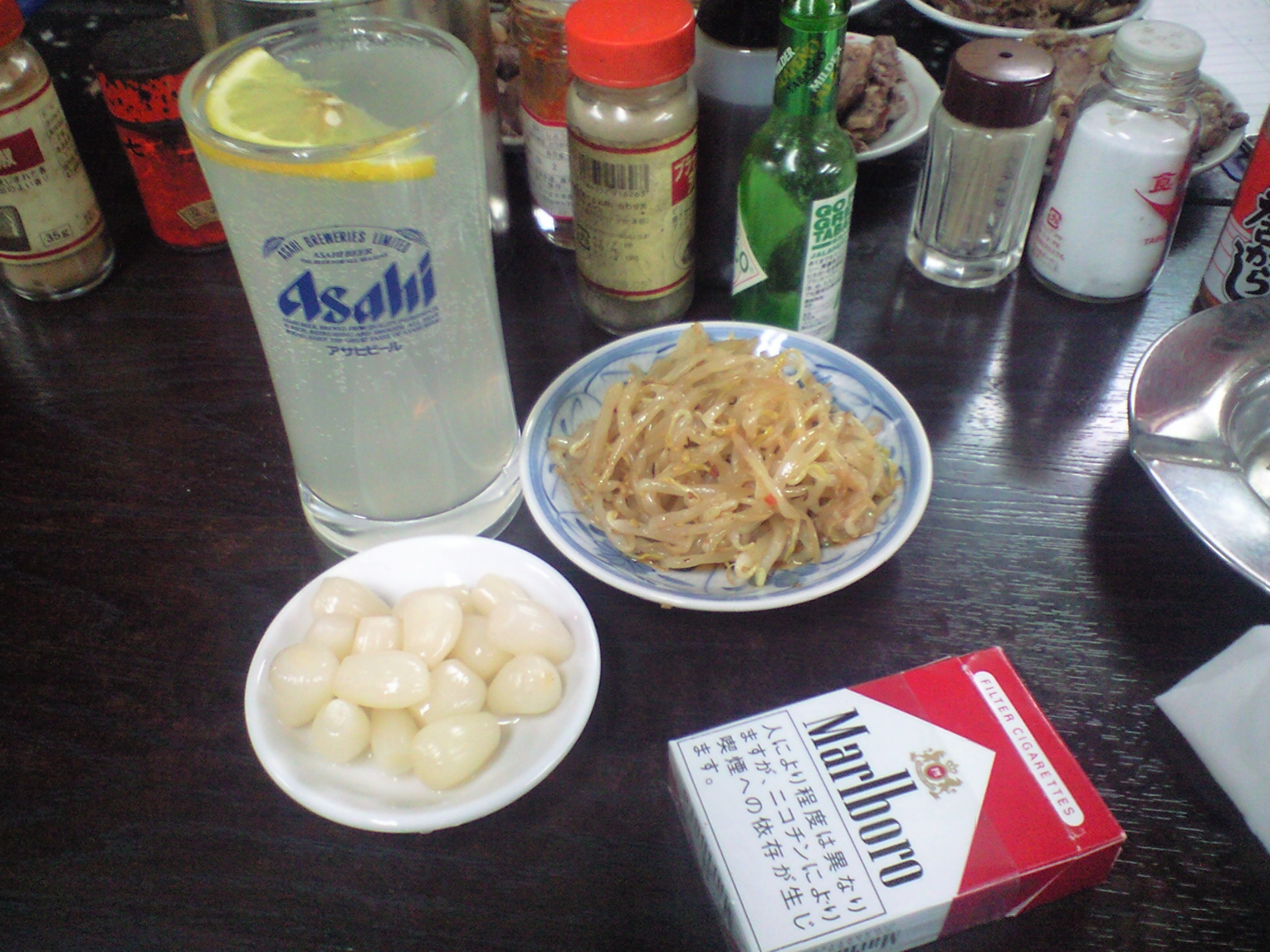
Bean sprout namul and pickled rakkyo

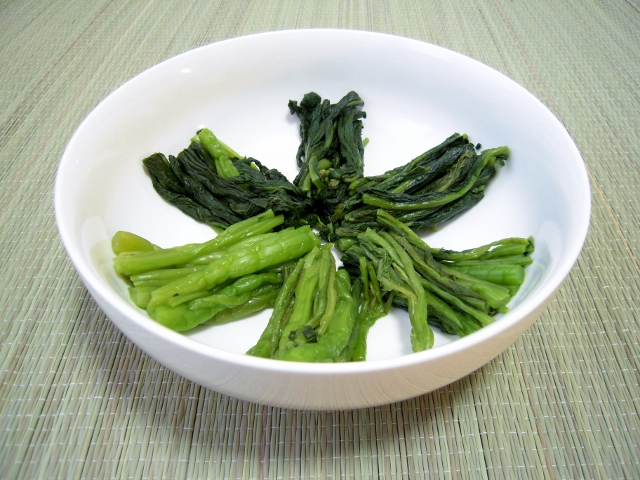
Takanazuke, pickled mustard greens

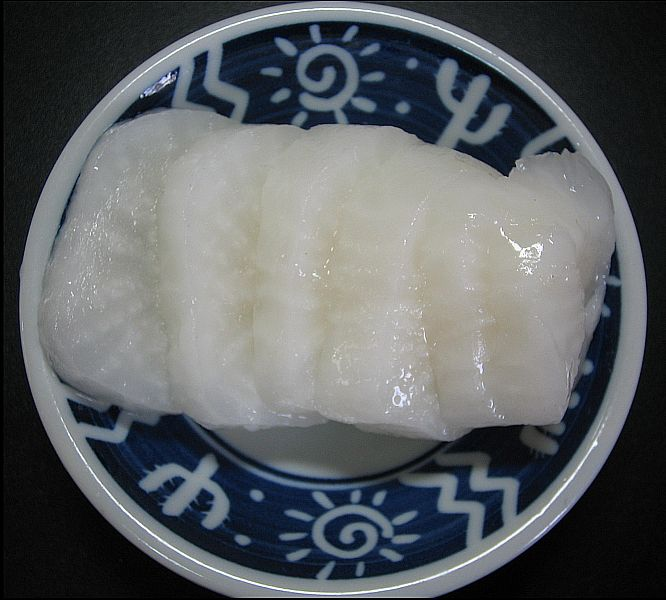
Bettarazuke, pickled daikon

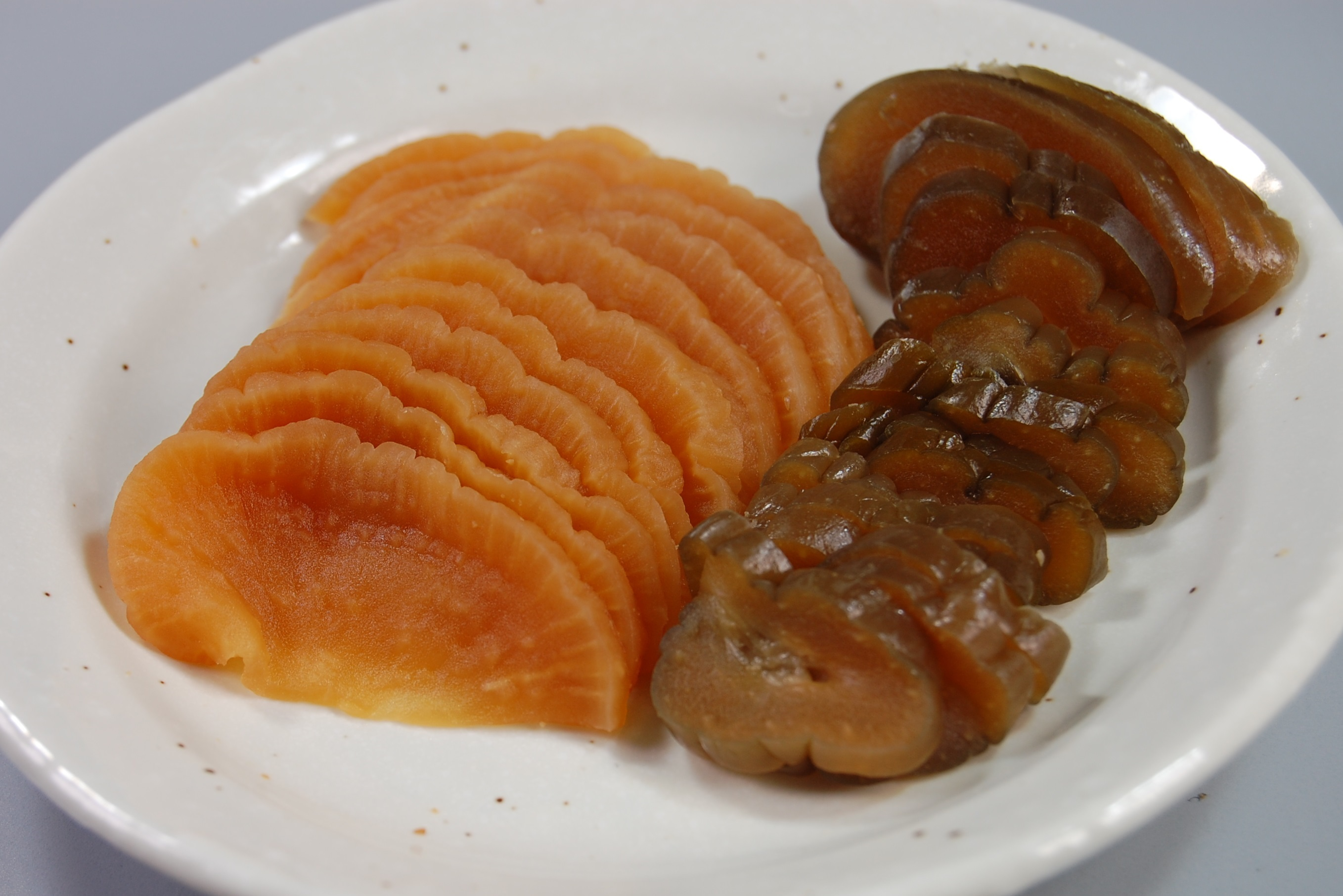
Miso-pickled daikon and cucumber
Meat and poultry

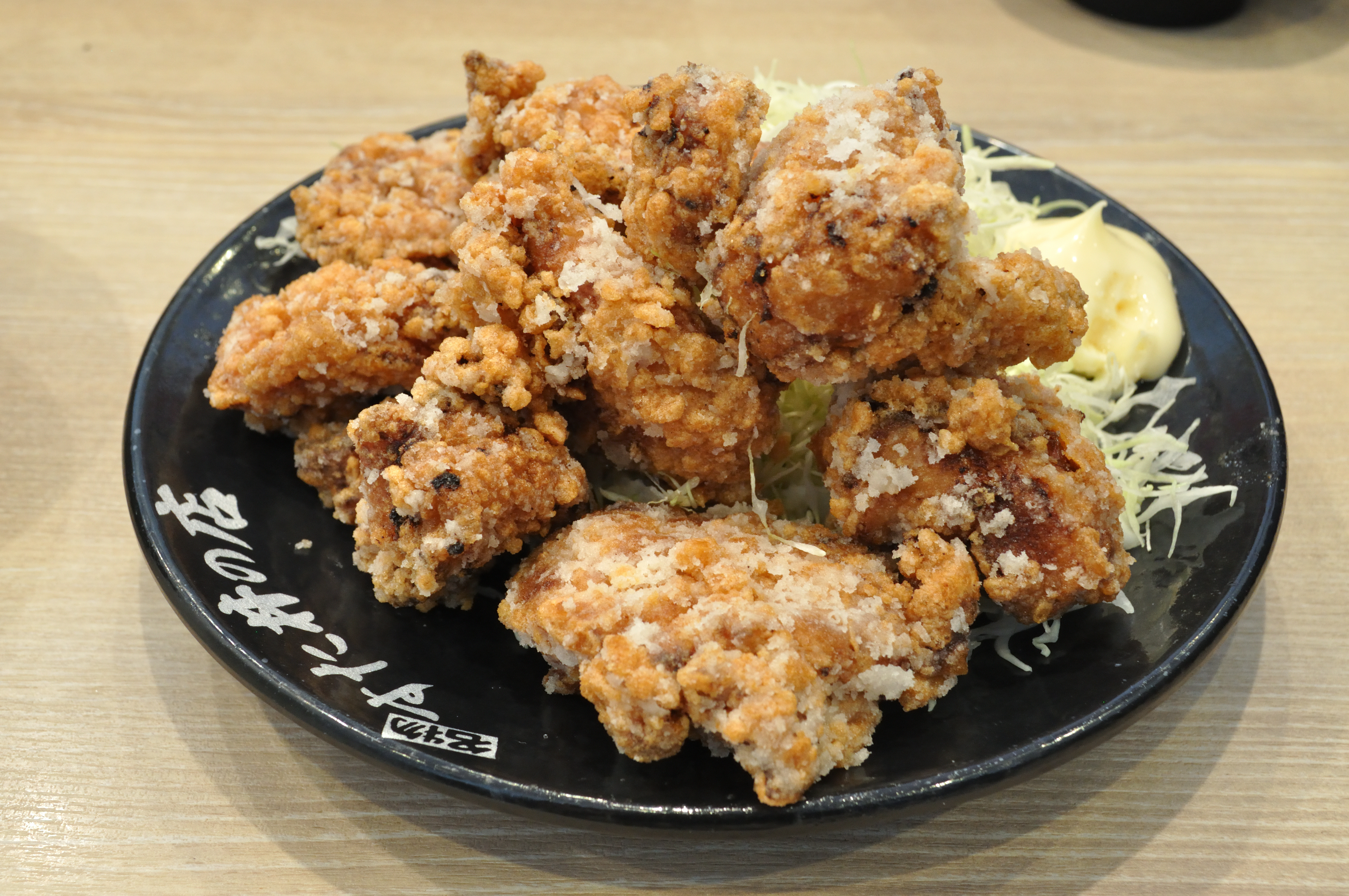
Karaage

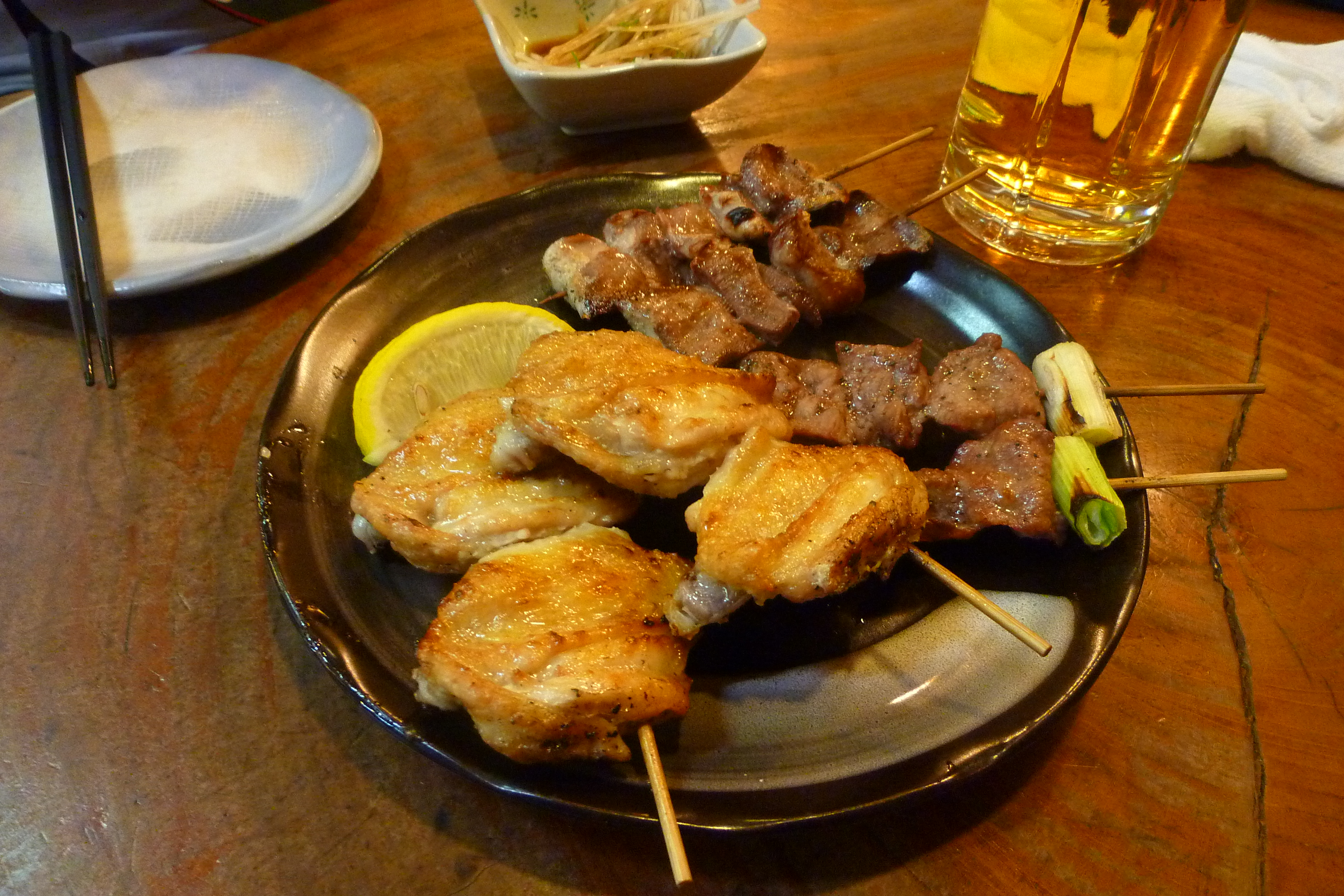
Assorted yakitori

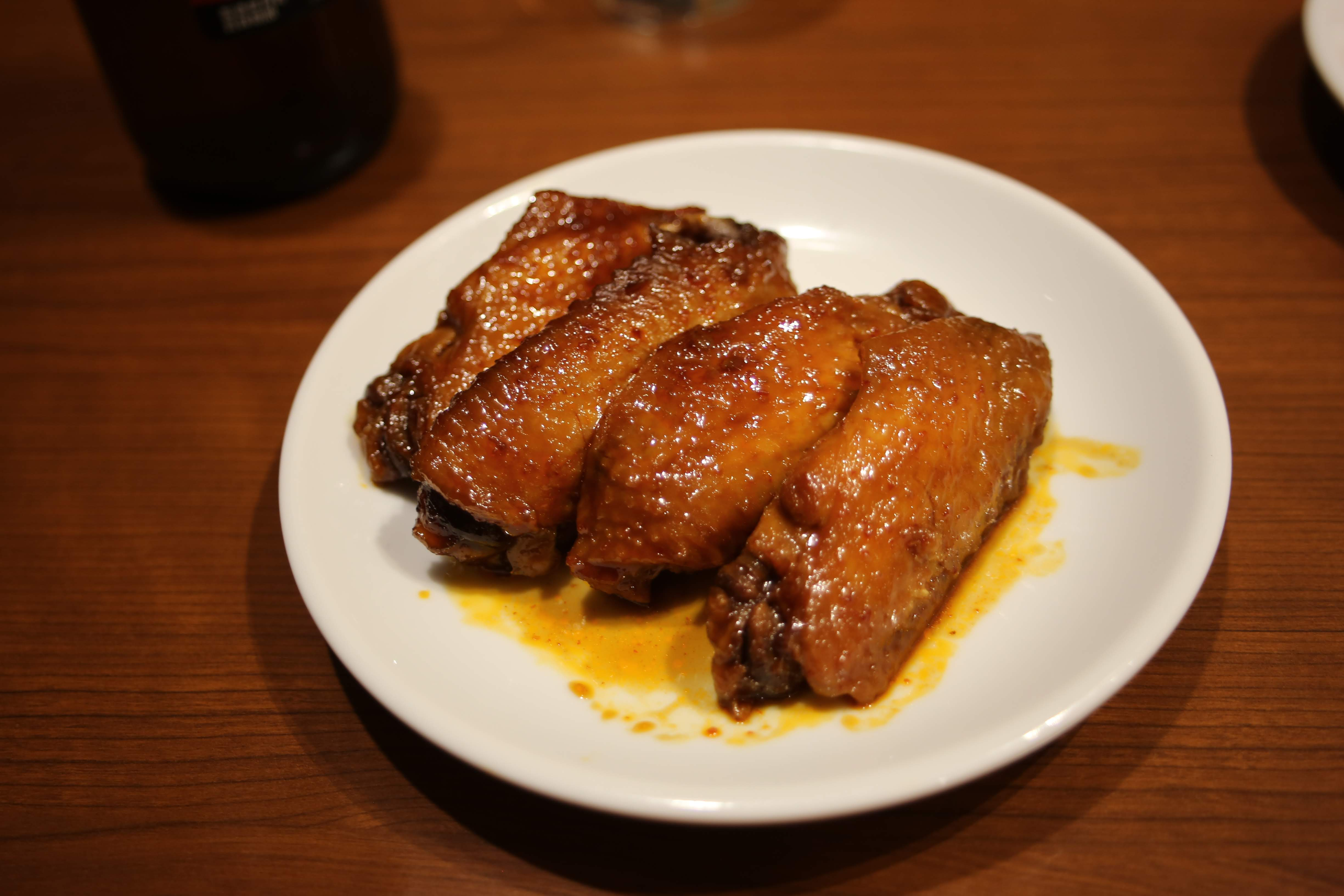
Tebasaki

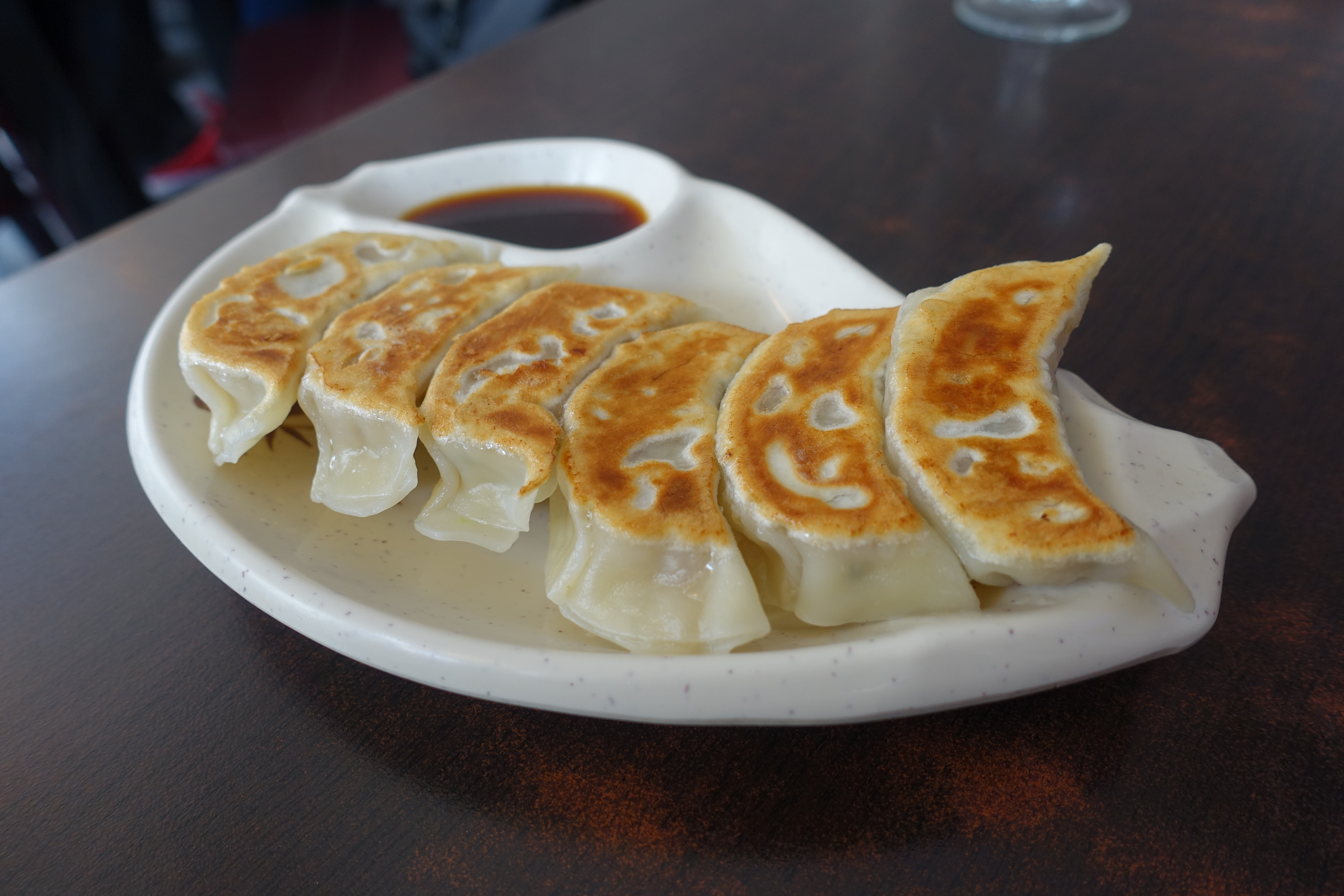
Gyoza usually contain pork.

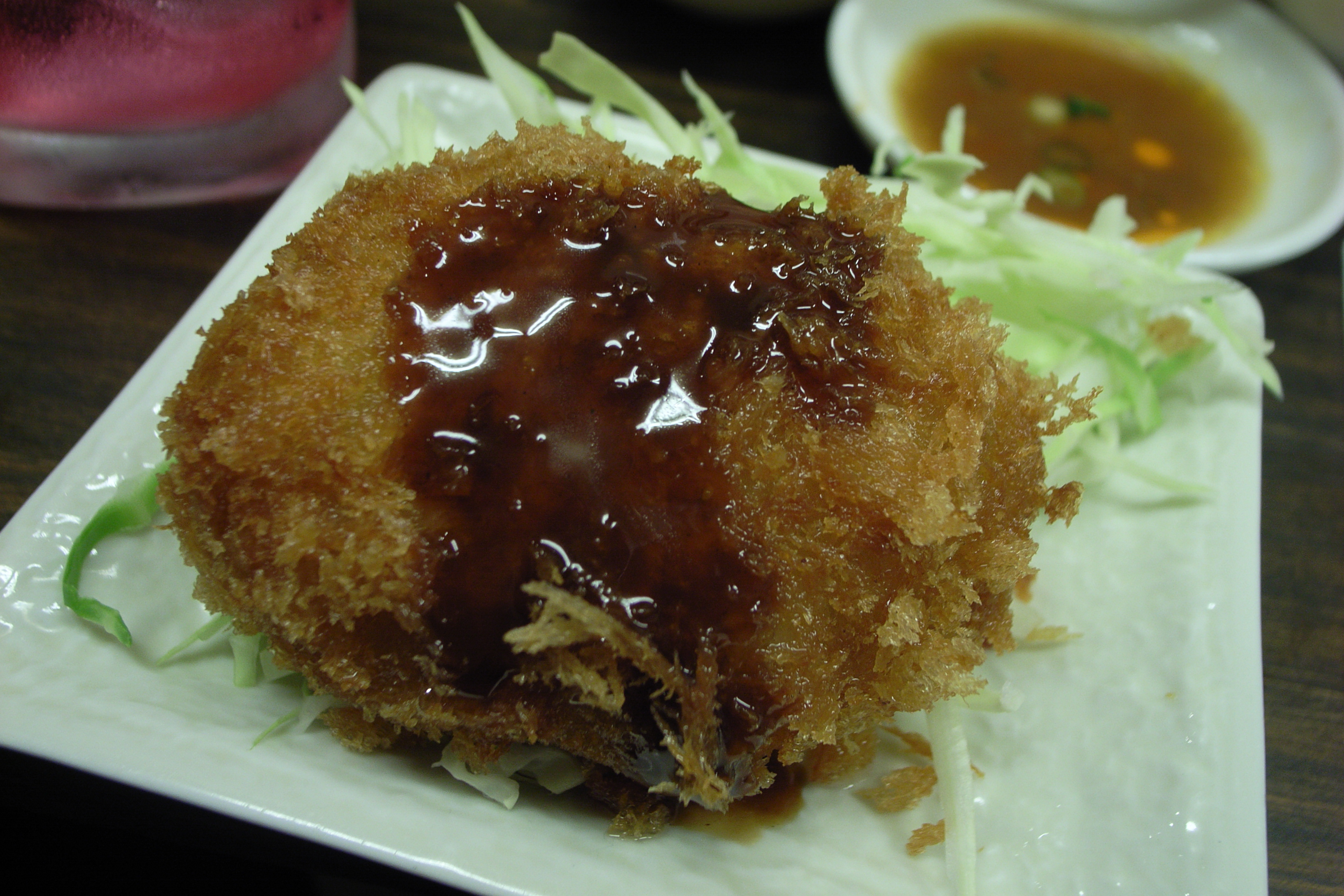
Korokke

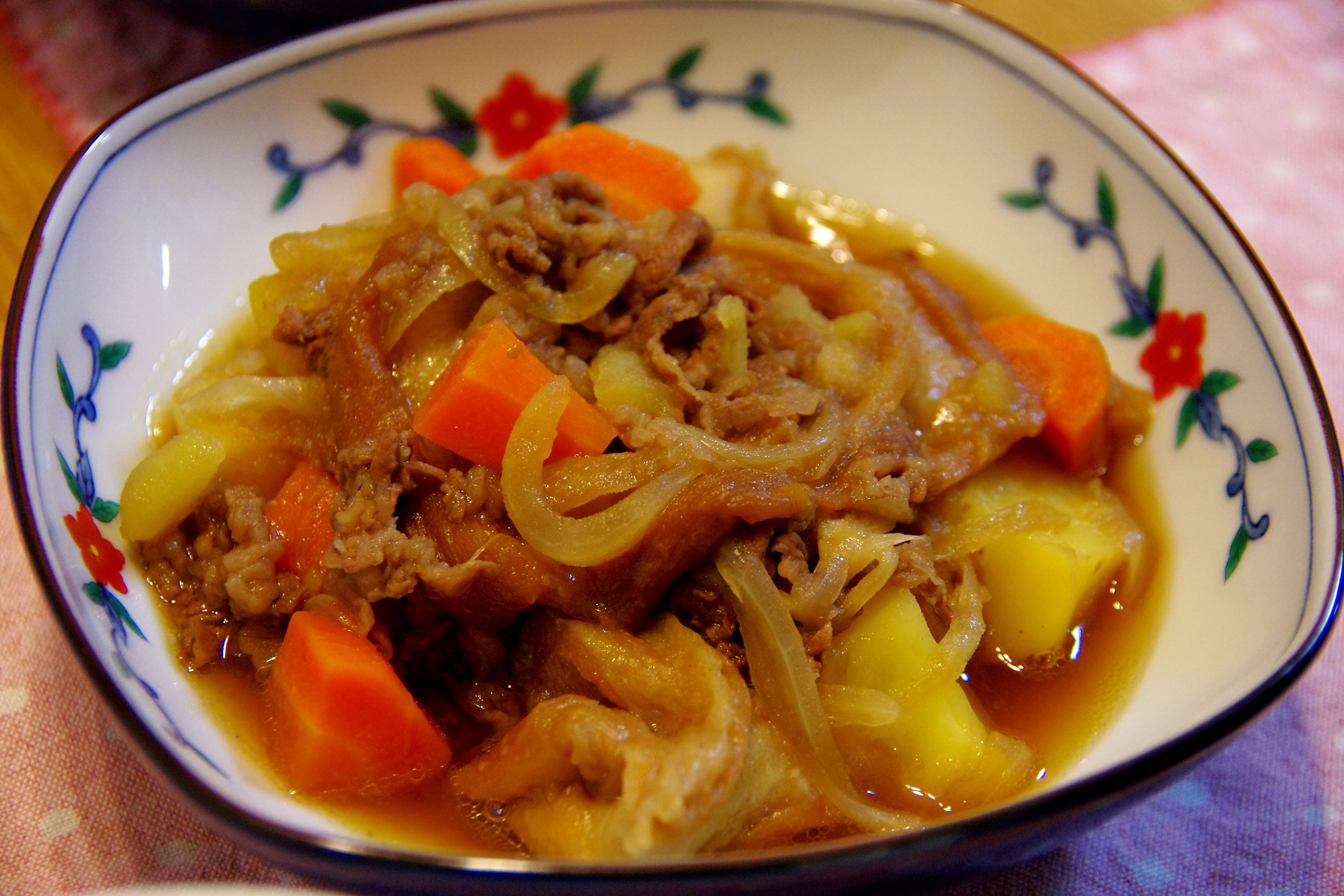
Nikujaga
Tofu and eggs

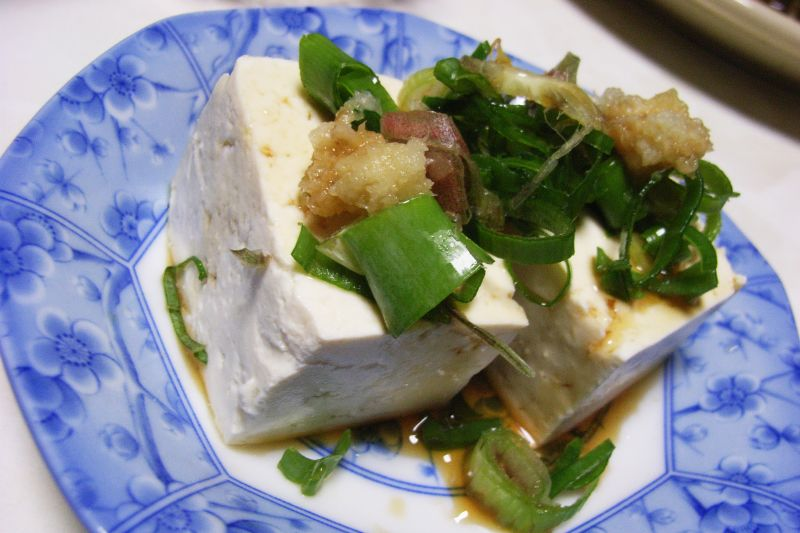
Hiyayakko

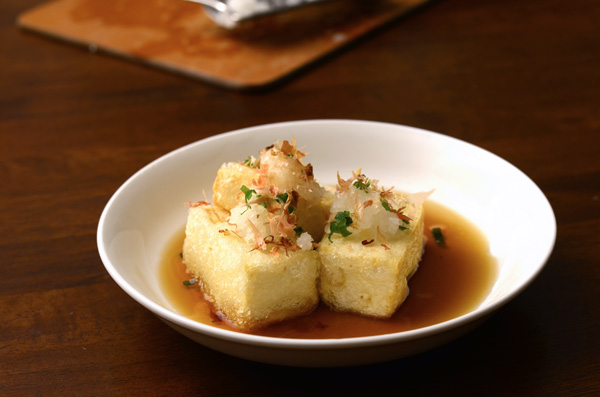
Agedashi tofu, fried tofu in dashi broth

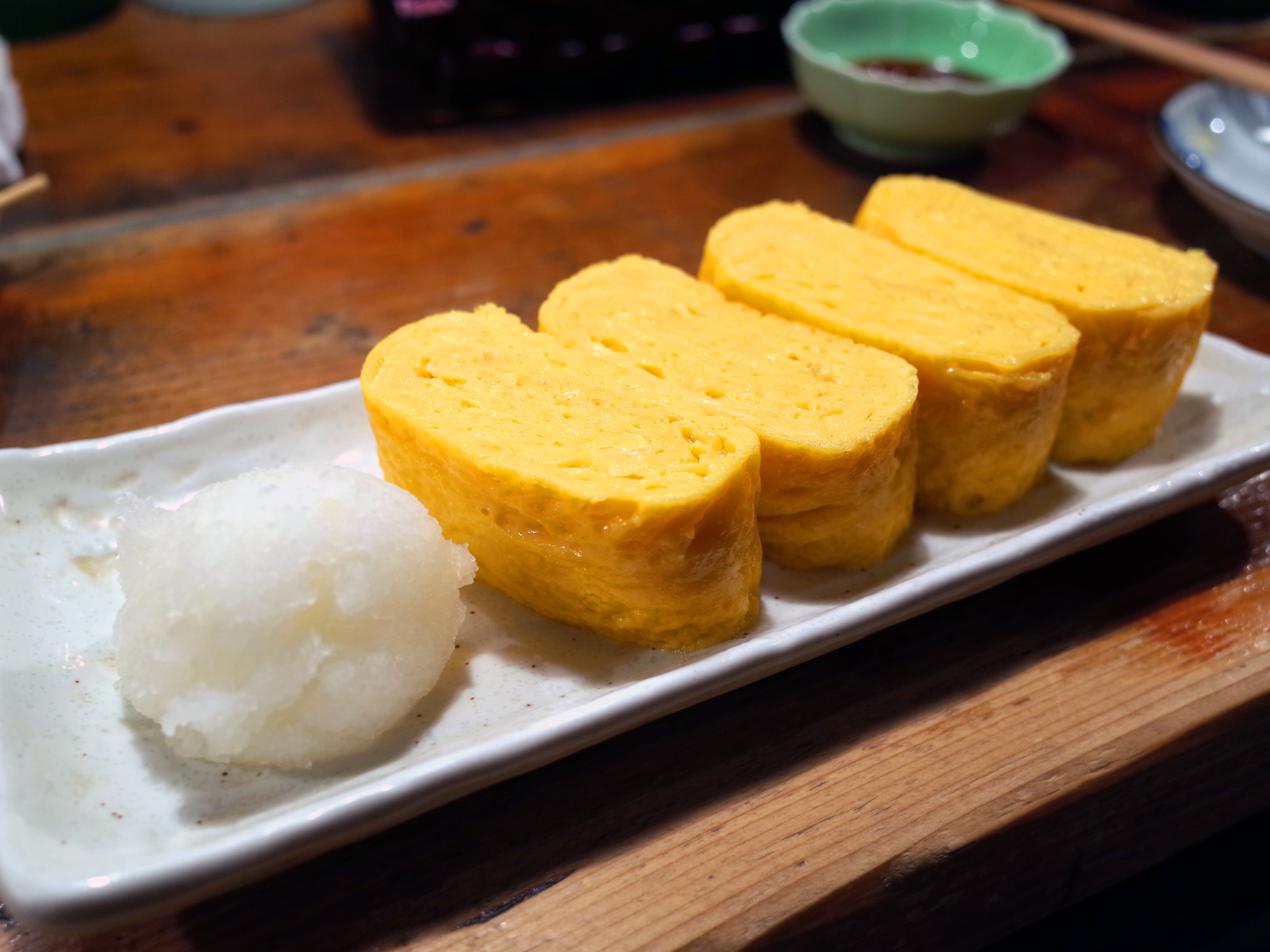
Tamagoyaki
Shime (rice and noodles)

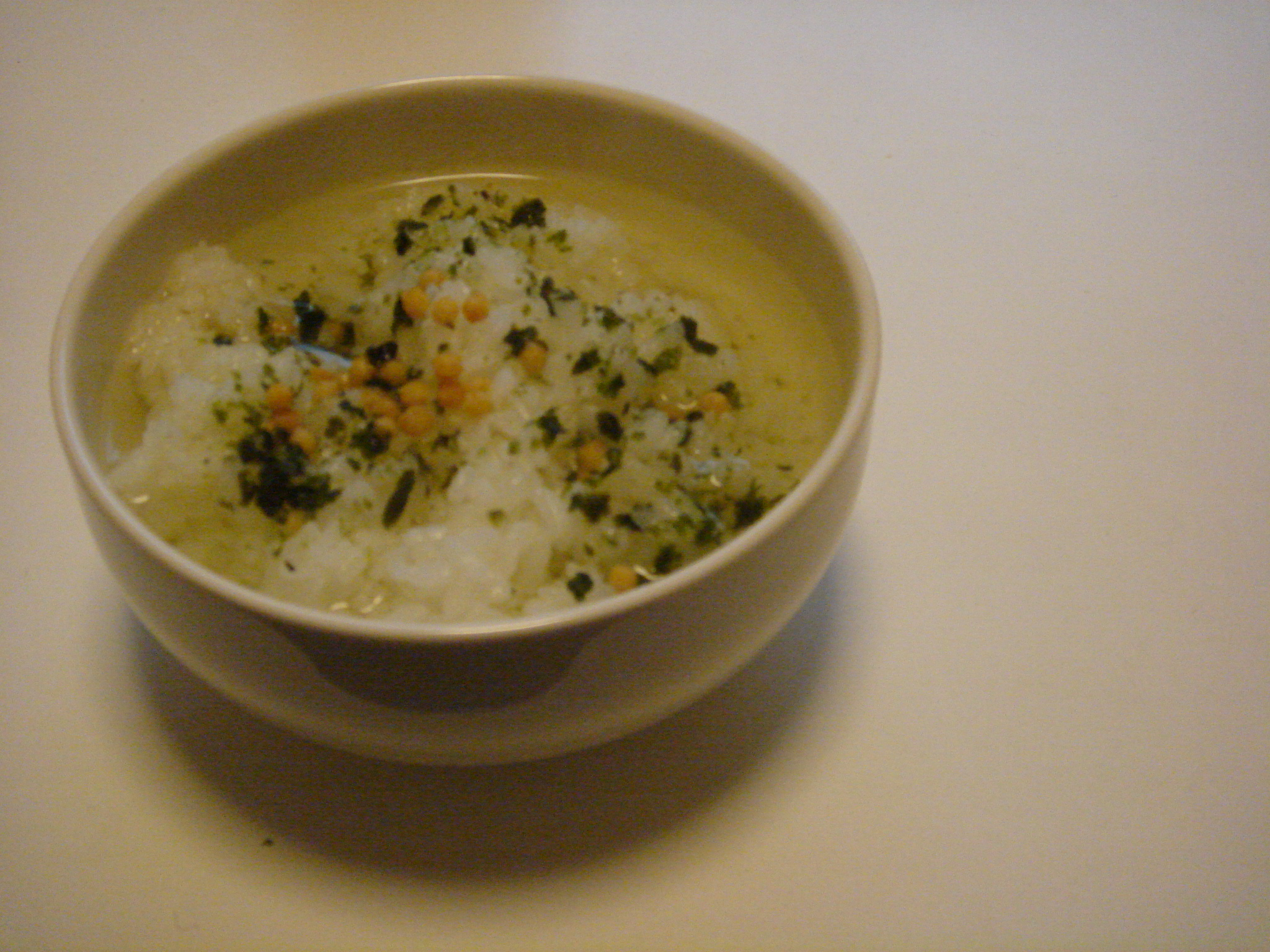
Ochazuke, green tea over rice

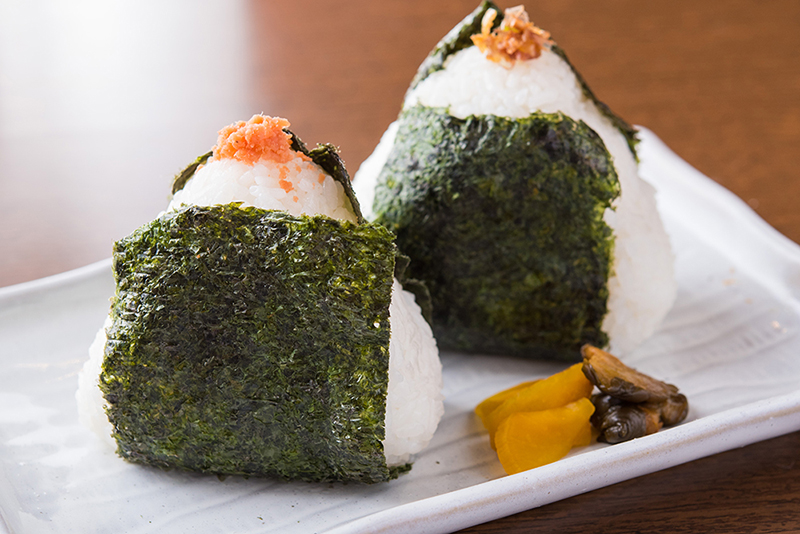
Onigiri

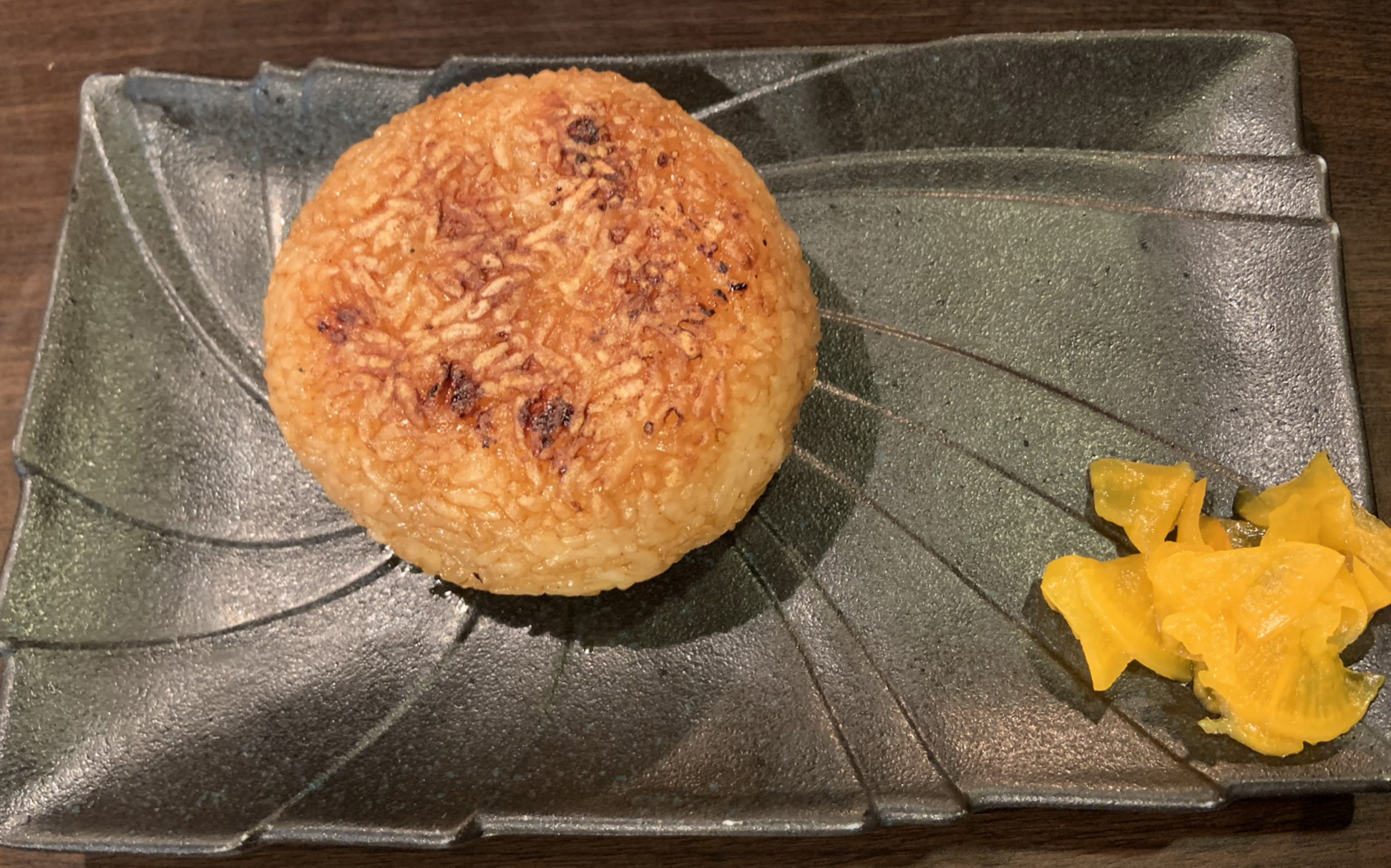
Yaki-onigiri

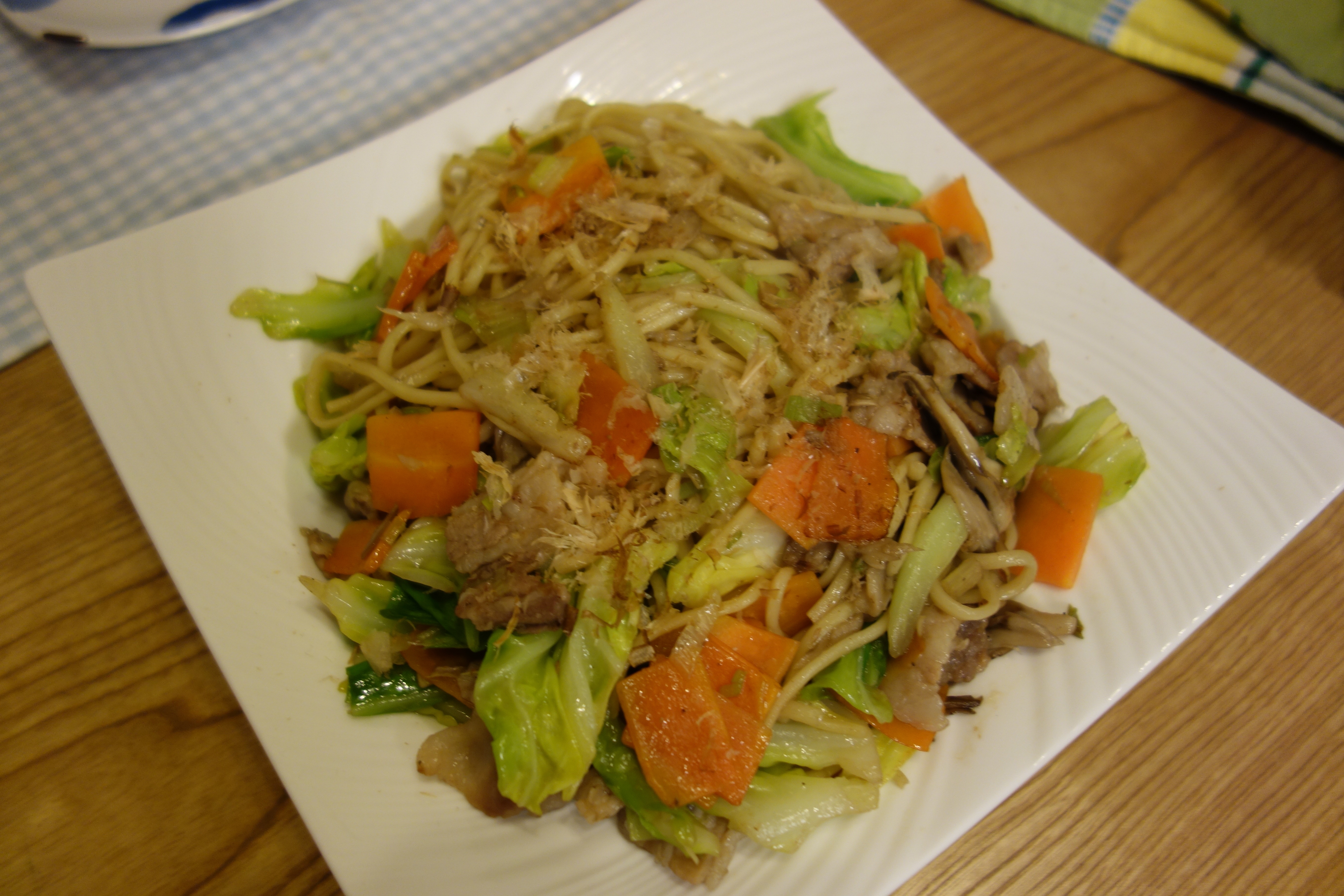
Yakisoba
Commercially packaged otsumami

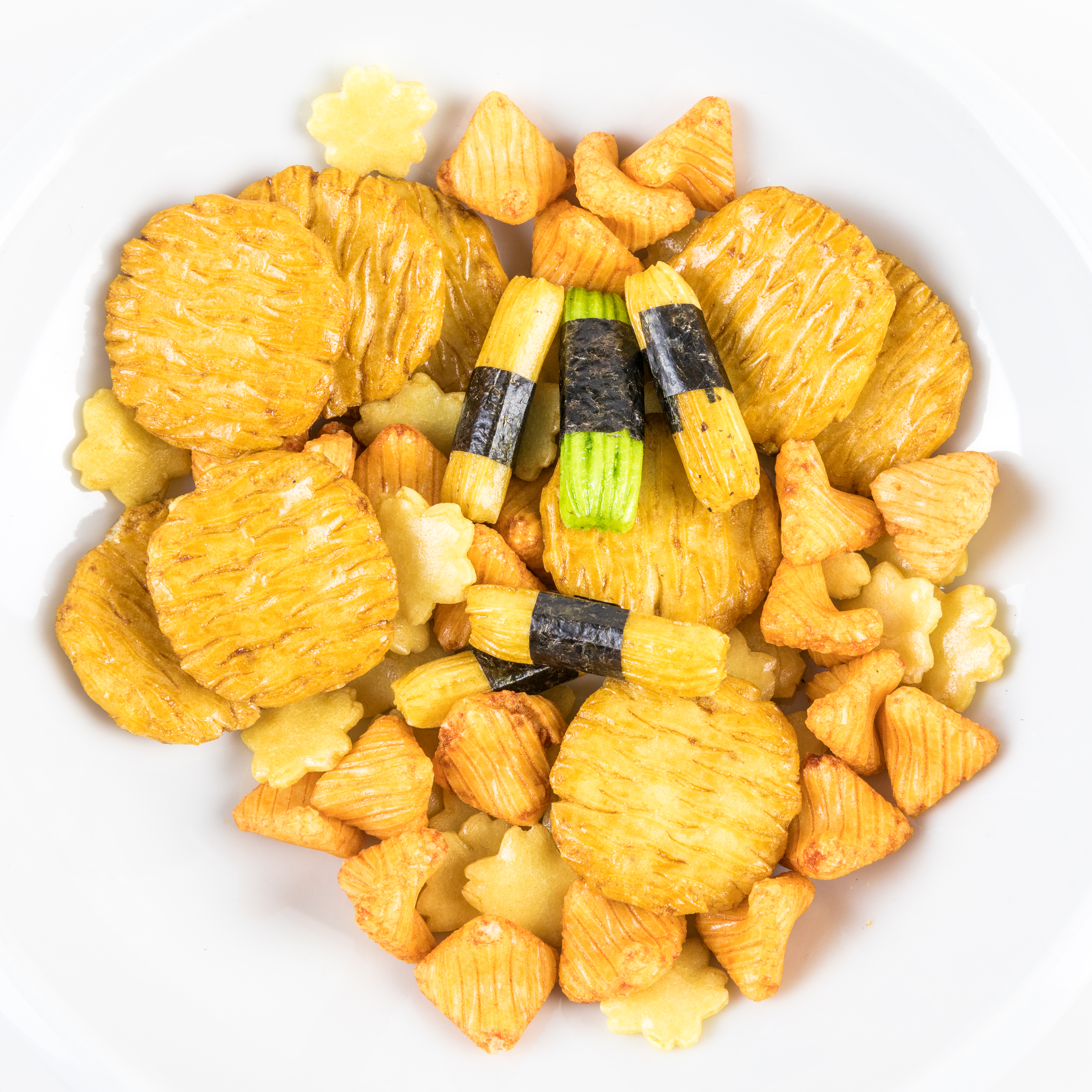
Arare rice crackers

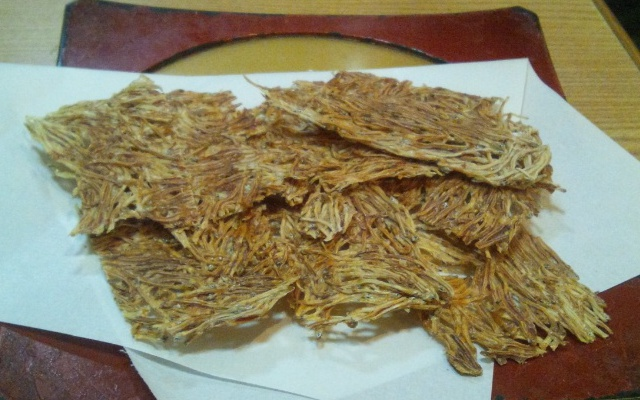
Tatami iwashi

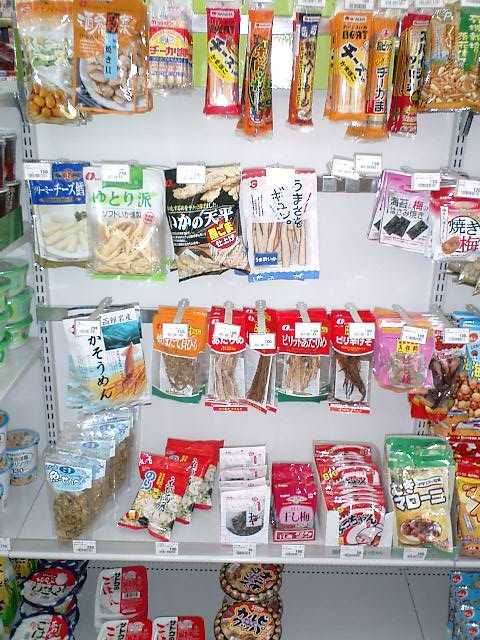
Various otsumami sold at a supermarket

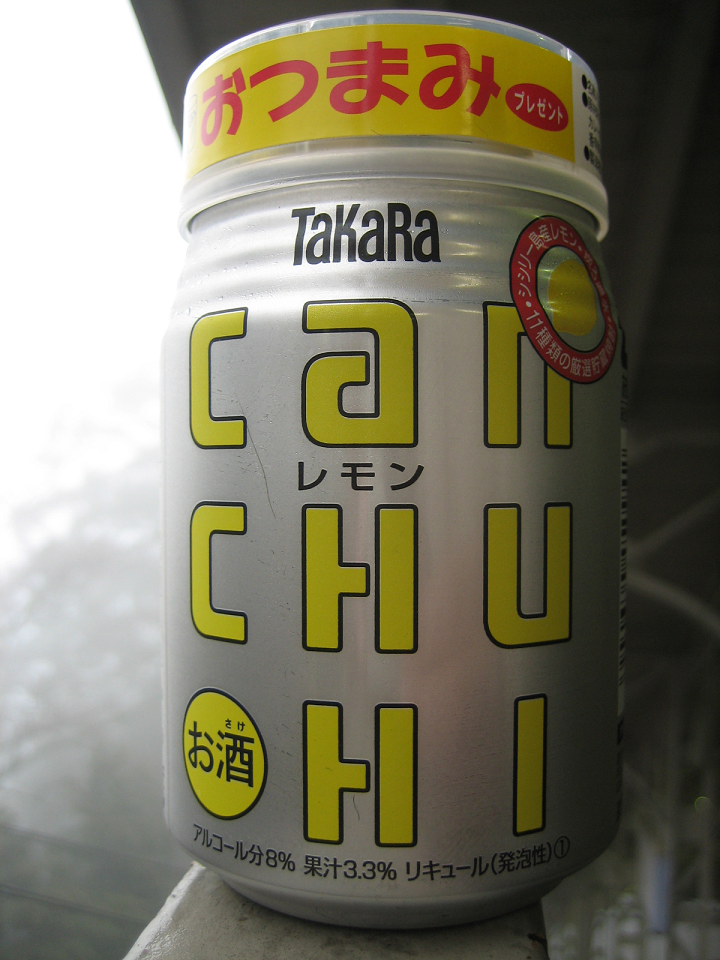
Chu-hi can sold with otsumami attached on the top

== In media ==
Sakana are an everyday part of Japan's drinking culture. Japanese variety shows, magazines, and newspapers frequently feature recipes for homemade sakana.

There are numerous food manga and anime that focus on depicting sakana; some notable examples are:

- Shin'ya Shokudō is a long-running food manga about the sakana the owner of a diner that is only open from midnight to dawn makes for his eccentric patrons. It has been made into a live-action drama. Unlike a standard izakaya, the owner will prepare any food a customer requests if he has the ingredients.
- Takunomi is a four-panel manga and anime focused on drinking at home. Each episode features a different drink, but due to Japanese drinking culture, multiple sakana and otsumami are shown being paired with each drink as alcohol is rarely drunk without a food pairing.
- Wakakozake is a manga and anime focused on the pleasure the main character gets from pairing the perfect sakana with a drink.

== See also ==
- Anju (food) – Korean term for food eaten with alcohol
- Kap klaem – Thai term for food consumed with alcohol
- Meze – Small dish in Middle Eastern and Balkan cuisines
- Pusas – Traditional appetiser or snack eaten with alcohol in Sabah, Malaysia
- Tapas – Appetiser or snack in Spanish and international cuisine
- Zakuski – Russian term for appetizers served before meals
- Snack bar
- Japanese cuisine
