= Thomas Hurst =

Thomas or Tom Hurst may refer to:

- Tom Hurst (footballer) (born 1987), English footballer
- Tom Hurst (politician) (born 1966), member of the Missouri House of Representatives
