= 2004–05 Boston United F.C. season =

Boston United
2004–05 season
- Chairman: Jon Sotnick
- Manager: Steve Evans
- League 2: 16
- FA Cup: Third round
- Football League Cup: Second round
- Top goalscorer: League: All: Andy Kirk (20)
- Highest home attendance: 6445 (v Lincoln)
- Lowest home attendance: 1489 (v Cambridge)
- Average home league attendance: 2965
Home colours	Away colours	Third colours

After their success in Division Three the previous year, Boston were billed as promotion favourites, as they had bolstered their squad for the 2004–05 Football League Two, Boston's third consecutive season in the Football League, after promotion in 2002.

Hectic pre-season matches in a packed schedule saw Boston play a selection of local and national teams, including Rotherham United, Sheffield United, Stamford A.F.C. and local rivals Boston Town. Boston played a very lucrative friendly against a Newcastle United XI at York Street, bringing in a crowd of 3349. The Pilgrims comfortably won 4–0, with Martin Carruthers scoring a hat-trick. The game saw a number of Newcastle's future players at the game, including Michael Chopra, Matty Pattison and goalkeeper Tony Caig.

A notable addition to the Pilgrims' squad was former England international Paul Gascoigne, who joined the club on a short-term basis, as a player-coach. Assigned his famous number 19 shirt for the forthcoming season, Gascoigne was presented in front of the media against his former club Newcastle, a game which he started. Gascoigne went on to make 10 appearances for Boston before leaving in October.

This season for Boston was also notable for their progression in the Carling Cup. Playing Championship side Luton Town was at first a daunting task for United, but they were in form following two consecutive league wins against Chester and Cambridge. The Pilgrims overcame Luton, winning 4–3, setting up a tie with Premier League club Fulham. 5373 people attended the second round tie at York Street, but Boston lost 4–1 at the hands of Chris Coleman's men. Playing for Fulham were many international players, such as Luis Boa Morte, Steed Malbranque, Brian McBride and Tomasz Radzinski.

It was a season of mixed results, with the team only winning 14 of a possible 46 league games. This saw Boston finish in a comfortable 16th position, but this was disappointing to the fans, considering what many had predicted in August.

== End Of Season Squad ==
Note: Flags indicate national team as defined under FIFA eligibility rules; some limited exceptions apply. Players may hold more than one non-FIFA nationality.

No.	Pos.	Nation	Player
2	DF	ENG	Alan White
4	DF	ENG	Paul Ellender (captain)
5	DF	ENG	Mark Greaves (vice-captain)
6	MF	ENG	Steve Melton
7	MF	ENG	Brad Maylett
8	MF	ENG	David Noble
9	FW	ENG	Jason Lee
11	MF	ENG	Chris Holland
12	MF	SCO	Simon Rusk
14	DF	SCO	Austin McCann
15	MF	ENG	Lee Thompson
16	MF	ENG	Danny Thomas

No.	Pos.	Nation	Player
17	FW	WAL	Jermaine Easter
19	FW	SCO	Stephen O'Donnell
20	MF	ENG	Paul Raynor (assistant-manager)
22	MF	ENG	David Staff
23	MF	ENG	Courtney Pitt
24	MF	ENG	Luke Forbes
25	MF	ENG	Rob Norris
26	GK	ENG	Nathan Abbey
27	MF	ENG	Tom Hurst
28	DF	ENG	Dean West
29	FW	ENG	Daryl Clare
31	DF	ENG	Stuart Smith

== Left the club ==
Note: Flags indicate national team as defined under FIFA eligibility rules; some limited exceptions apply. Players may hold more than one non-FIFA nationality.

No.	Pos.	Nation	Player
1	GK	ENG	Paul Bastock (to Scarborough)
2	DF	WAL	Lee Beevers (to Lincoln)
3	DF	ENG	Greg Strong (to Livingston)
3	DF	ENG	Dominic Roma (end of loan from Sheffield Utd)
7	MF	ENG	Tom Bennett (to Kidderminster)
7	FW	ENG	Kevin James (end of loan from Nottingham Forest)
7	MF	ENG	Scott Wiseman (end of loan from Hull City)
10	FW	NIR	Andy Kirk (to Northampton)
17	MF	ENG	Ryan Clarke (to Leigh RMI)
18	FW	ENG	Martin Carruthers (to Lincoln)
18	MF	SCO	Stephen Boyack (to Blackpool)
18	GK	ENG	Luke McCormick (end of loan from Plymouth)
19	MF	ENG	Paul Gascoigne (left the club)
21	MF	ENG	Matt O'Halloran (to King's Lynn)
24	DF	ENG	Gareth Jelleyman (end of loan from Peterborough)
24	DF	ITA	Emanule Gabrieli (end of loan from Sheffield Utd)
25	FW	ENG	Zema Abbey (end of loan from Norwich)
27	FW	SCO	Tam McManus (end of loan from Hibernian)
