= Bruce Sassmann =

American politician

Member of the Missouri House of Representatives from the 61st district
- In office January 6, 2021 – 2023
- Preceded by: Tom Hurst
- Succeeded by: Sherri Gallick

Member of the Missouri House of Representatives from the 62nd district
- Incumbent
- Assumed office 2023

Personal details
- Born: August 11, 1950 (age 75) Washington, Missouri, U.S.
- Party: Republican
- Education: Missouri State University (BS); St. Louis Community College–Forest Park (AS)

Bruce Sassmann (born August 11, 1950) is an American politician and businessman serving as a member of the Missouri House of Representatives from the 62nd district. Elected in November 2020, he assumed office on January 6, 2021. Redistricting in 2022 placed his home in the new 61st district, so he ran for re-election there.

== Early life and education ==
Sassmann was born in Washington, Missouri in 1950. After graduating from Bland High School in 1968, he earned a Bachelor of Science degree in education from Missouri State University and an Associate of Science in funeral service from St. Louis Community College–Forest Park.

== Career ==
Sassmann operates his family's funeral businesses and is a landlord.

=== Missouri House of Representatives ===
Sassmann was elected to the Missouri House of Representatives in November 2020 and assumed office on January 6, 2021.

In 2025, Sassmann passed legislation to ban the sale of certain invasive species in Missouri nurseries: climbing euonymus, Japanese honeysuckle, lespedeza cuneata, perilla mint, burning bush and Callery pear.

== Electoral history ==
Missouri House of Representatives Primary Election, August 4, 2020, District 62
Party	Candidate	Votes	%	±%
Republican	Bruce Sassmann	3,161	40.56%	
Republican	Tom Reed	2,708	34.75%	
Republican	Chris Beyer	1,924	24.69%	
Total votes		7,793	100.00%	

Missouri House of Representatives Election, November 3, 2020, District 62
Party	Candidate	Votes	%	±%
Republican	Bruce Sassmann	14,429	79.58%	
Democratic	Nancy J. Ragan	3,703	20.42%	
Total votes		18,132	100.00%	

Missouri House of Representatives Election, November 8, 2022, District 61
Party	Candidate	Votes	%	±%
Republican	Bruce Sassmann	12,874	100.00%	+20.42
Total votes		12,874	100.00%	
