= Ume suishō =

Japanese shark cartilage dish

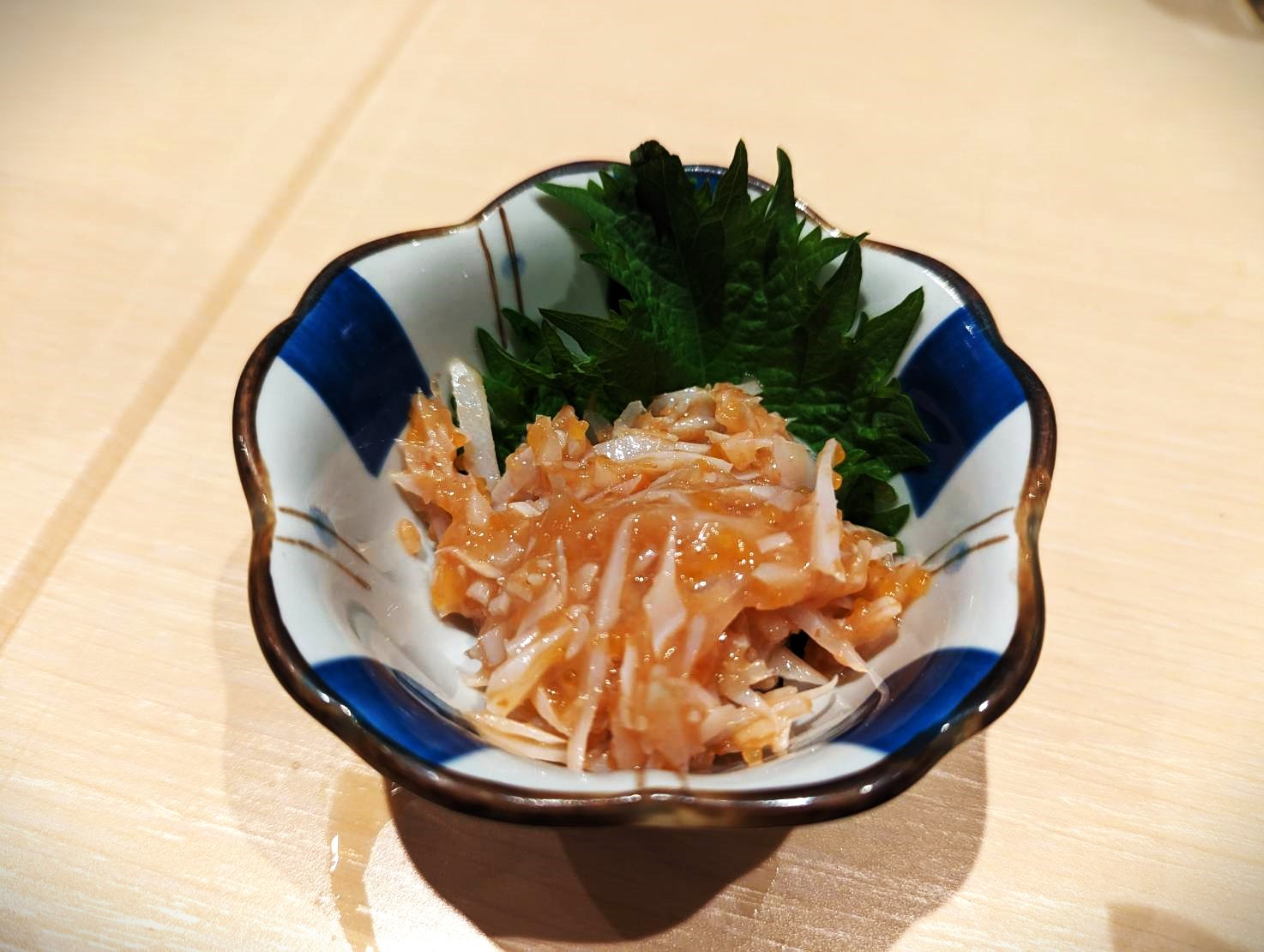
Ume suishō, a Japanese drinking snack made from finely chopped shark cartilage dressed with pickled plum paste. It is commonly served at izakaya.

Ume suishō is a Japanese delicacy commonly served as a sakana (drinking snack). It is prepared by finely chopping shark cartilage and dressing it with pickled plum paste, resulting in a distinctive crunchy texture and sour flavor.

The dish is popular as an accompaniment to sake and shōchū, and is frequently served in small portions at izakaya (Japanese-style pubs). It is often garnished with ingredients such as shiso leaves or cucumber, and is sometimes used as a filling for hosomaki or other forms of sushi.

== See also ==
- Sakana
