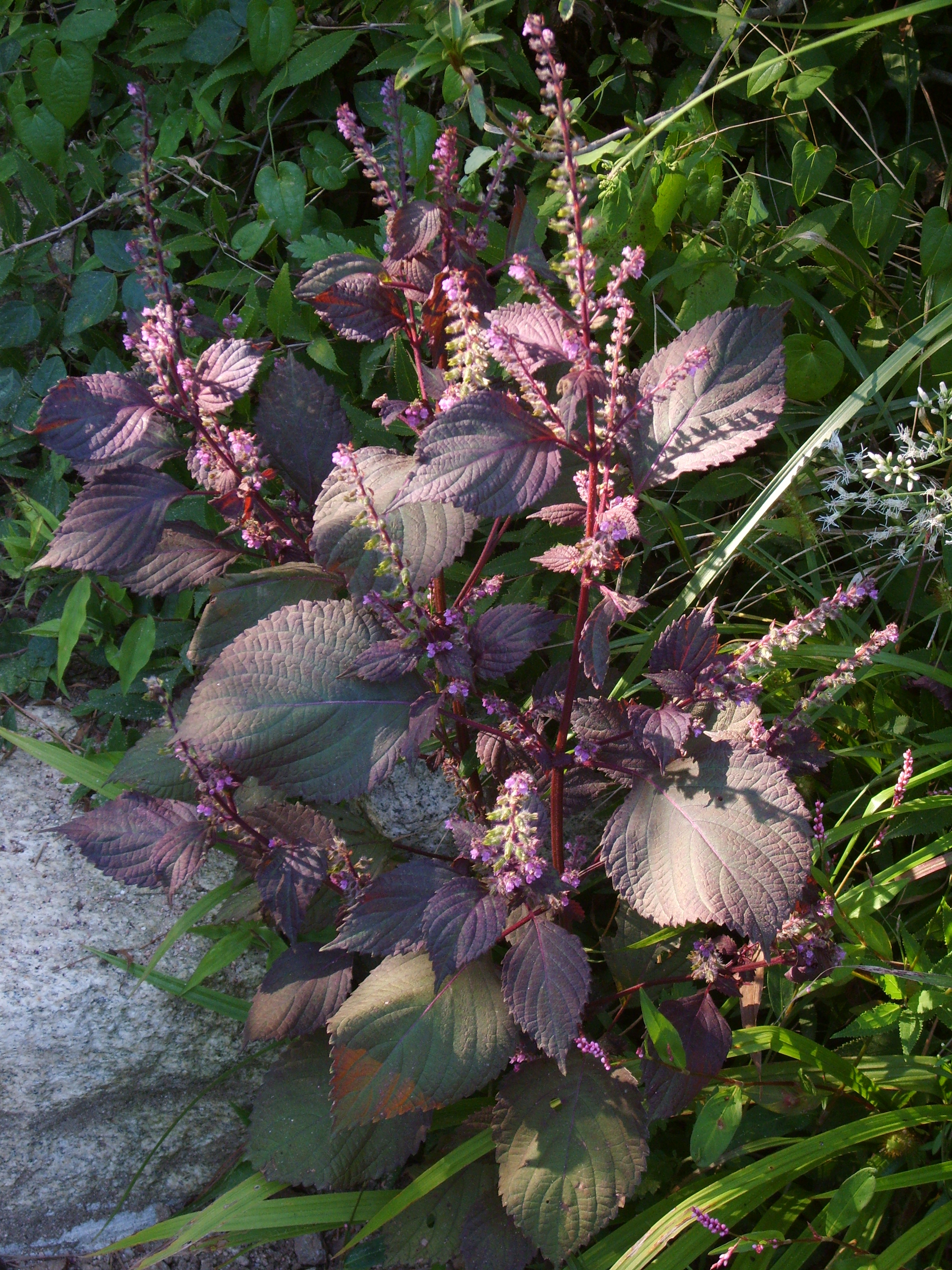
- Red shiso

Scientific classification
- Kingdom: Plantae
- Clade: Tracheophytes
- Clade: Angiosperms
- Clade: Eudicots
- Clade: Asterids
- Order: Lamiales
- Family: Lamiaceae
- Genus: Perilla
- Species: P. frutescens
- Variety: P. f. var. crispa

Trinomial name
- Perilla frutescens var. crispa (Thunb.) H.Deane

Synonyms
- Dentidia nankinensis Lour.; Dentidia purpurascens Pers.; Dentidia purpurea Poir.; Ocimum acutum Thunb.; Ocimum crispum Thunb.; Perilla acuta (Thunb.) Nakai; Perilla arguta Benth.; Perilla crispa (Thunb.) Tanaka; Perilla frutescens var. acuta (Thunb.) Kudô; Perilla frutescens var. arguta (Benth.) Hand.-Mazz.; Perilla frutescens f. crispa (Thunb.) Makino; Perilla frutescens var. crispa (Benth.) Deane ex Bailey; Perilla frutescens var. nankinensis (Lour.) Britton; Perilla nankinensis (Lour.) Decne.; Perilla ocymoides var. crispa (Thunb.) Benth.

= Shiso =

Variety of plant in the mint family

Perilla frutescens var. crispa, also known by its Japanese name shiso (紫蘇) from Chinese zisu, is a cultigen of Perilla frutescens, a herb in the mint family Lamiaceae. It is native to the mountainous regions of China and India, but is now found worldwide. The plant occurs in several forms, as defined by the characteristics of their leaves, including red, green, bicolor, and ruffled. Shiso is perennial and may be cultivated as an annual in temperate climates. Different parts of the plant are used in East Asian and Southeast Asian cuisine.

== Names ==
The herb is known in Chinese as zǐsū (紫蘇 "purple perilla"), which is the origin of the Japanese name shiso (紫蘇/シソ) and the Vietnamese name tía tô. It is also called huíhuísū (回回蘇 "Muslim perilla") in Chinese. In Korean, it is known as soyeop (소엽) or chajogi (차조기). In ancient Japan, it was called inue ("pseudo-perilla"), though this name is no longer used.

In English, it is sometimes called the "beefsteak plant", because purple-leaf varieties resemble the blood-red color of meat. Other common names include "perilla mint", "Chinese basil", and "wild basil". The alias "wild coleus" or "summer coleus" probably describes ornamental varieties. Red-leaf varieties are sometimes called "purple mint". In the Ozarks, it is called "rattlesnake weed", because the sound the dried stalks make when disturbed along a footpath is similar to a rattlesnake's rattle. The Japanese name shiso became part of the English lexicon in the 1990s, owing to the growing popularity of sushi.

The plant is sometimes referred to by its genus name, Perilla, but this is ambiguous as perilla could also refer to a different cultigen (Perilla frutescens var. frutescens). To avoid confusion, Perilla frutescens var. frutescens is called egoma ("perilla sesame") in Japan and deulkkae ("wild sesame") in Korea.

When red-leaf shiso was introduced into the West in the 1850s, it was given the scientific name Perilla nankinensis, after the city of Nanking. This name is now less common than Perilla frutescens.

== Origins and distribution ==
It is suggested that the native origins of the plant are mountainous regions of India and China, although other sources point to Southeast Asia.

== History ==
Perilla frutescens was cultivated in ancient China. One of the early mentions comes from the Supplementary Records of Renowned Physicians (名醫別錄 Míng Yī Bié Lù), written around 500 AD, where it is listed as su (蘇), and some of its uses are described. The plant was introduced into Japan around the eighth to ninth centuries.

Red shiso became available to gardening enthusiasts in England around 1855. By 1862, the English were reporting overuse of this plant, and proposing Coleus vershaeffeltii or Amaranthus melancholicus var. ruber made available by J.G. Veitch as an alternative. It was introduced later in the United States, perhaps in the 1860s. Today, it is considered a weed or invasive species.

== Description ==
Shiso grows to 40–100 centimetres (16–39 in) tall. It has broad ovate leaves with pointy ends and serrated margins, arranged oppositely with long leafstalks. Shiso seeds are about 1 mm in size, and are smaller and harder compared to other perilla varieties. Seeds weigh about 1.5 g per 1000 seeds. The plants are not frost hardy. In USDA zones 11 and above, they grow as perennials.

=== Varieties ===
Several forms of shiso exist. They are defined by the color and morphology of the leaves, though coloring is also found on the stalk and flower buds. Redness in shiso is caused by shisonin, an anthocyanin pigment found in perilla. Ruffled red shiso was the first form examined by Western botanists, and Carl Peter Thunberg named it P. crispa (meaning "wavy" or "curly"). That Latin name crispa was later retained when shiso was reclassified as a cultigen.

Red shiso (f. purpurea)
Leaves red on both sides, flat surface. Often called simply "shiso".
Ruffled red shiso (f. crispa)
Leaves red on both sides, ruffled surface.
Green shiso (f. viridis)
Leaves green on both sides, flat surface.
Ruffled green shiso (f. viridi-crispa)
Leaves green on both sides, ruffled surface. Cultivar.
Bicolor shiso (f. discolor)
Leaves green on top side, red on back side, flat surface. Cultivar.
Variegated shiso (f. rosea)
Leaves a mix of green and red on both sides, flat surface.

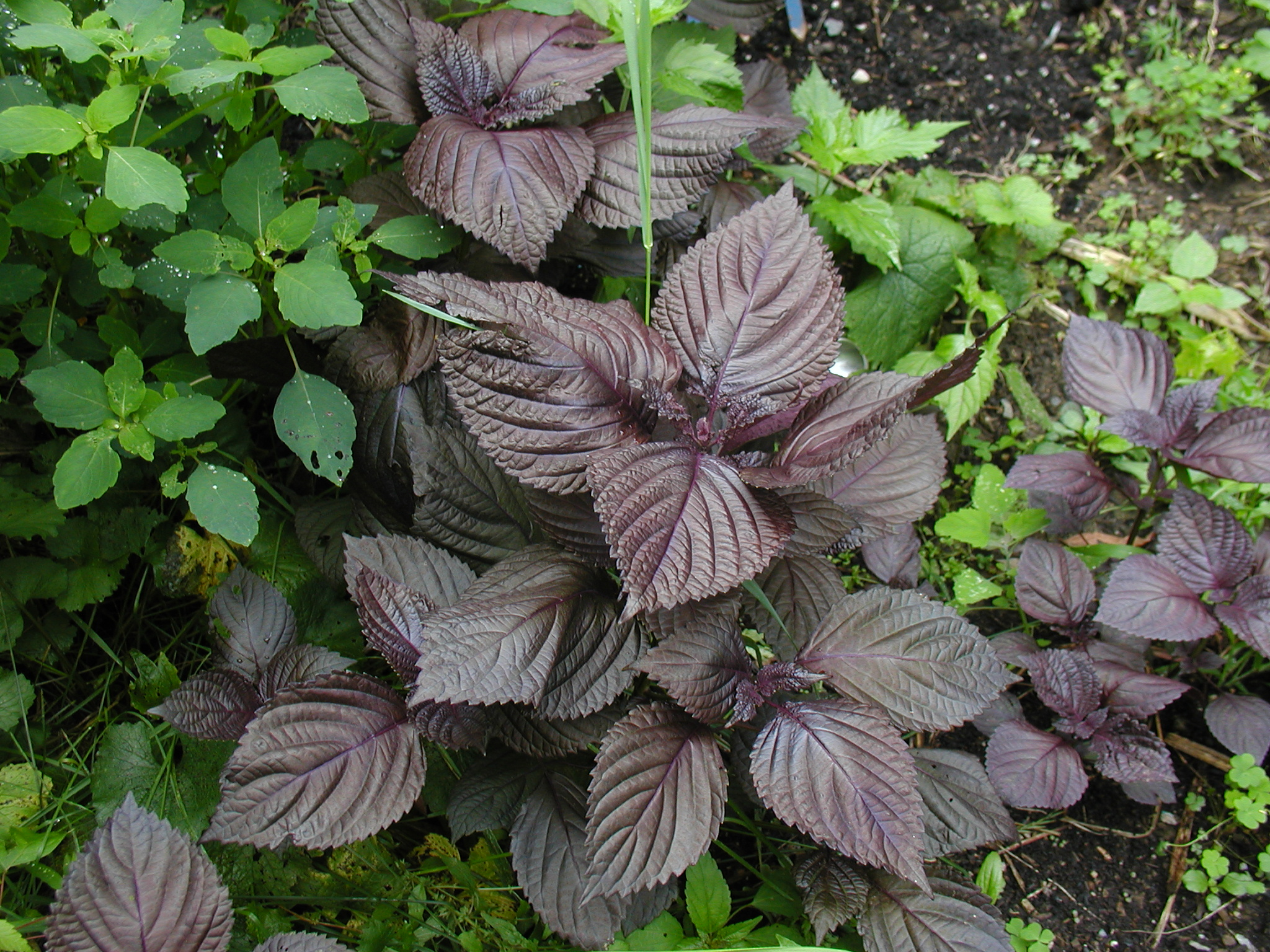
Red shiso growing in the wild

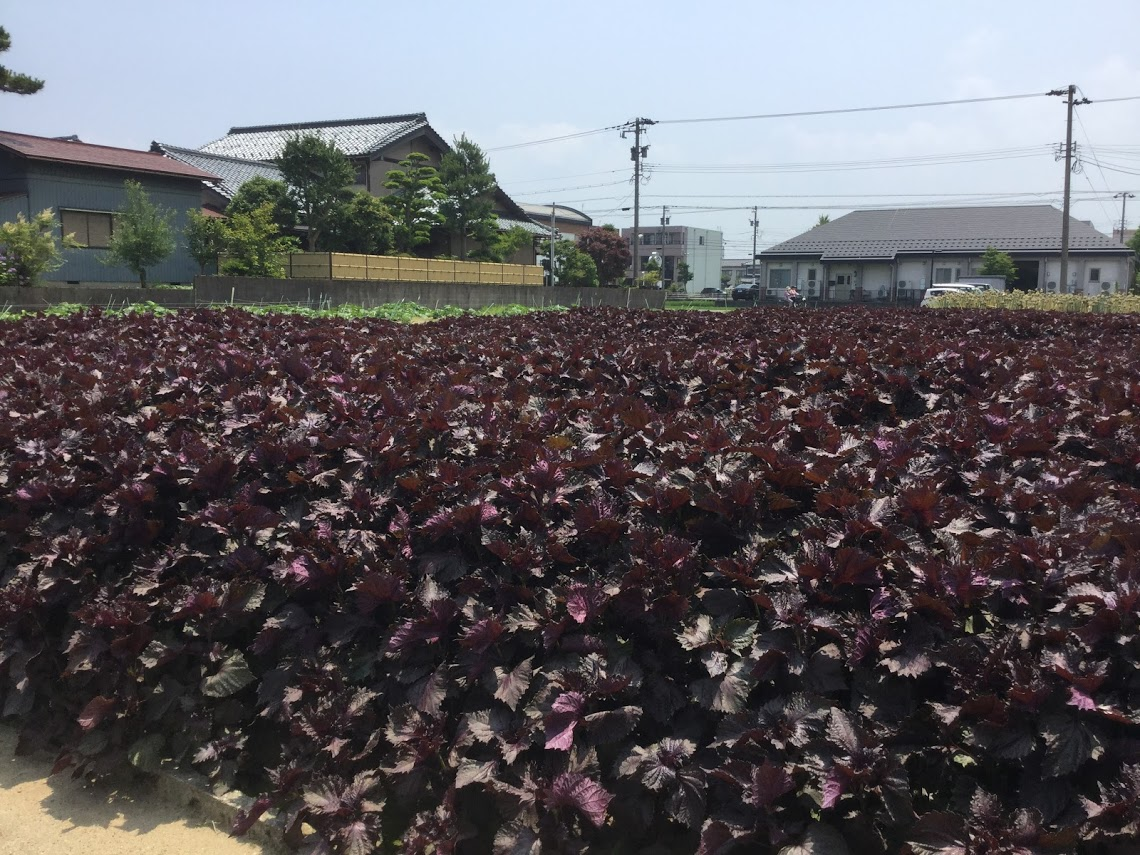
Red shiso field in Fukui City, Japan

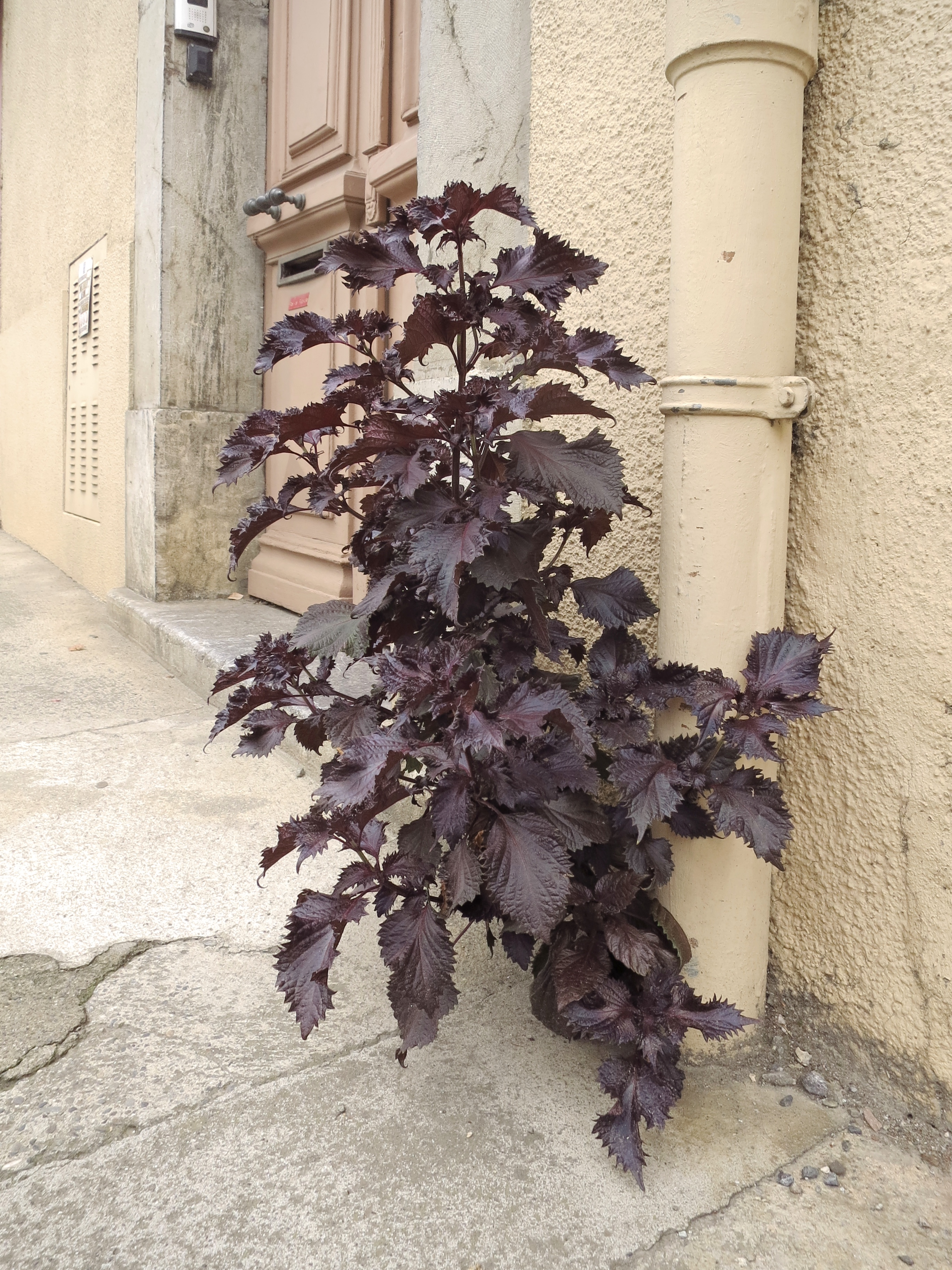
Red shiso in Saint-Girons, France

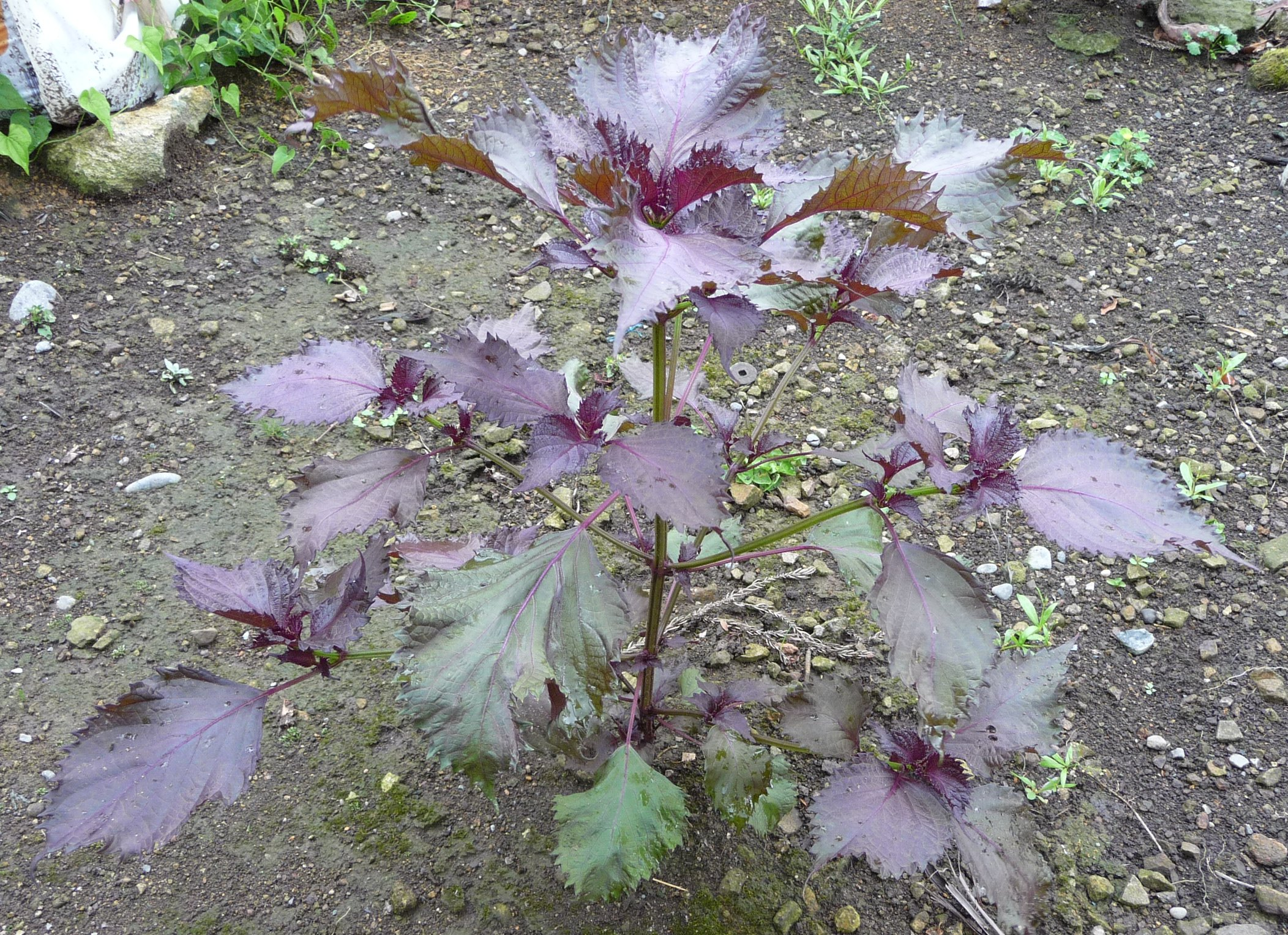
Red Shiso, used to color Umeboshi red, in Kaga, Ishikawa Japan

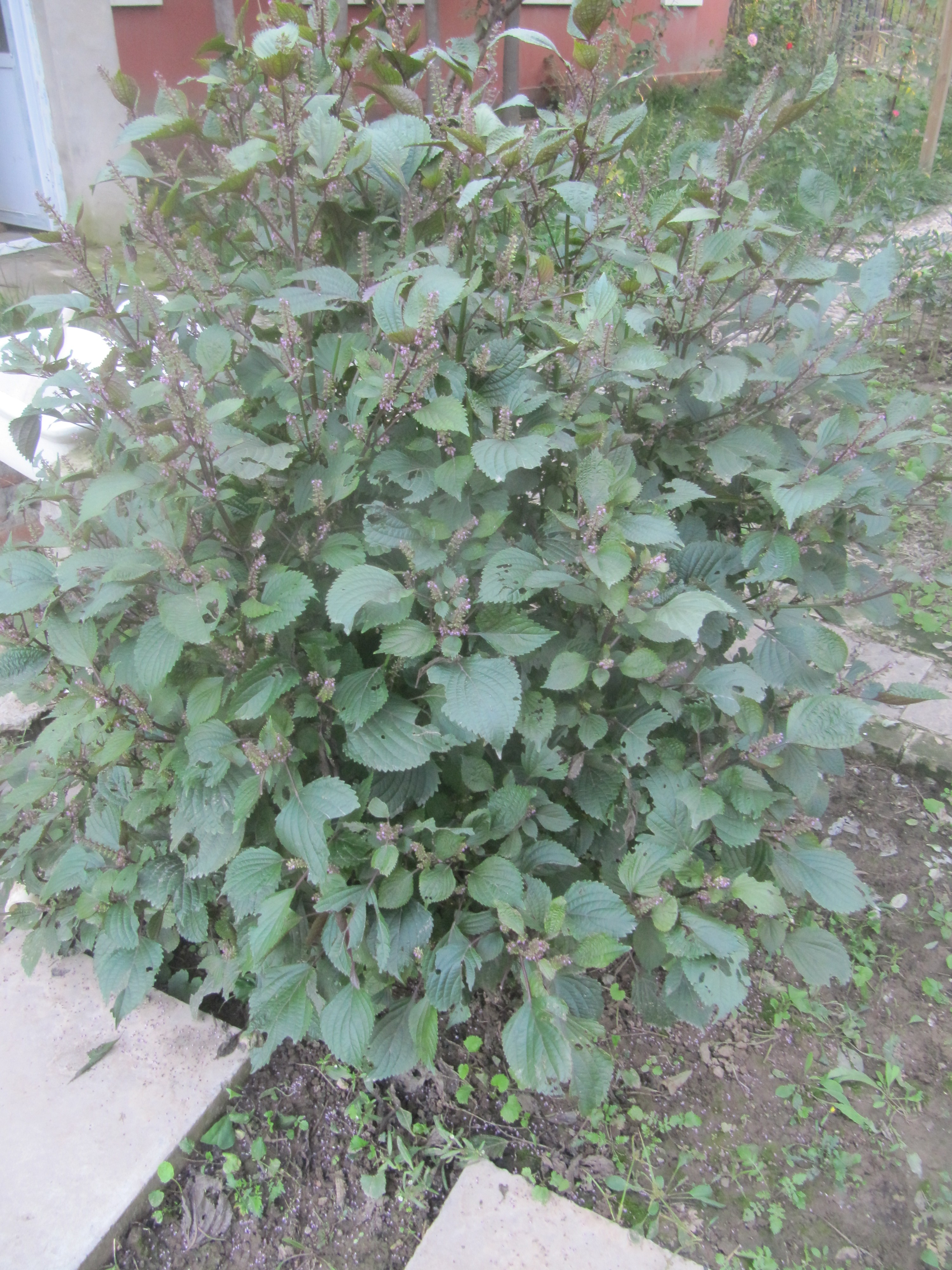
Green shiso in Beijing, China

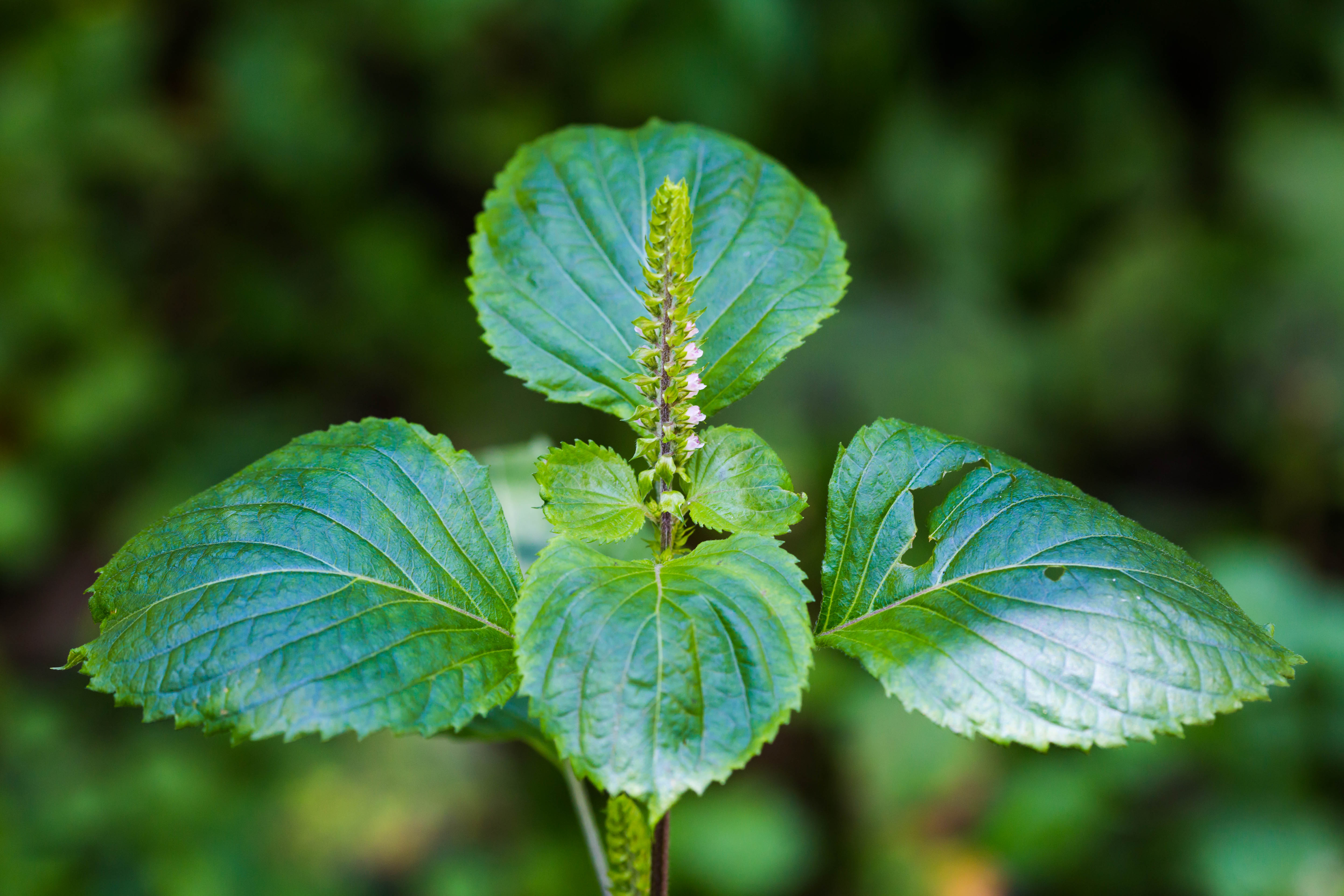
Green shiso flower

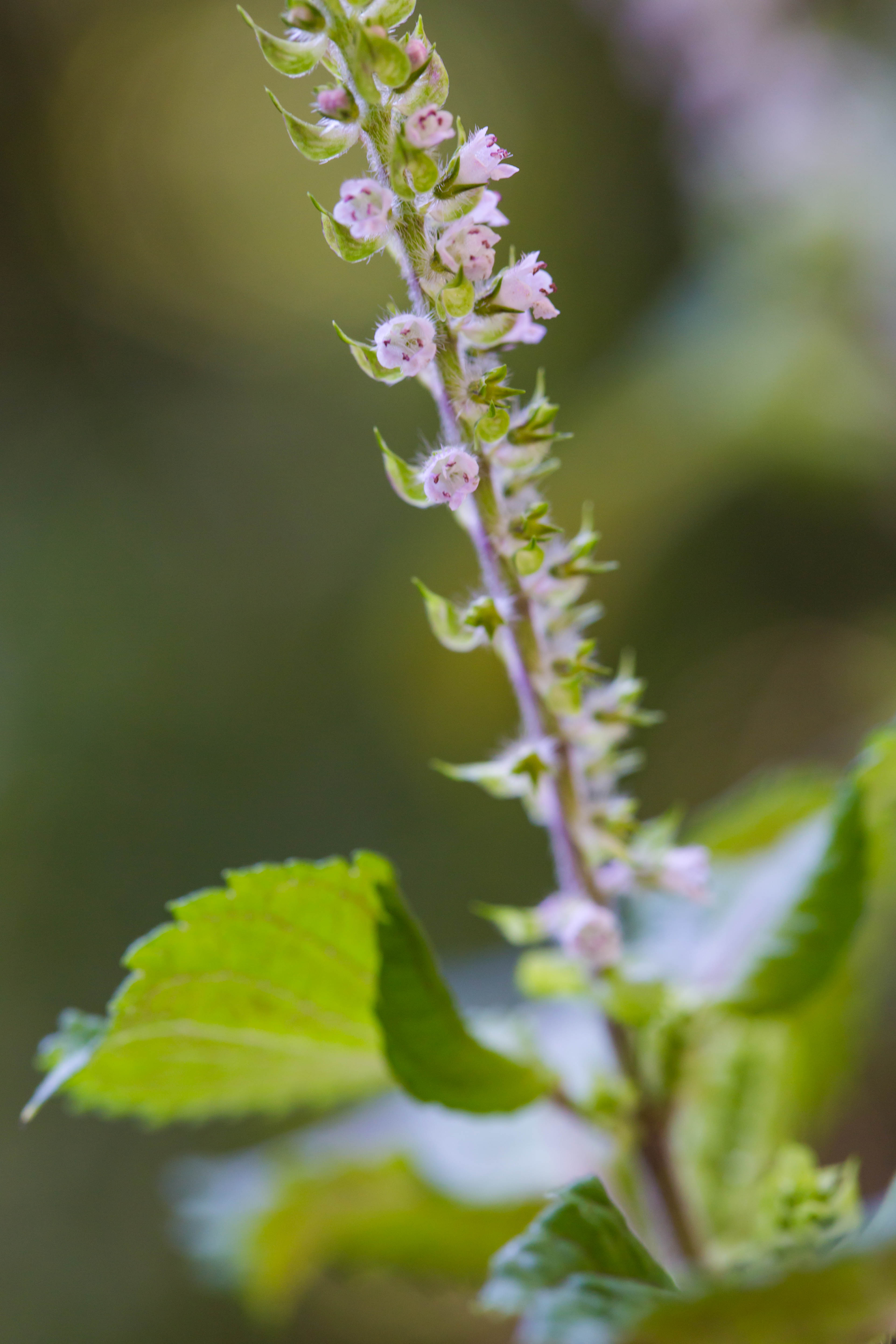
Green shiso flower

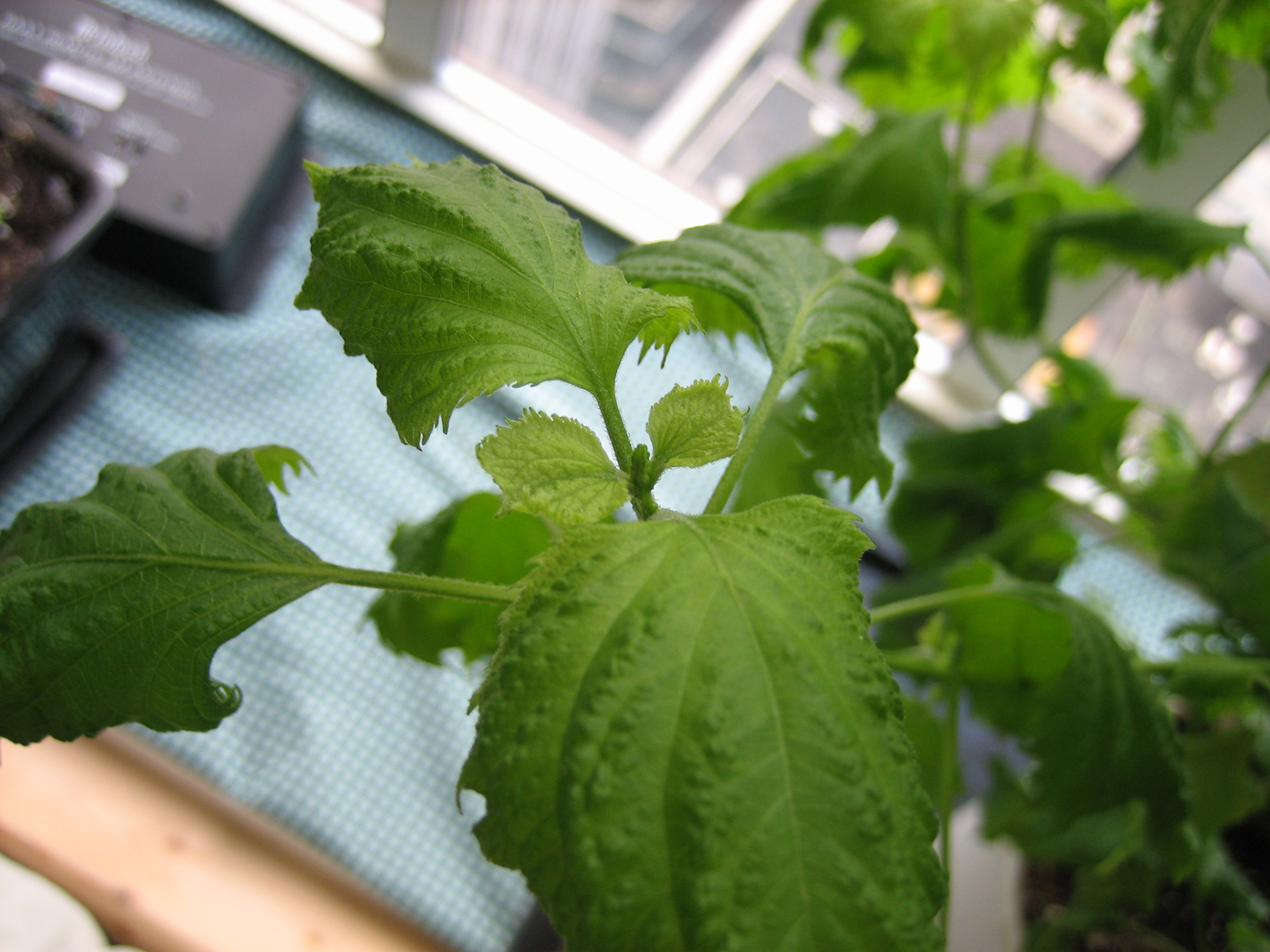
Green shiso as a potted plant

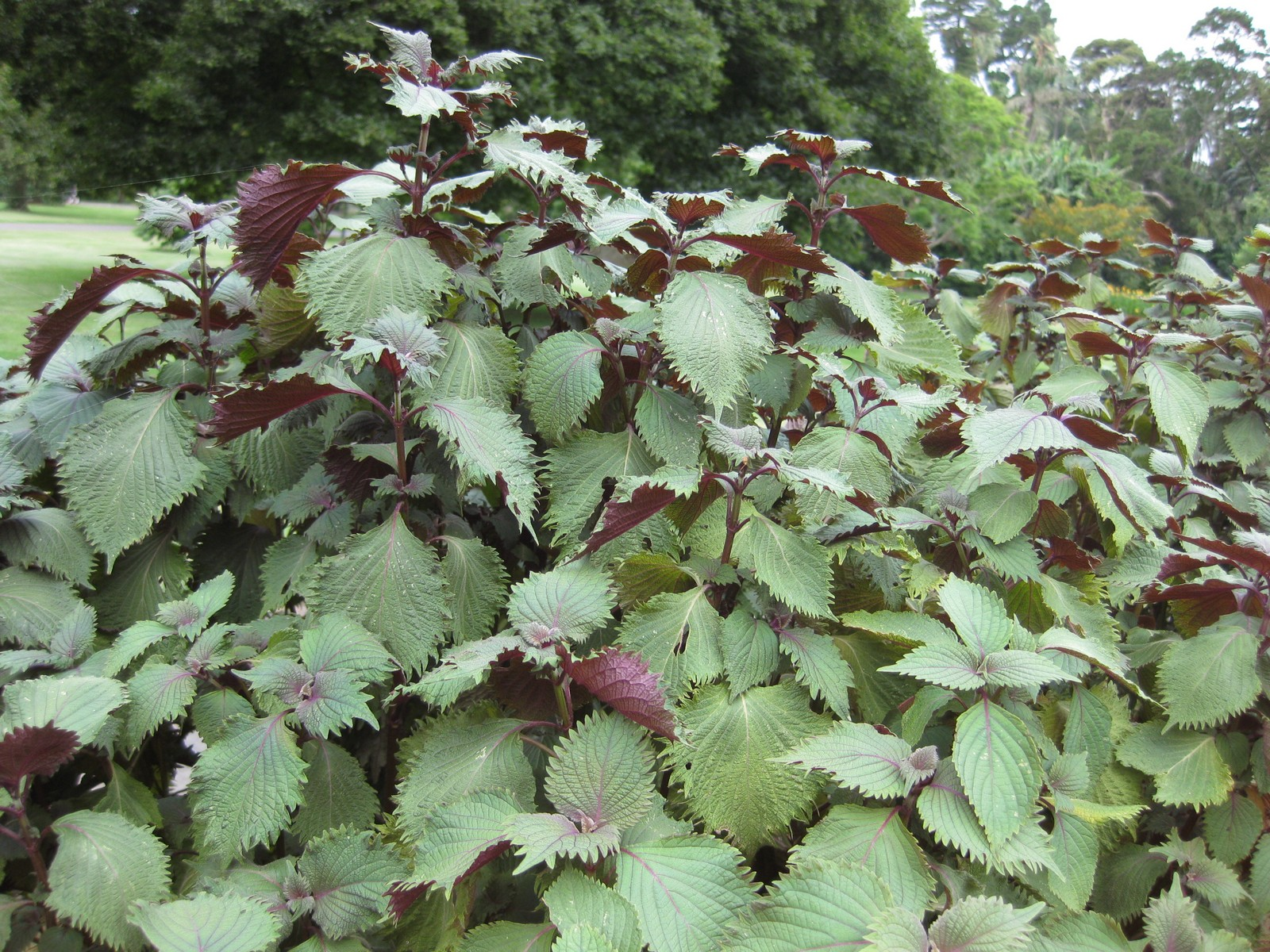
Bicolor shiso in the Royal Botanic Garden, Sydney, Australia

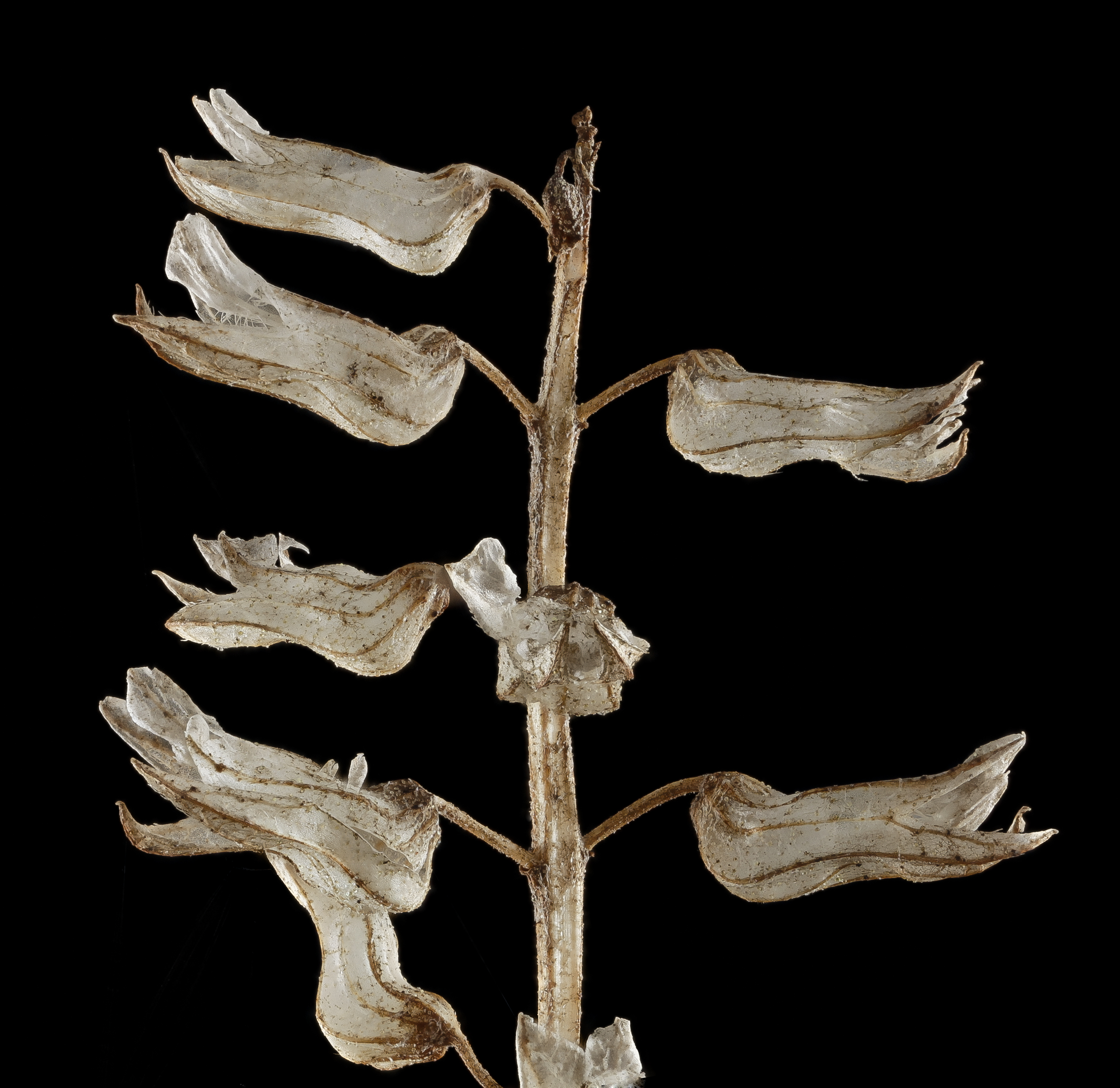
Shiso seed pods

== Culinary use ==
Cultivated shiso is eaten in many East and Southeast Asian countries. Wild, weedy shiso are not suitable for eating, as they do not have the characteristic shiso fragrance, and are high in perilla ketone, which is potentially toxic.

=== East Asia ===
==== China ====
Chinese cuisine also utilizes shiso, named zi su (紫苏), bai su (白苏), or huihui su (回回苏) in Chinese. It is sometimes used as a decorative ingredient, and is sometimes eaten to reduce grease (as with barbecue). It is common practice to accompany fish and crab dishes with zisu, as it is thought that zisu leaves can offset the toxins in seafood.

==== Japan ====
Japanese names for shiso types
Red shiso (f. purpurea)	Shiso (紫蘇)
Red shiso (f. purpurea)	Akajiso (赤紫蘇)
Ruffled red shiso (f. crispa)	Chirimen-jiso (縮緬紫蘇)
Green shiso (f. viridis)	Aojiso (青紫蘇)
Green shiso (f. viridis)	Ōba (大葉)
Ruffled green shiso (f. viridi-crispa)	Chirimen-aojiso (縮緬青紫蘇)
Bicolor shiso (f. discolor)	Katamen-jiso (片面紫蘇)
Variegated shiso (f. rosea)	Madara-jiso (斑紫蘇)

Shiso (紫蘇) is extensively used in Japanese cuisine. Red, green, and bicolor varieties are used for different purposes.

Red shiso is called akajiso (赤紫蘇). It is used in the making of umeboshi (pickled plums) to give the plums a red color. The leaves turn bright red when steeped in umezu, the vinegary brine that results as a byproduct of pickling plums. It can also be combined with umezu to make certain types of sushi. In the summer, it is used to make a sweet, red juice. In Kyoto, red shiso and its seeds are used to make shibazuke, a type of fermented eggplant.

Red leaves are dried and pulverized into flakes, then mixed with salt to make a seasoning called yukari. The word yukari is an ancient term for the color purple, and was first used by Mishima Foods Co. to describe their shiso product, though the word is now used to refer to shiso salt in general. Red shiso leaf flakes are a common ingredient in furikake seasonings, meant to be sprinkled over rice or mixed into onigiri (rice balls).

Green shiso is called aojiso (青紫蘇) or ōba (大葉 "big leaf"). It is used to garnish noodle dishes like hiyamugi or sōmen, meat dishes like sashimi, tataki and namerō, and tofu dishes like hiyayakko. Whitebait (shirasu) sashimi is often garnished with green shiso. Whole leaves are also used as receptacles to hold wasabi, or tsuma (garnishes). Leaves can also be battered on one side and fried to make tempura, and are served with other fried items. Chopped leaves are used to flavor any number of fillings or batter to be cooked, for use in warm dishes. In Japan, pasta is sometimes topped with dried or freshly chopped shiso leaves, which is often combined with raw tarako (pollock roe). Green shiso has even been used in pizza toppings in lieu of basil. In the summer of 2009, Pepsi Japan released a seasonal flavored beverage, the green colored Pepsi Shiso.

Shiso seed pods (fruits) are called shiso no mi, and are salted and preserved like a spice. They can be combined with fine slivers of daikon (radish) to make a simple salad. Oil pressed from the seeds was once used for deep-frying.

Shiso sprouts, buds and cotyledons are all called mejiso (芽紫蘇), and used as garnish. Red sprouts are called murame, and green sprouts are called aome. Although not often served in restaurants, mejiso are used as microgreens.

Shiso flowers are called hojiso (穂紫蘇), and used as garnish for sashimi. They are intended to be scraped off the stalk with chopsticks, and added as flavoring to the soy sauce dip. The flowers can also be pickled.

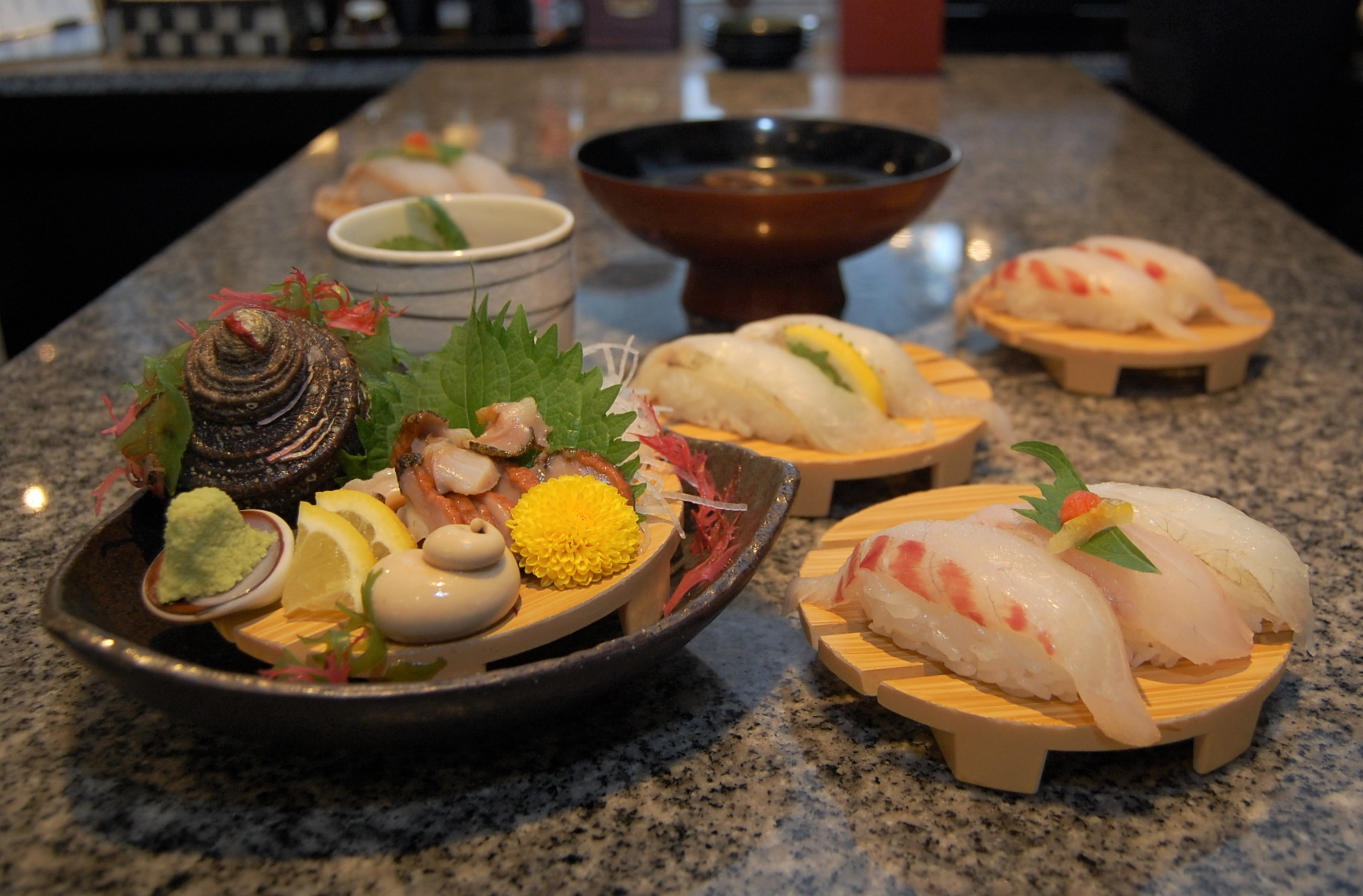
Various types of sushi with green shiso leaves

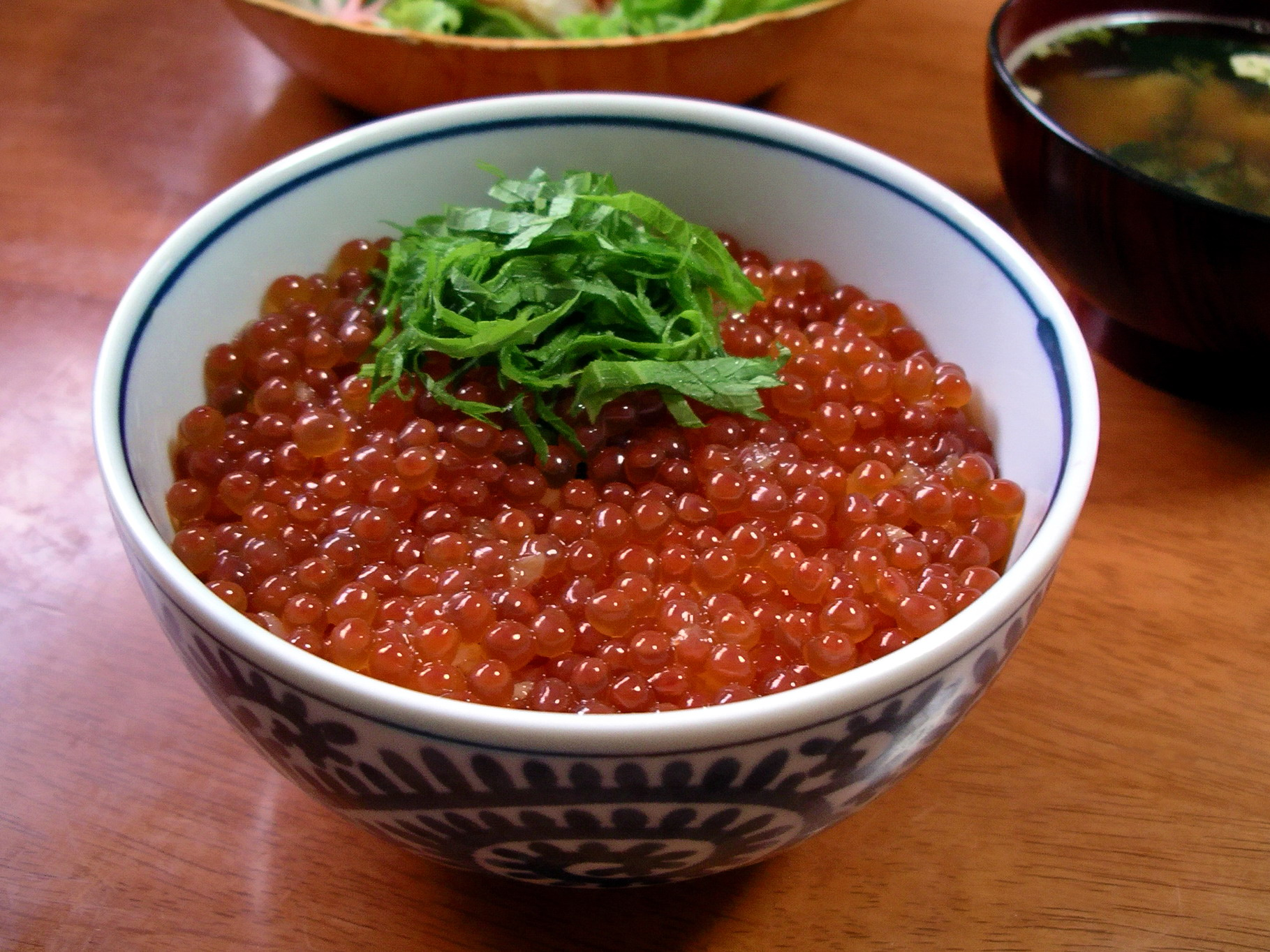
Ikura-don with green shiso garnish

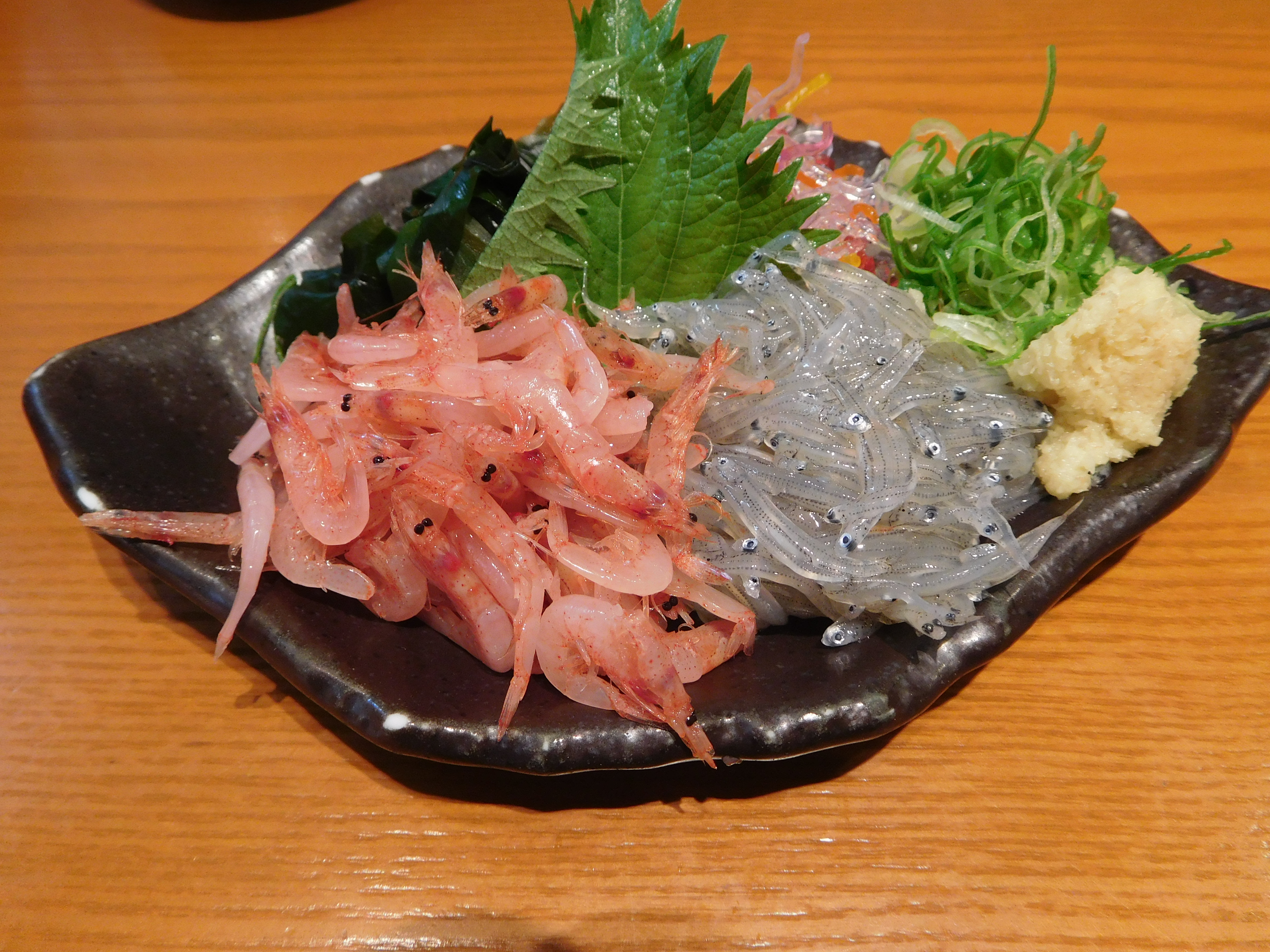
Shrimp and whitebait sashimi with green shiso leaves

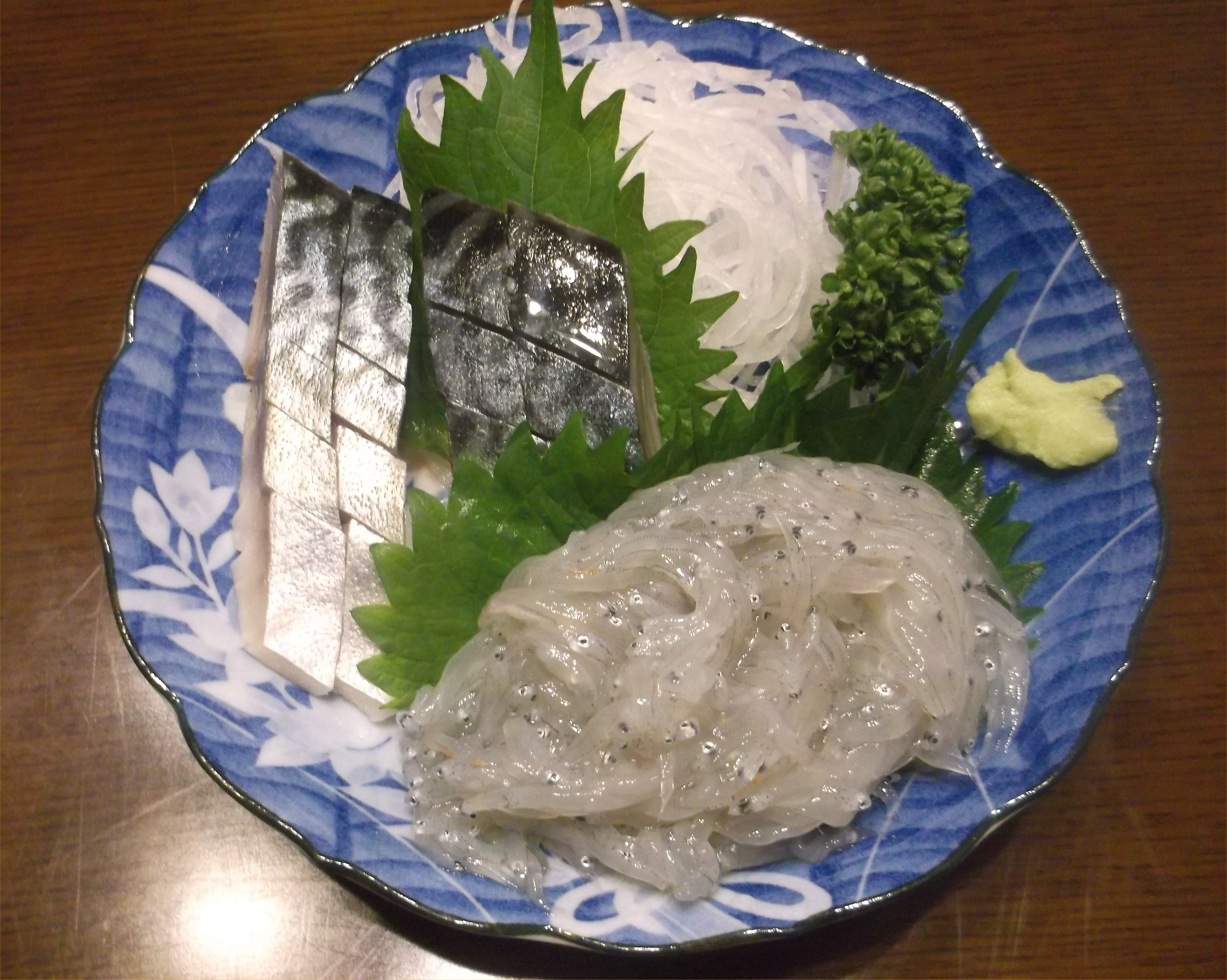
Shimesaba (cured mackerel) and whitebait sashimi with green shiso leaves

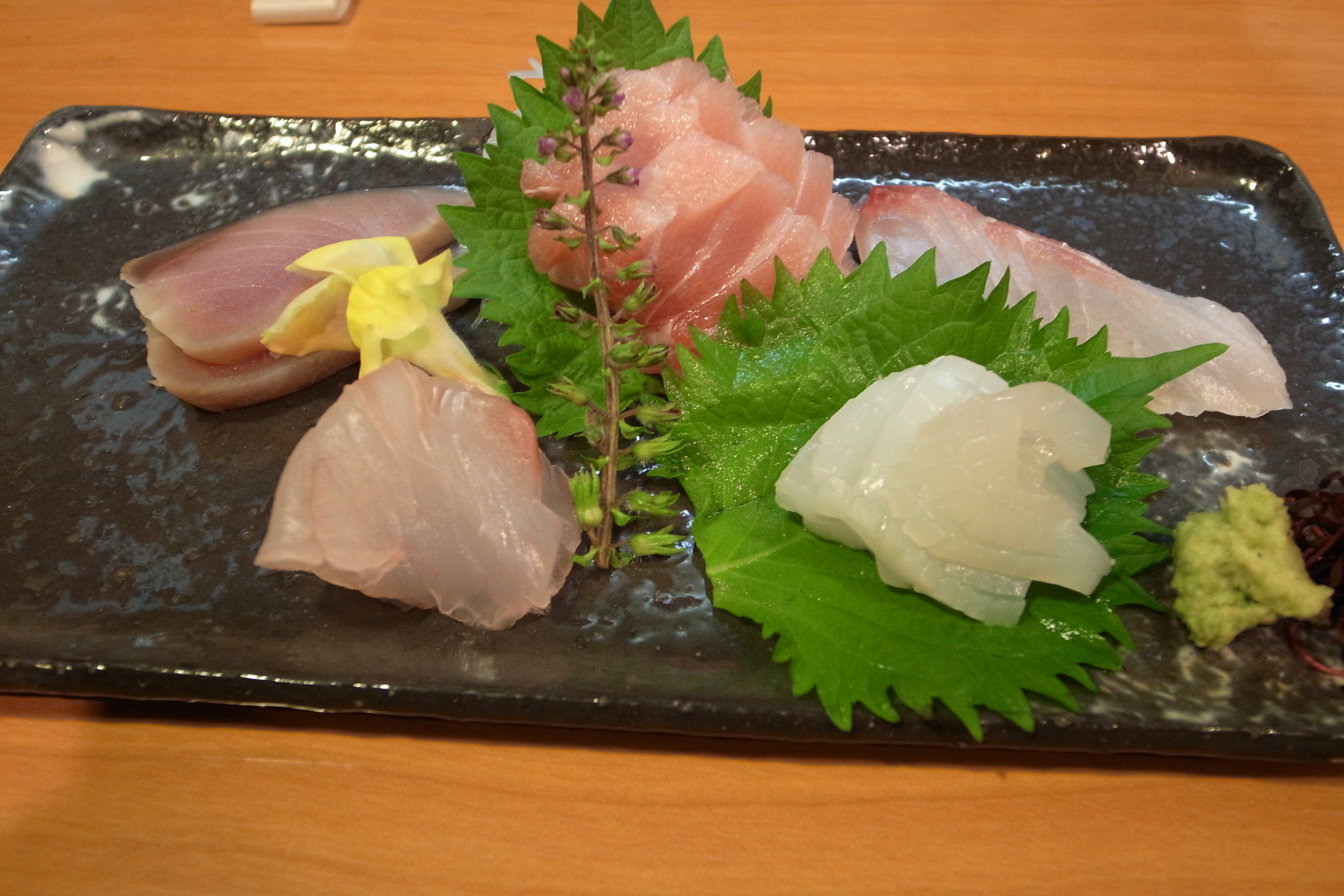
Green shiso leaf used to hold sashimi

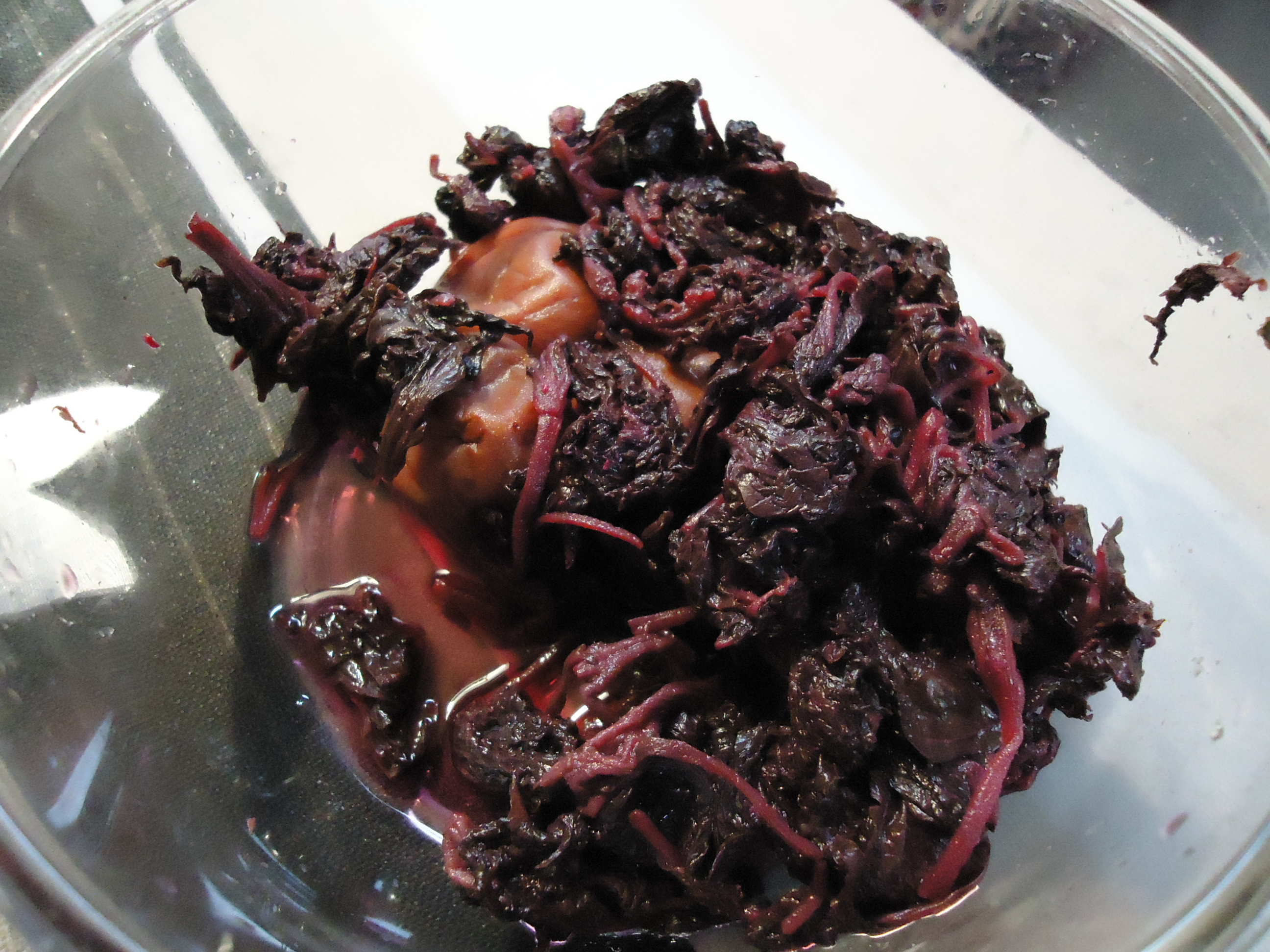
Umeboshi pickled with red shiso

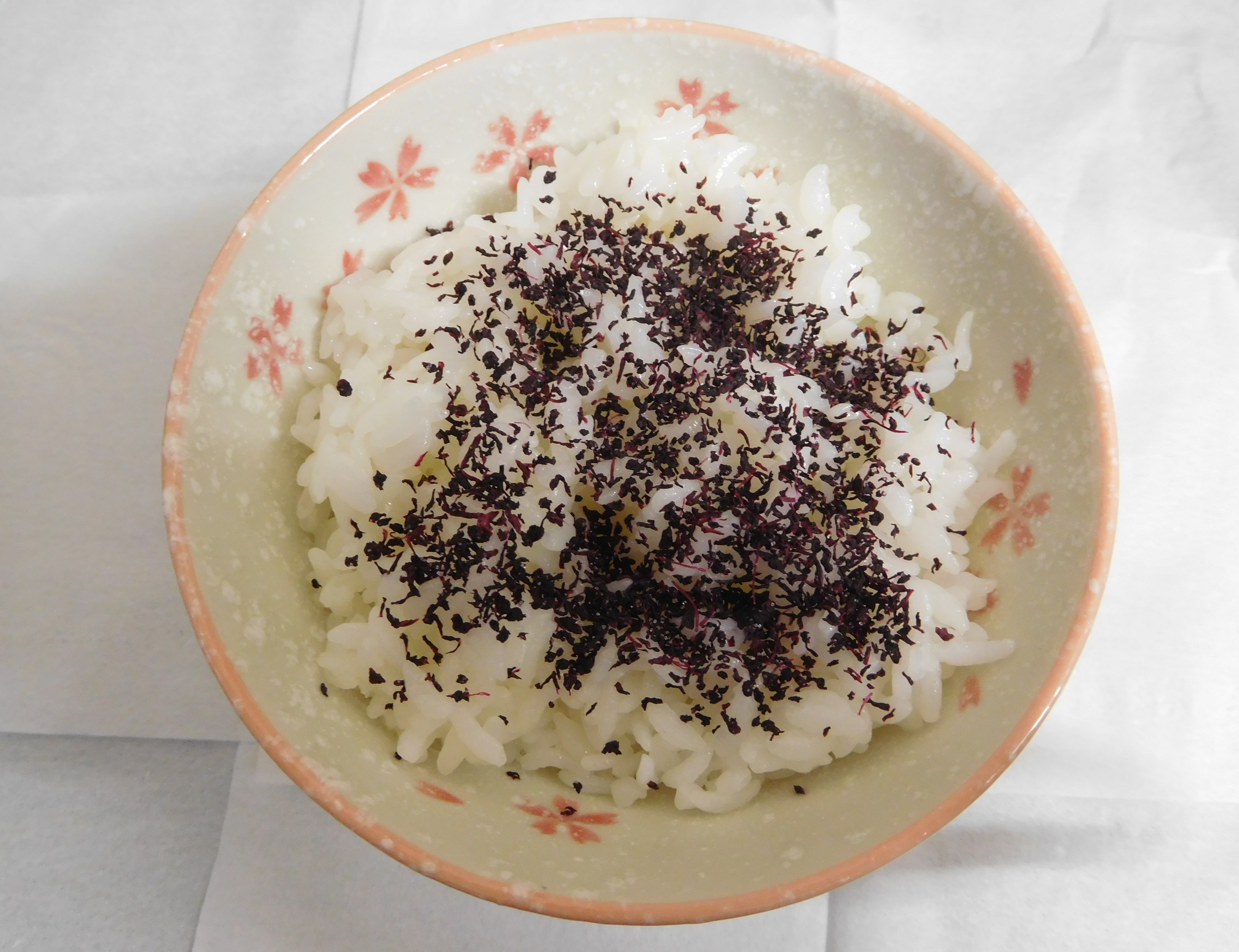
Red shiso salt (yukari) on rice

==== Korea ====
In Korean cuisine, shiso is called soyeop (소엽) or chajogi (차조기). It is less popular than the related cultigen, P. frutescens (deulkkae). Soyeop is commonly seen as a wild plant, and the leaves are occasionally used as a ssam vegetable. Red leaves are sometimes pickled in soy sauce or soybean paste as a jangajji, or deep-fried as bugak with a thin coat of rice-flour batter.

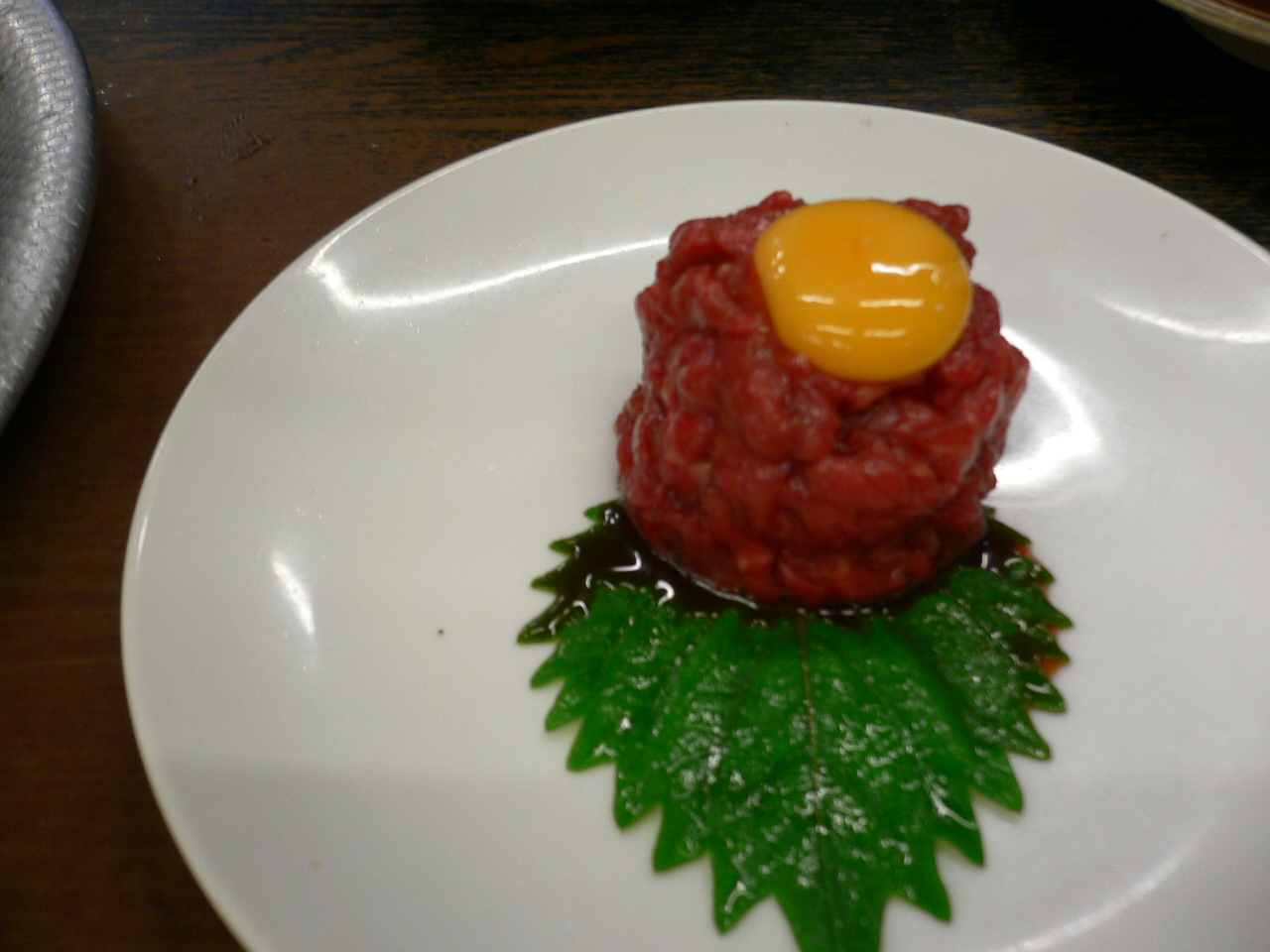
Yukhoe (raw steak) with green shiso leaf

=== Southeast Asia ===
==== Laos ====
In Laos, red shiso leaves are called pak maengda (ຜັກແມງດາ). They are used to add fragrance to khao poon (ເຂົ້າປຸ້ນ), a rice vermicelli dish that is similar to the Vietnamese bún.

==== Vietnam ====
In Vietnam, shiso is called tía tô. Compared to Japanese shiso, it has slightly smaller leaves but a much stronger aromatic flavor. Vietnamese tía tô are often bicolored, with leaves that are red on the backside.

Tía tô leaves are used in Vietnamese cuisine for salads, soups, or stir-fried dishes. The strong flavors are perfect for cooking seafoods such as shrimp and fish dishes. They are eaten as a garnish with bún (rice vermicelli). Leaves are also pickled.

== Biochemistry ==
Shiso's distinctive flavor comes from perillaldehyde, which is found only in low concentrations in other perilla varieties, including Perilla frutescens. The oxime of perillaldehyde, perillartine, is about 2,000 times sweeter than sucrose. However, perillartine has a bitter aftertaste and is not soluble in water, and is only used in Japan as an artificial sweetener to sweeten tobacco.

Wild shiso is rich in perilla ketone, which is a potent lung toxin to some livestock. When consumed by cattle and horses, it causes pulmonary edema, leading to a condition sometimes called perilla mint toxicosis. Effects on humans remain to be studied.

The plant produces the natural product perilloxin, which is built around a 3-benzoxepin moiety. Like aspirin, perilloxin inhibits the enzyme cyclooxygenase with an IC_{50} of 23.2 μM.

Other chemotypes include eschscholzia ketone, perillene, and the phenylpropanoids myristicin, dillapiole, elemicin, citral, and a type rich in rosefuran.

Shiso contains only about 25.2–25.7% lipid, but still contains a comparable 60% ratio of ALA. Aromatic essential oils present are limonene, caryophyllene, and farnesene.

Bactericidal and preservative effects of shiso, due to the presence of terpenes such as perilla alcohol, have been noted.

== Cultivation ==
In temperate climates, the plant is self-sowing, but the seeds are not viable after long storage, and germination rates are low after a year.

=== Japan ===
View source data.

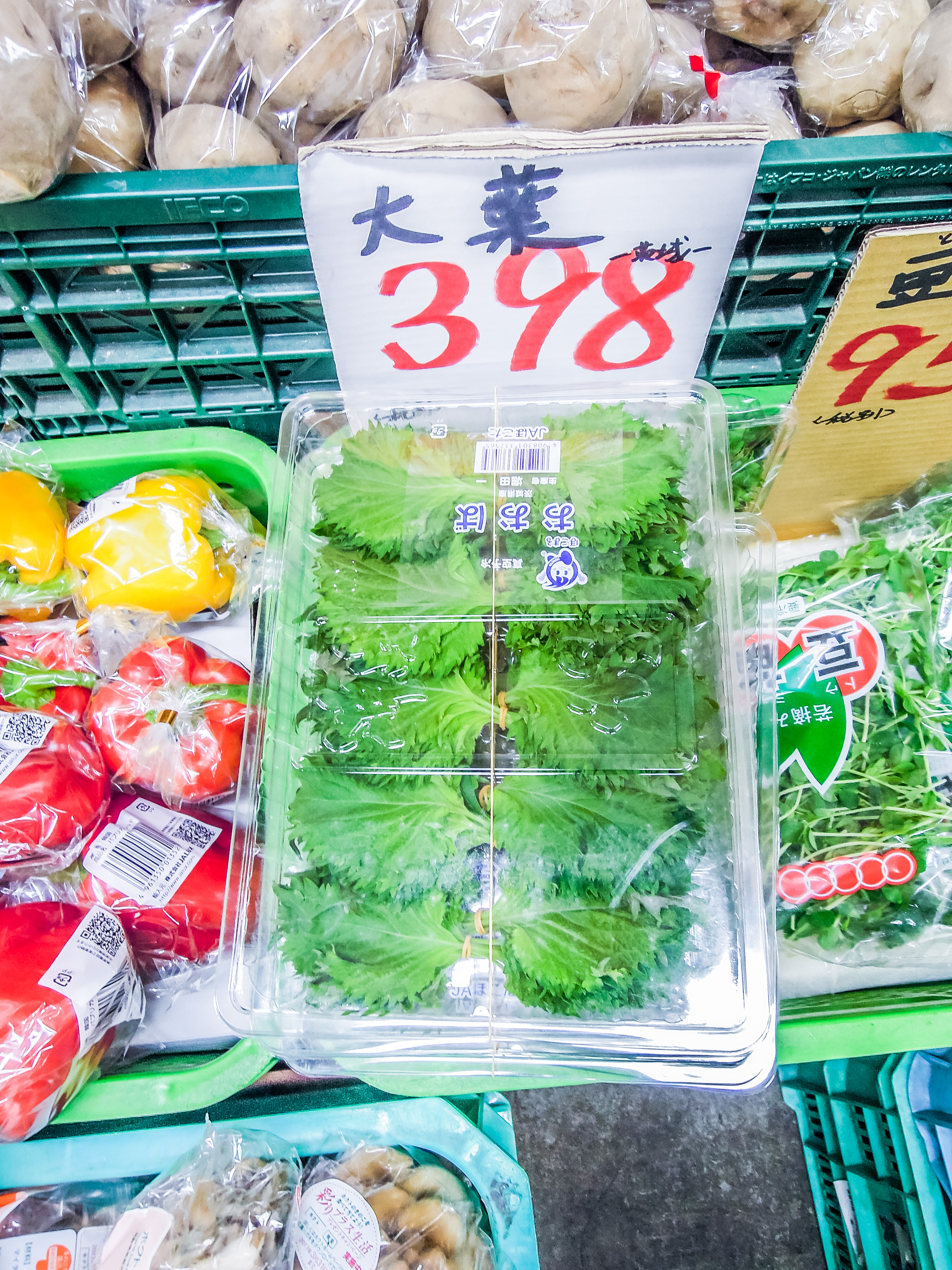
Green shiso leaves (ōba) being sold at a market in Ibaraki, Japan

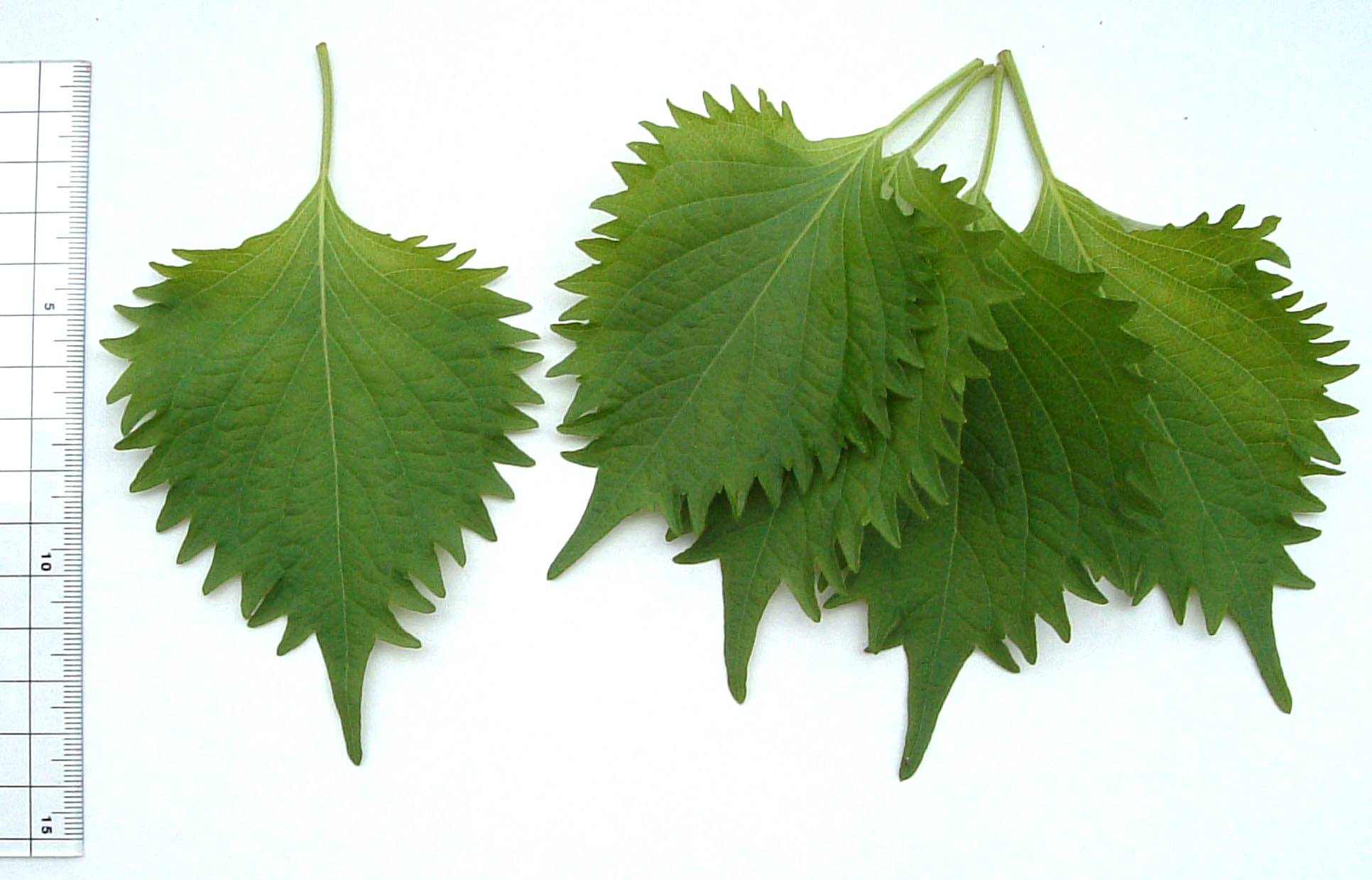
Green shiso leaves (ōba)

The bar graph shows the trend in total production of shiso in Japan, as given by the Ministry of Agriculture, Forestry and Fisheries

The biggest producer of shiso for the food market is Aichi Prefecture, boasting 3,852 tons, or 37.0% of national production (2008 data). Data for greenhouse production, which is a better indicator of crop yield, gives 3,528 tons for Aichi Prefecture, or 56% share of national production. The difference in percentage is an indicator that in Aichi, the leaves are 90% greenhouse produced, whereas nationwide the ratio is 60:40 in favor of indoors over open fields. In Aichi Prefecture, the city of Toyohashi produces the most shiso in Japan. They are followed in ranking by Namegata, Ibaraki.

There seems to be a growth spurt for shiso crops grown for industrial use. The data shows the following trend for crops targeted for oil and perfumery.

==== History ====
Green shiso was not industrially grown until the 1960s. Production volume remained negligible until 1976. Several accounts exist regarding the beginnings of shiso production.

According to one anecdote, in 1961, a food co-operative from Shizuoka specializing in tsuma (garnishes) began shipping green shiso to the Osaka market, where it grew so popular the name ōba (大葉 "big leaf") became the trade name for bunches of picked green leaves.

Another account places the start of green shiso production origin in the city of Toyohashi, the foremost ōba producer in the country. It claims that the Toyohashi Greenhouse Horticultural Agricultural Cooperative (Note: Toyohashi Engei Nōkyō (豊橋園芸農協).) experimented with planting green shiso around 1955, and started merchandising the leaves as ōba around 1962. In 1963 they organized "cooperative sorting and sales" of the crop, and achieved year-round production around 1970.

In the 1970s refrigerated storage and transport became available, bringing fresh produce and seafood to areas away from farms or seaports. Foods like sashimi became daily fare, and so too did sashimi garnishes like green shiso.

The word ōba was originally a trade name and was not listed in the popular dictionary Shin Meikai Kokugo Jiten as "green shiso" until its 5th edition (1997).

== See also ==
- Tantakatan

== Works cited ==
Herb books

- Larkcom, Joy (2007). Oriental Vegetables (preview). Frances Lincoln. pp. 112–. ISBN 978-0-7112-2612-8.

Cookbooks

- Andoh, Elizabeth; Beisch, Leigh (2005), Washoku: recipes from the Japanese home kitchen (google), Random House Digital, Inc., p. 47, ISBN 978-1-58008-519-9
- Mouritsen, Ole G. (2009). Sushi: Food for the Eye, the Body and the Soul. Jonas Drotner Mouritsen. Springer. pp. 110–112. ISBN 978-1-4419-0617-5.
- Shimbo, Hiroko (2001), The Japanese kitchen: 250 recipes in a traditional spirit (preview), Harvard Common Press, ISBN 978-1-55832-177-9
- Tsuji, Shizuo; Fisher, M.F.K. (2007), Japanese Cooking: A Simple Art (preview), Kodansha International, p. 89, ISBN 978-4-7700-3049-8
- Ishikawa, Takayuki (1997). Ninki no nihon ryōri: ichiryū itamae ga tehodoki suru 人気の日本料理―一流板前が手ほどきする [Chef's Best Choice Japanese Cuisine]. Bessatsu Kateigaho mook. Sekaibunkasha. ISBN 978-4-418-97143-5.

Nutrition and chemistry

- O'Brien-Nabors, Lyn (2011), Alternative Sweeteners (preview), CRC Press, p. 235, ISBN 978-1-4398-4614-8
- Yu, He-Ci; Kosuna, Kenichi; Haga, Megumi (1997), Perilla: the genus Perilla, Medicinal and aromatic plants--industrial profiles, vol. 2, CRC Press, ISBN 978-90-5702-171-8, pp. 26–7

Japanese dictionaries

- Shinmura, Izuru (1976). Kōjien 広辞苑. Iwanami.
- Satake, Yoshisuke [in Japanese]; Nishi, Sadao; Motoyama, Tekishū [in Japanese] (1969) [1968]. "Shiso" しそ. Sekai hyakka jiten. Vol. 10. Heibonsha. pp. 246–7. (in Japanese)
- Kindaichi, Kyōsuke (1997), Shin Meikai Kokugo Jiten 新明解国語辞典 (5th ed.), Sanseido, ISBN 978-4-385-13099-6

Japanese misc. sites

- Okashin. "Aichi no jiba sangyō" あいちの地場産業. Archived from the original on 2007-08-12.: right navbar "9 農業(野菜)"

Ministry statistics

- MAFFstat (2012a). "地域特産野菜生産状況調査(regional specialty vegetables production status study)".. It gives to ink to H12 (FY2000), H14 (FY2002), H16 (FY2004), H18 (FY2006), H20 (FY2008) figures. They are not direct links to Excel sheets, but jump to TOC pages at e-stat.go.jp site. The latest available is TOC for The FY2008(年次) Regional Specialty Vegetable Production Status Study, published 11/26/2010. Under Category 3-1 Vegetables by crop and prefecture: acreage, harvest yield, etc. (野菜の品目別、都道府県別生産状況 作物面積収穫量等), find 10th crop shiso (しそ), and click Excel button to open p008-20-014.xls. Under Category 3–2, you can also retrieve Vegetable by crop and prefecture: major cutivars at major-producing municipalities (野菜の品目別、都道府県別生産状況 主要品種主要市町村 ).
- MAFFstat (2012b). "食料需給表 (food supply & demand tables)".. for data (h001-21-071.xls).
- MAFFstat (2012c). "特産農作物の生産実績調査(specialty vegetables production realized study)".. Links to H14 (FY2000) – H19 (FY2007) biannual figures, not direct link to Excel but jump to TOC pages at e-stat.go.jp site. The latest available is TOC for The FY2007(年次) Specialty Vegetable Production Realized Study, published 3/23/2010. Locate 1-1-10 is Shiso (しそ), where heading reads " Industrial crop sown acreage and production" (工芸作物の作付面積及び生産量, and click Excel button to open p003-19-010.xls.
- Tucker, Arthur O.; DeBaggio, Thomas (2009), The Encyclopedia of Herbs: a comprehensive reference to herbs of flavor and (preview), Timber Press, p. 389, ISBN 978-0-88192-994-2
- Channell, BJ; Garst, JE; Linnabary, RD; Channell, RB (5 August 1977), "Perilla ketone: a potent lung toxin from the mint plant, Perilla frutescens Britton", Science, 197 (4303): 573–574, Bibcode:1977Sci...197..573W, doi:10.1126/science.877573, PMID 877573
- Foster, Steven; Yue, Chongxi (1992), Herbal emissaries: bringing Chinese herbs to the West: a guide to gardening, Inner Traditions / Bear & Co., pp. 306–8, ISBN 978-0-89281-349-0
- Hu, Shiu-ying (2005), Food plants of China, vol. 1, Chinese University Press, ISBN 978-962-996-229-6
- Oikawa, Kazushi; Toyama, Ryo (2008), "Analysis of Nutrition and the Functionality Elements in Perilla Seeds", 岩手県工業センター研究報告, 15 pdf (in Japanese except abstract)
- Imamura, Keiji (1996), Prehistoric Japan – New Perspectives on Insular East Asia, Honolulu: University of Hawaii Press, pp. 107–8, ISBN 978-0-8248-1852-4
- Habu, Junko (2004), Ancient Jomon of Japan, Cambridge and New York: Cambridge Press, p. 59, ISBN 978-0-521-77670-7
