= Perillene =

Names
- Preferred IUPAC name 3-(4-Methylpent-3-en-1-yl)furan
- Other names Perillen; 3-Homoprenylfuran

Identifiers
| CAS Number | 539-52-6 |
| 3D model (JSmol) | Interactive image |
| ChEBI | CHEBI:74039 |
| ChemSpider | 61612 |
| PubChem CID | 68316 |
| UNII | AM4D4646ZW |
| CompTox Dashboard (EPA) | DTXSID40202167 |
- InChI: InChI=1S/C10H14O/c1-9(2)4-3-5-10-6-7-11-8-10/h4,6-8H,3,5H2,1-2H3 Key: XNGKCOFXDHYSGR-UHFFFAOYSA-N
- SMILES: o1ccc(c1)CC\C=C(/C)C

Properties
| Chemical formula | C_{10}H_{14}O |
| Molar mass | 150.221 g·mol^{−1} |
| Appearance | liquid |
| Density | 0.9017 g/mL @ 20 °C |
| Boiling point | 186 °C (367 °F; 459 K) |
- Except where otherwise noted, data are given for materials in their standard state (at 25 °C [77 °F], 100 kPa). Infobox references

Perillene is a natural monoterpene that consists of a furan ring with a six-carbon homoprenyl side chain. Perillene is a component of the essential oil obtained by extraction of the leaves of Perilla frutescens. Perillene has also been obtained by steam distillation of the leaves of Perilla frutescens. Perillene has been found to elicit distinct electrophysiological responses in the antennae of the apple blossom weevil. It has been suggested that perillene is one several molecules in the emanation bouquet of apple tree buds which may be used by adult weevils as chemical cues to discrimination during host-searching behavior.

== Applications ==
Perillene, as an active ingredient of perilla oil, has been claimed to have anti-inflammatory and bactericidal action.

== See also ==
- Perilla ketone
