= Tantakatan =

Japanese distilled drink

Tantakatan (鍛高譚) is a kind of shōchū made with perilla leaves cultivated in Shiranuka. It is produced in Asahikawa, Hokkaidō, Japan. The alcohol content is twenty percent.

== References and notes ==
- Tantakatan Tantakatan - shochucircle.com
