= Perilla frutescens =

- Perilla inflorescences and upper cauline leaves

Conservation status
- Least Concern (IUCN 3.1)

Scientific classification
- Kingdom: Plantae
- Clade: Tracheophytes
- Clade: Angiosperms
- Clade: Eudicots
- Clade: Asterids
- Order: Lamiales
- Family: Lamiaceae
- Genus: Perilla
- Species: P. frutescens

Binomial name
- Perilla frutescens (L.) Britton

Synonyms
- List: Ocimum frutescens L.; Perilla frutescens var. typica Makino; Perilla ocymoides L.; Perilla urticifolia Salisb.

Species of flowering plant

Perilla frutescens is a species of Perilla in the mint family Lamiaceae. It is an annual plant native to eastern Russia, South and Southeast Asia, and has been introduced to parts of eastern Asia, Europe, and North America. It prefers subtropical habitats.

An edible plant, perilla is grown in gardens and attracts butterflies. It has a strong mint-like smell. The major volatile compound responsible for this characteristic aroma is perilla ketone concentrated in the leaves.

In the United States, Perilla frutescens is a pest weed, toxic to cattle after ingestion.

== Description ==
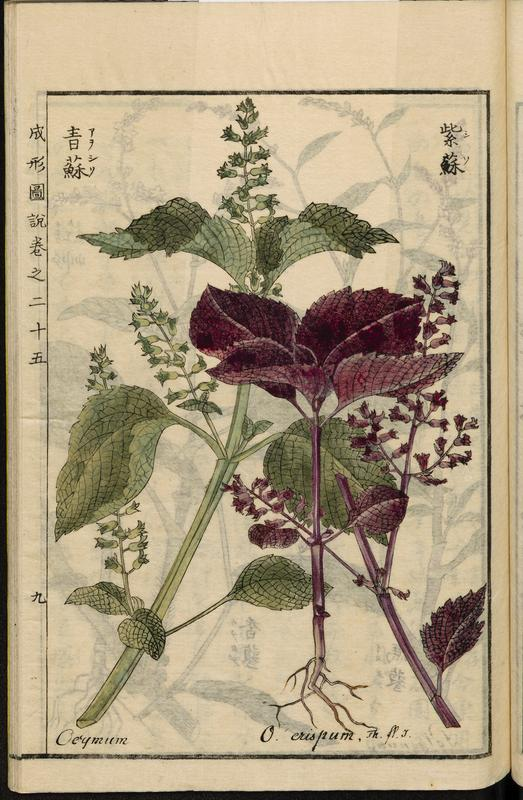
Perilla frutescens (L.) Britton from the Japanese Seikei Zusetsu agricultural encyclopedia

Perilla is an annual plant growing 60–90 cm (24–35 in) tall, with stalks which are hairy and square.

The leaves are opposite, 7–12 cm (3–4 1/2 in) long and 5–8 cm (2–3 in) wide, with a broad oval shape, pointy ends, serrated (saw-toothed) margins, and long leafstalks. The leaves are green with occasional touches of purple on the underside.

The flowers bloom on racemes at the end of branches and the main stalk in late summer. The calyx, 3–4 mm (1/8–5/32 in) long, consist of upper three sepals and the hairy lower two. The corolla is 4–5 mm (5/32–3/16 in) long with its lower lip longer than the upper. Two of the four stamens are long.

The fruit is a schizocarp, 2 mm (1/16 in) in diameter, and with reticulate pattern on the outside. Perilla seeds can be soft or hard, being white, grey, brown, and dark brown in colour and globular in shape. 1000 seeds weigh about 4 g (1/8 oz).

Perilla seeds contain about 38-45% lipid.

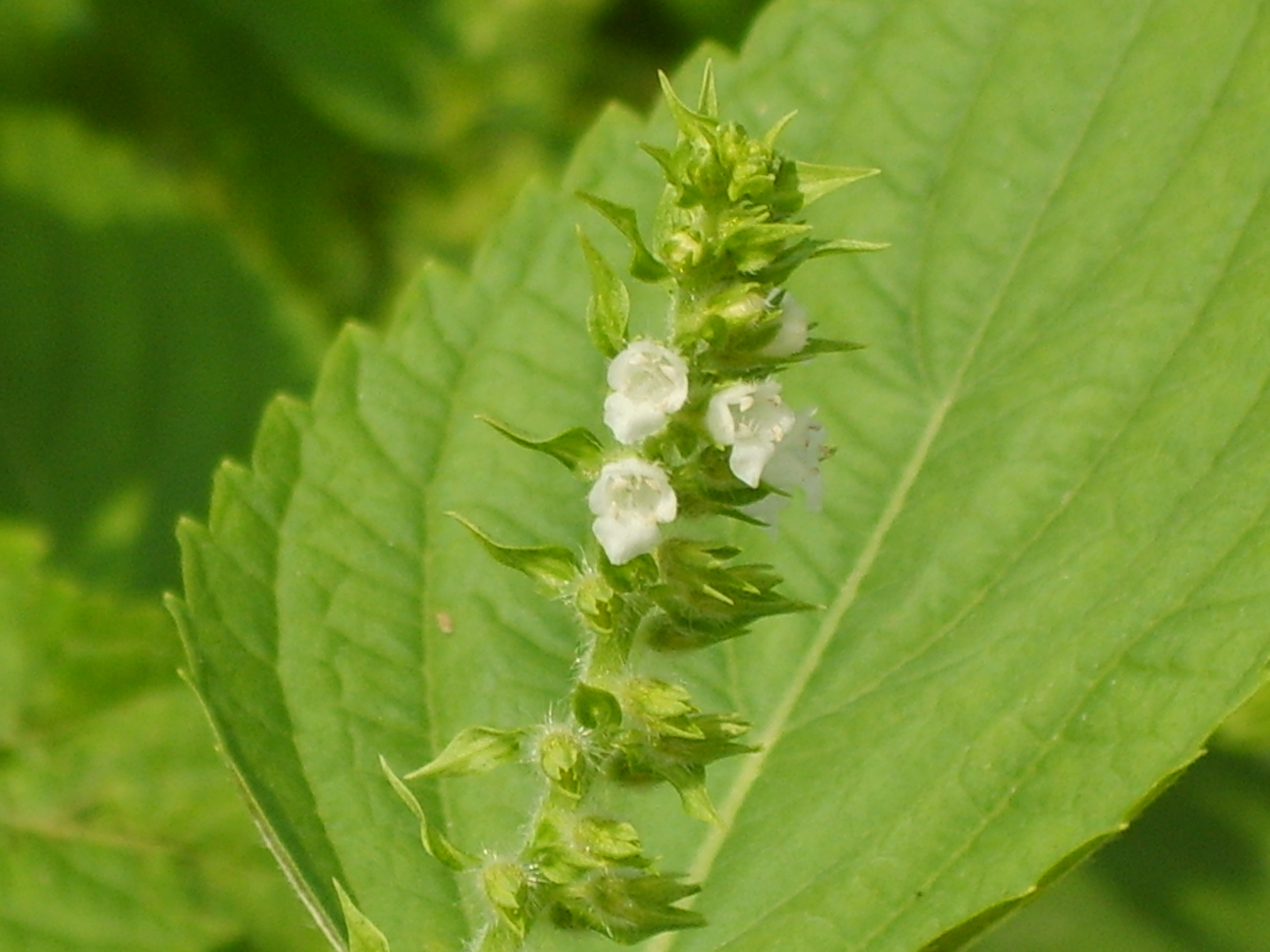
Flowers

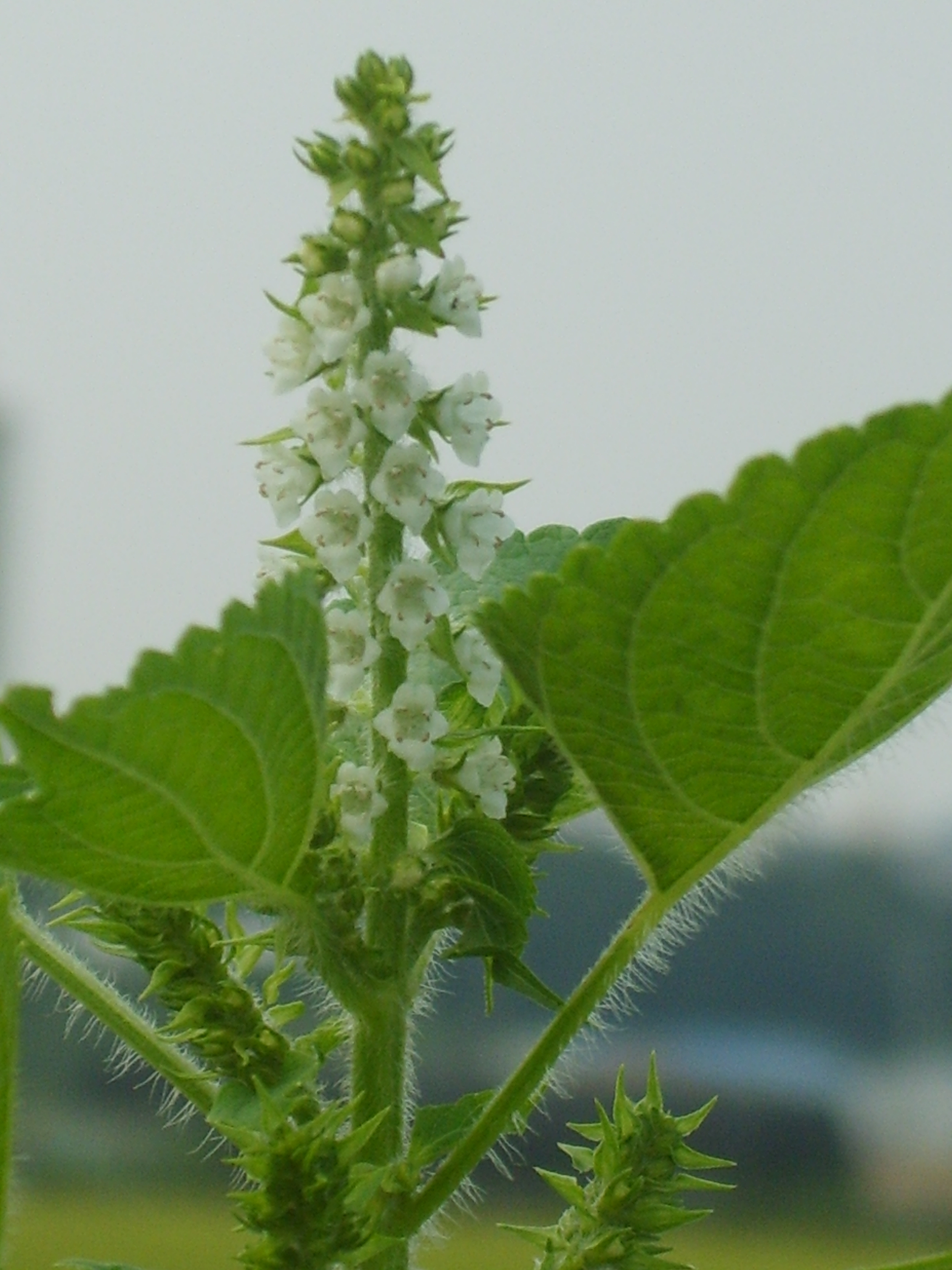
Raceme

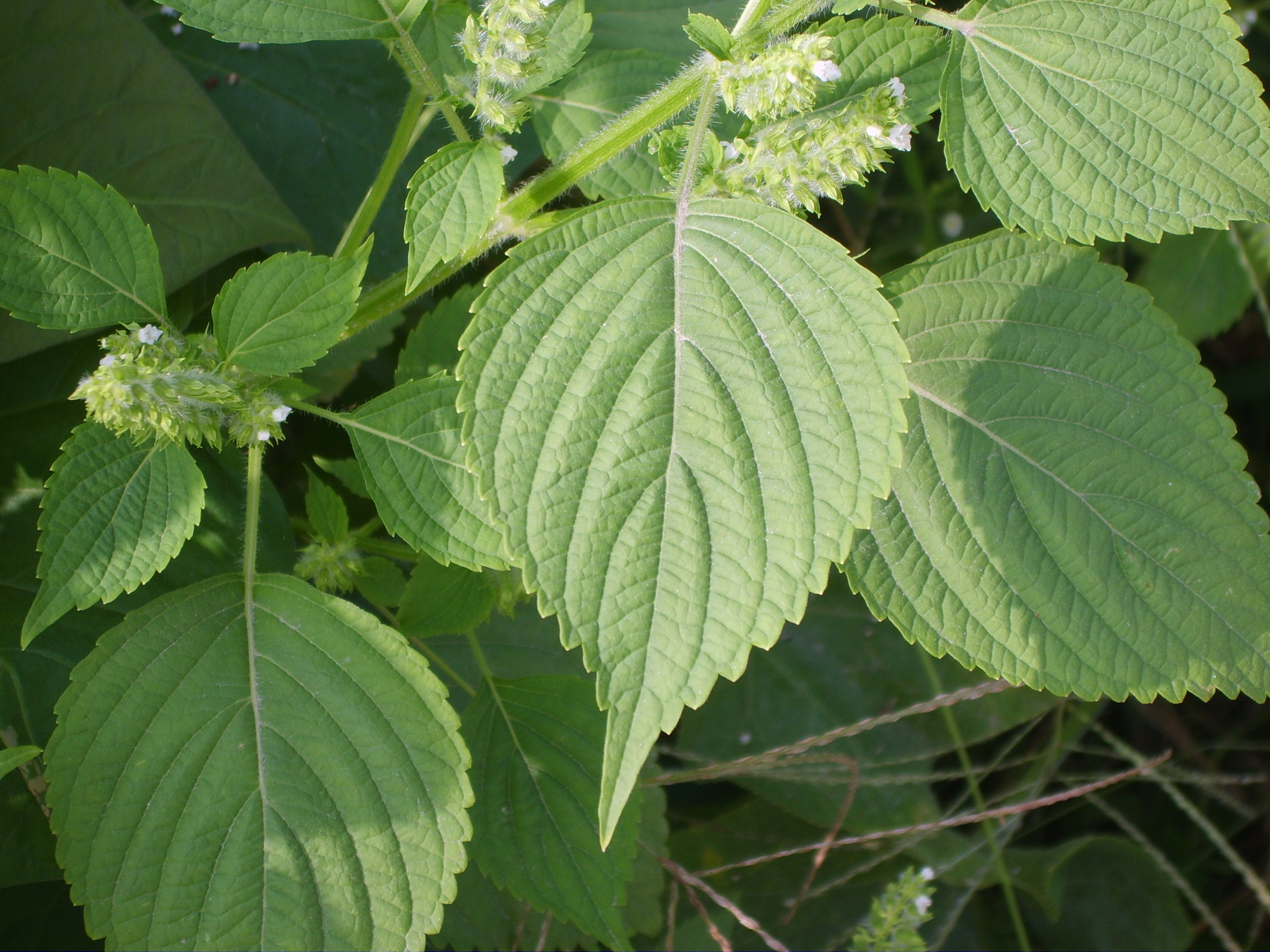
Leaves

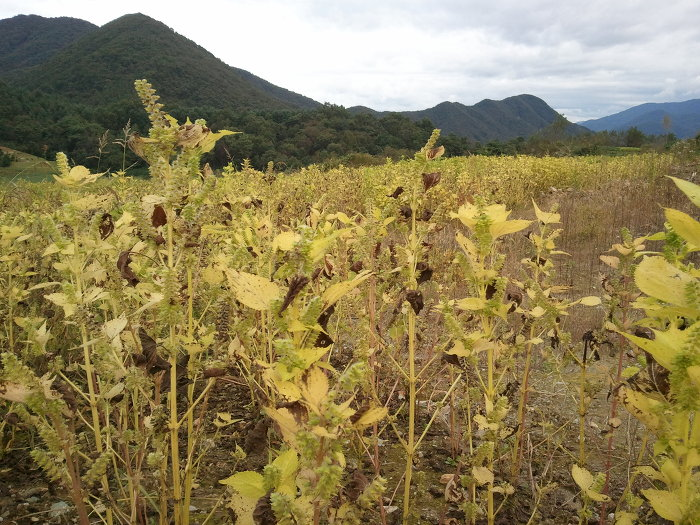
Mature plants

Fruits (mericarps)

== Taxonomy ==
=== Etymology ===
Along with other plants in the genus Perilla, the plant is commonly called "perilla". It is also referred to as 'Korean perilla,' due to its extensive cultivation in Korea and use in Korean cuisine.

In the United States, the plant is known by many names, such as perilla mint, beefsteak plant, purple perilla, Chinese basil, wild basil, blueweed, Joseph's coat, wild coleus, and rattlesnake weed.

=== Infraspecific taxa ===
Perilla frutescens has three known varieties.

- P. frutescens (var. frutescens) – called Korean perilla or deulkkae.
- P. frutescens var. crispa – also called shiso or tía tô.
- P. frutescens var. hirtella – also called lemon perilla.

The genome of a dark-leaved domesticated variety has been sequenced in 2022.

== Distribution and habitat ==
The plant is native to: Bangladesh; India especially, Eastern and Western Himalayas, and Northeast India; Nepal; Myanmar; China especially, South Central China, and Southeast China; Thailand; Laos; Vietnam; Java; Taiwan; Japan; Korea; and Russia, especially, Primorsky Krai; and Khabarovsk Krai. It was introduced to other parts of Asia, namely Inner Mongolia, Cambodia, and parts of Europe such as Germany, Romania, Ukraine and South European Russia. In addition, it was also introduced in several states of the United States and the Ontario province of Canada. After years of spreading in the United States, P. frutescens has been designated as a weed.

== Cultivation ==
=== History ===
The plant was introduced to the Korean peninsula before the Unified Silla era, when it started to be widely cultivated.

In its natural state, the yield of perilla leaves and seeds is not high. If the stem is cut about 5 cm (2 in) above ground level in summer, a new stalk grows, and it produces more fruit. Leaves can be harvested from the stem cut off in the summer, as well as from the new stalk and its branches, throughout summer and autumn. The seeds are harvested in autumn when the fruits are ripe. To collect perilla seeds, the whole plant is harvested, and the seeds are beaten out of the plant before being spread for sun-drying.

== Toxicity ==
Although perilla is widely cultivated as an edible plant for humans, it is toxic to cattle and other ruminants, as well as horses. In grazing cattle, plant ketones cause acute respiratory distress syndrome, also called "panting disease".

Contact dermatitis may occur in people handling the leaves or oil. Consumption of large amounts of seeds has resulted in anaphylaxis.

== Nutritional value ==
Perilla seeds are rich in dietary fiber and dietary minerals such as calcium, iron, niacin, protein, and thiamine. Perilla leaves are also rich in vitamins A, C and riboflavin.

== Uses ==
=== Chemical composition ===
Various perilla varieties are used for traditional medicine in Southeast Asia.

Characteristic aroma-active phytochemicals in perilla leaves include hydrocarbons, alcohols, aldehydes, furans, and ketones, particularly perilla ketone, egoma ketone, and isoegoma ketone. Other phytochemicals are alkaloids, terpenoids, quinines, phenylpropanoids, polyphenolics, flavonoids, coumarins, anthocyanins, carotenoids, neolignans, fatty acids, tocopherols, and sitosterols. Other compounds include perillaldehyde, limonene, linalool, beta-caryophyllene, menthol, and alpha-pinene. The crispa variety is differentiated by leaf and stem colors, which vary from green to red to purple, indicating the presence of anthocyanins.

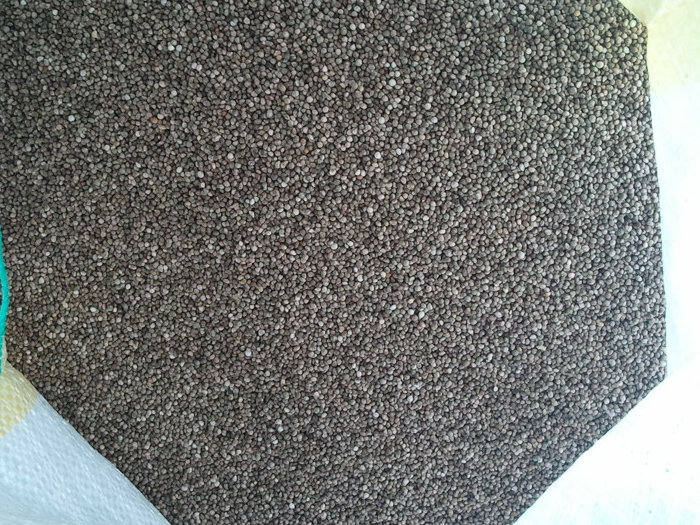
Seeds

=== Seed oil ===
Having a distinctive nutty aroma and taste, the oil pressed from the toasted perilla seeds is used as a flavor enhancer, condiment, and a cooking oil in Korean cuisine. The press cake remaining after pressing perilla oil can be used as natural fertilizer or animal feed.

=== Culinary ===
==== China ====
In Manchu cuisine, perilla leaves are used to make efen, ("steamed bun"). The perilla buns are made with glutinous sorghum or glutinous rice flour dough filled with red bean paste and wrapped with perilla leaves. The dish is related to Food Exhaustion Day, a traditional Manchu holiday celebrated on every 26th day of the 8th month of the lunisolar calendar.

==== India ====
In India, perilla seeds are roasted and ground with salt, chilis, and tomatoes to make a savoury side dish or chutney. In Kumaon, the seeds of cultivated perilla are eaten raw, the seed oil is used for cooking purposes, and the oil cake is consumed raw or fed to cattle. The roasted seeds are also ground to prepare a spicy chutney. The seeds and leaves of perilla are also used for flavoring curries in north east India. Manipuri cuisine uses the ground roasted seed in a salad. Its seeds are used in salads and meat dishes.

==== Japan ====
Although in most of Japan the milder aroma of P. frutescens var. crispa ("shiso") has traditionally been preferred over the stronger-scented P. frutescens var. frutescens ("egoma"), a local preparation in Fukushima Prefecture called jūnen mochi (Shingorou) consists of half-pounded non-glutinous rice patties skewered and coated with jūnen miso, a paste made from roasted and ground seeds of P. frutescens var. frutescens (egoma), then roasted over charcoal.

Oil pressed from the seeds was historically used in lamps. The warlord Saitō Dōsan (1494–1556) was said to have been originally a seller of egoma seed oil.

==== Korea ====
In Korean cuisine, perilla leaves (Korean: 깻잎) are widely used as a herb and a vegetable. Perilla can be used fresh as a ssam vegetable, fresh or blanched as a namul vegetable, or pickled in soy sauce or soybean paste to make pickle or kimchi.

Deulkkae, the perilla seeds, are either toasted and ground into powder, or toasted and pressed to make perilla oil. Toasted deulkkae powder is used as a spice and a condiment for soup, seasoned vegetable dishes, noodle dishes, kimchi, and fishcake. It is also used as a coating or topping for desserts: Yeot and several rice cake varieties can be coated with toasted perilla powder. Perilla oil made from toasted perilla seeds is used as a cooking oil and as a condiment.

In Korean-style western food, perilla leaves are sometimes used to substitute basil, and the seed powder and oil is used in salad dressings as well as in dipping sauces.

== Gallery ==
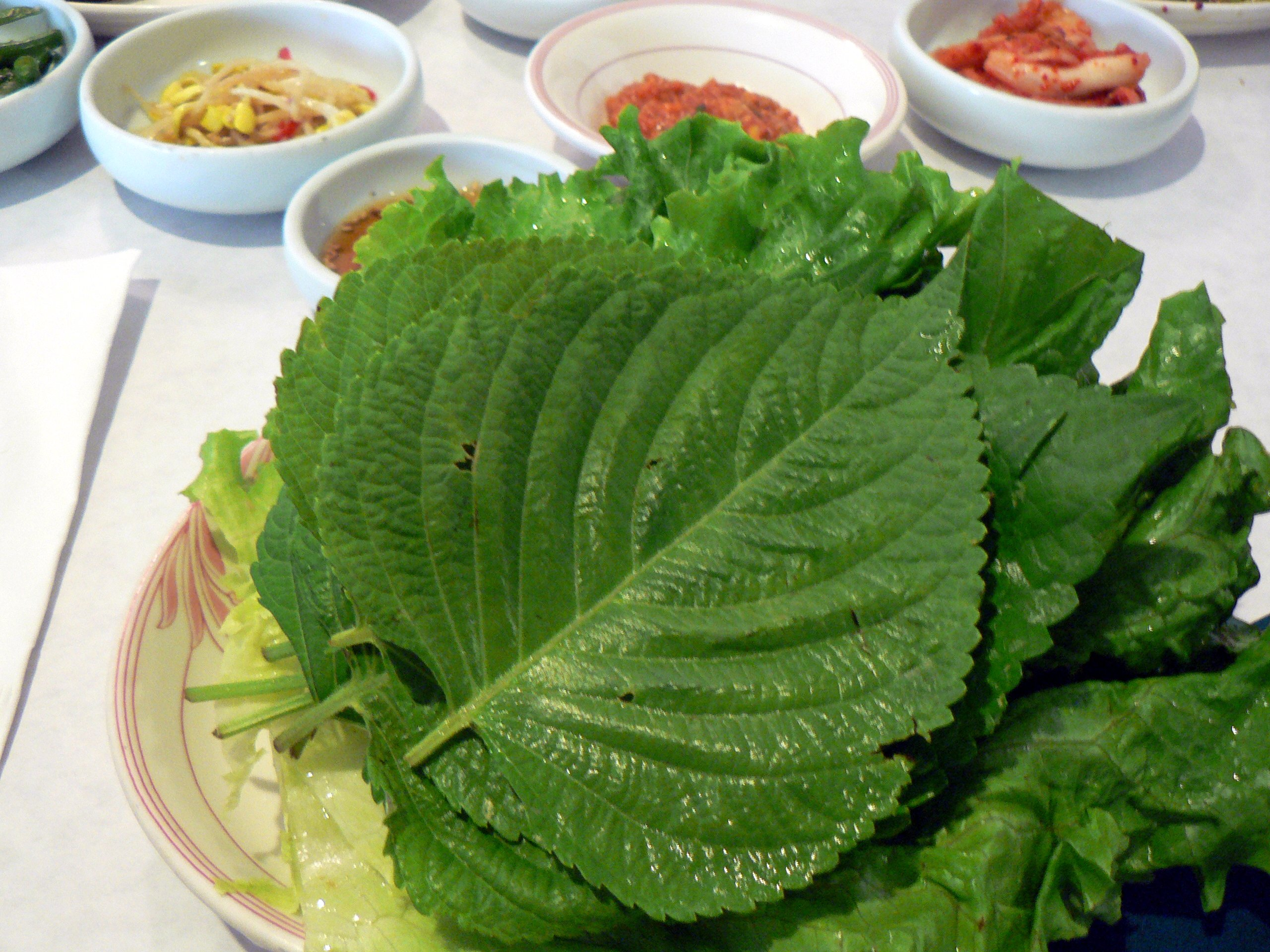
Perilla leaves as a wrap vegetable

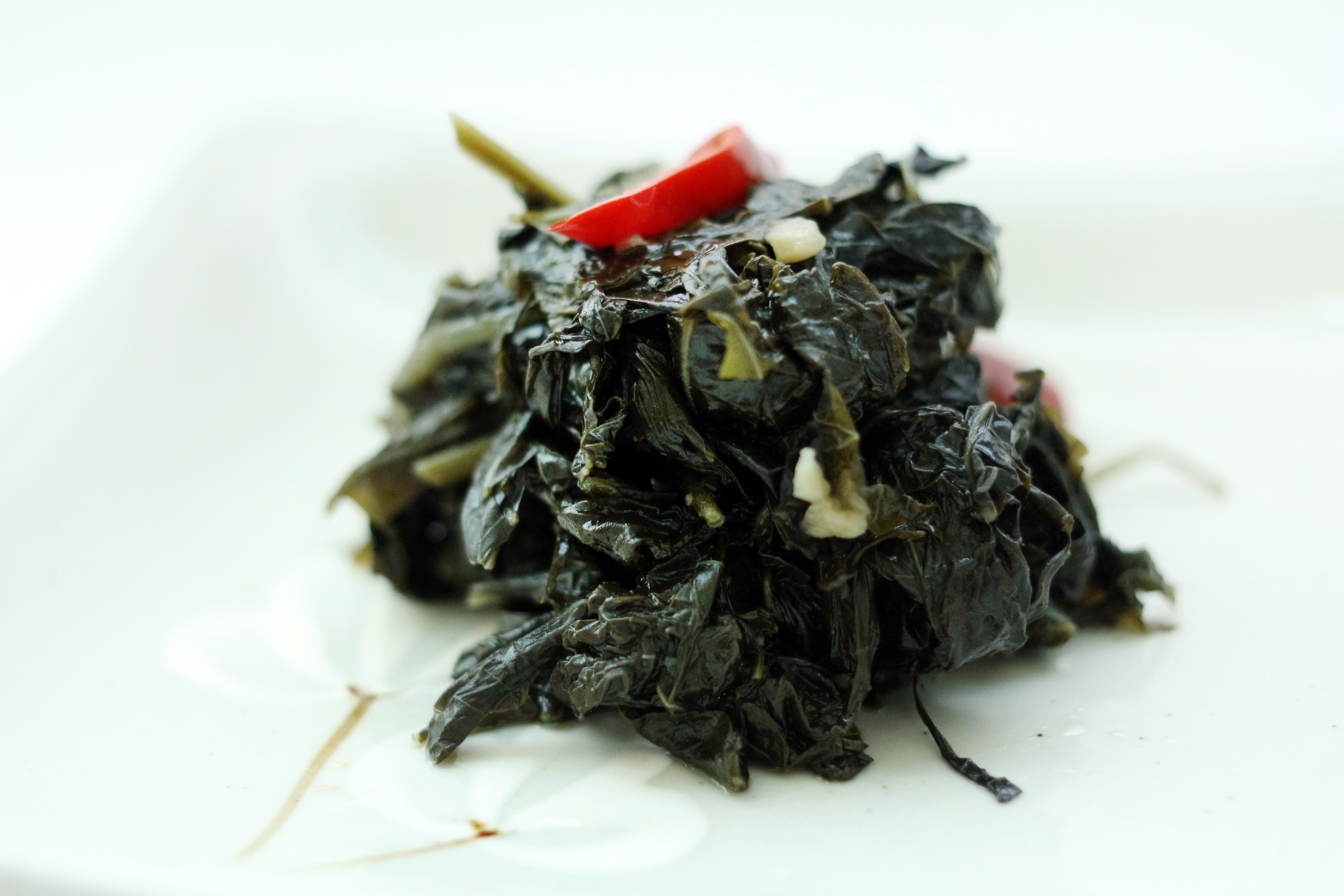
Stir-fried in perilla oil

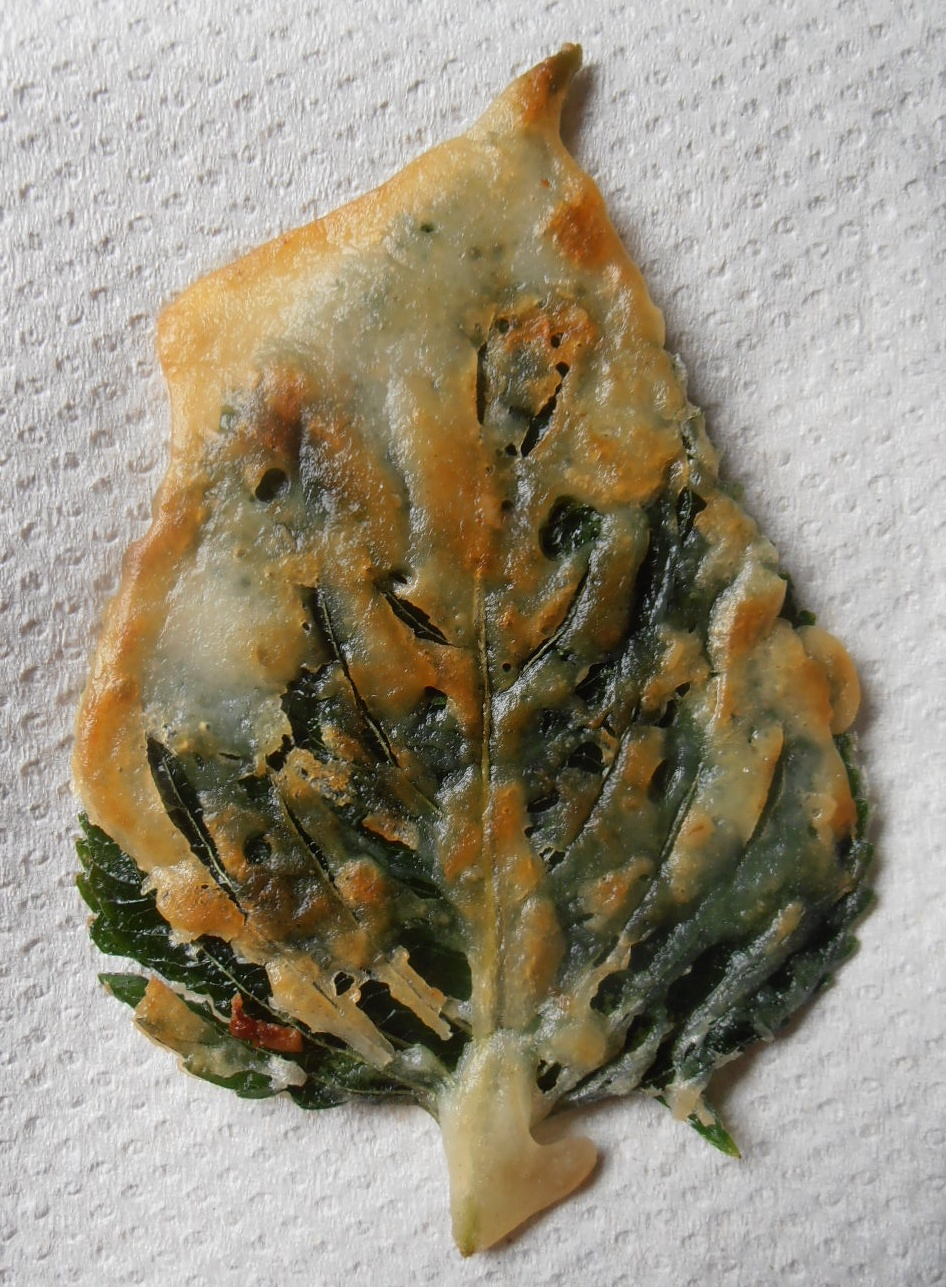
Deep-fried perilla leaves

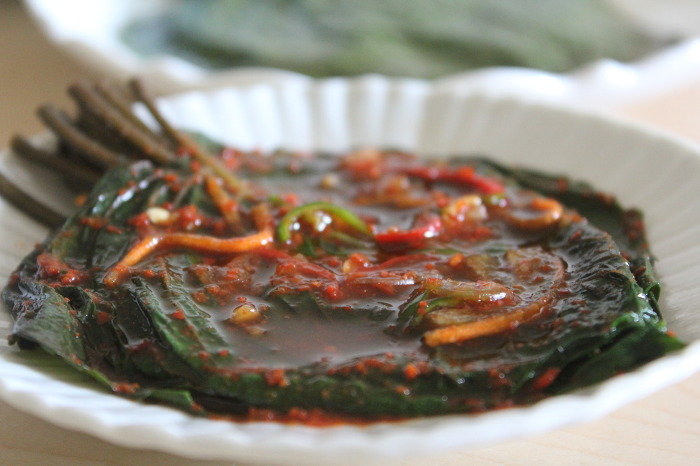
Perilla leaf kimchi

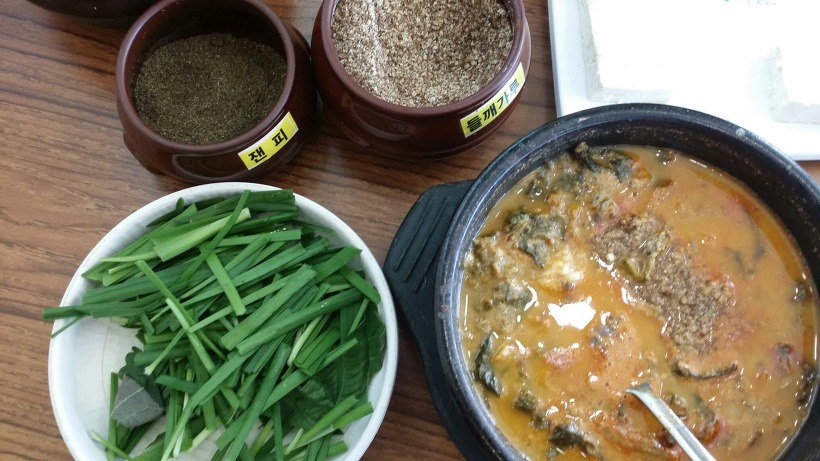
loach soup served with Zanthoxylum piperitum and perilla seed powder

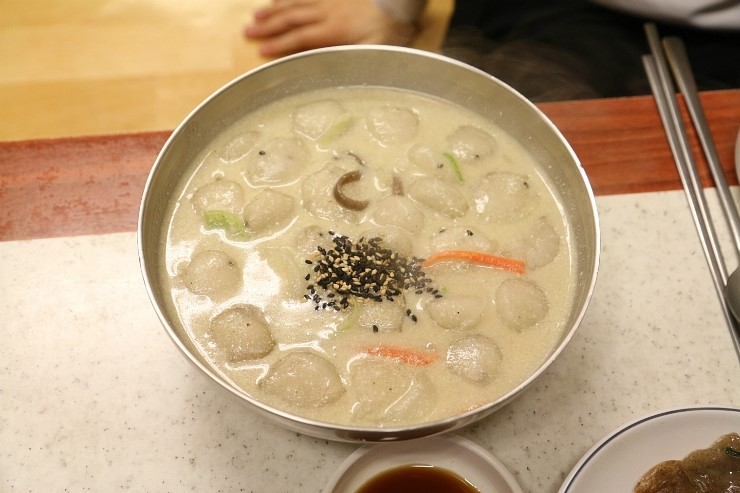
Potato dumpling soup boiled with perilla powder

== See also ==
- Shiso (Perilla frutescens var. crispa)
- Sesame (Sesamum indicum)
