= Robert Norris (footballer) =

English footballer

Rob Norris
Personal information
- Full name: Robert Norris
- Date of birth: 12 October 1987 (age 39)
- Place of birth: Radcliffe on Trent, England
- Position: Midfielder

Team information
- Current team: Loughborough Dynamo
- Number: 7

Senior career*
Years	Team	Apps	(Gls)
2004–2006	Boston United	3	(0)
2006	St Albans City	8	(0)
2006	King's Lynn	-	(-)
2006–2007	St Albans City	1	(0)
- Grantham Town
2008–2013	Loughborough Dynamo		
2013-2019	Lincoln United		
2019-2024	Loughborough Dynamo	104	(8)
2024-	Eastwood CFC		
- * Club domestic league appearances and goals as of 6 January 2020

Rob Norris (born 12 October 1987) is an English midfielder who plays for Eastwood CFC. He started his career with Football League Two club Boston United in 2004, but only made three appearances before leaving for St Albans City. He played nine times for the Saints before leaving for King's Lynn on a free transfer after finding it hard to break into the first team. However, he was with King's Lynn for just two months before he was re-signed by St Albans on 26 December 2006.
