= Perilla ketone =

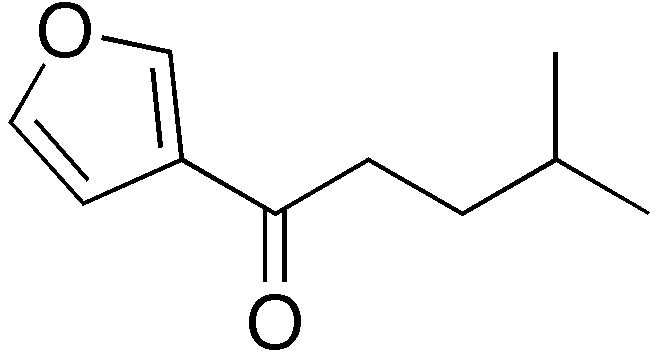

Names
- Preferred IUPAC name 1-(Furan-3-yl)-4-methylpentan-1-one
- Other names beta-Furyl isoamyl ketone

Identifiers
CAS Number	553-84-4
3D model (JSmol)	Interactive image
ChemSpider	61667
PubChem CID	68381
UNII	CV69S6Y94V
CompTox Dashboard (EPA)	DTXSID10203828
- InChI: InChI=LVHLZMUFIYAEQB-UHFFFAOYSA-N
- SMILES: CC(C)CCC(C1=COC=C1)=O

Properties
Chemical formula	C_{10}H_{14}O_{2}
Molar mass	166.217
Appearance	Liquid
Density	0.9920 g/cm^{3}
Melting point	<25 °C
Boiling point	196 °C (385 °F; 469 K)
- Except where otherwise noted, data are given for materials in their standard state (at 25 °C [77 °F], 100 kPa). verify (what is ?) Infobox references

Perilla ketone is a natural terpenoid that consists of a furan ring with a six-carbon side chain containing a ketone functional group. It is a colorless oil that is sensitive to oxygen, becoming colored upon standing. The ketone was identified in 1943 by Sebe as the main component of the essential oil of Perilla frutescens. Perilla ketone is present in the leaves and seeds of purple mint (Perilla frutescens), which is toxic to some animals. When cattle and horses consume purple mint when grazing in fields in which it grows, the perilla ketone causes pulmonary edema leading to a condition sometimes called perilla mint toxicosis.

== Synthesis ==
Perilla ketone was synthesized in 1957 by Matsuura from 3-furoyl chloride and an organocadmium compound similar to the Gilman reagent made from an isoamyl Grignard reagent and cadmium chloride. Perilla ketone has also been prepared in 74% yield via the Stille reaction from a 3-furyl-organotin compound and isocaproyl chloride in tetrahydrofuran solvent.

== See also ==
- Perillene
