= Tom Hurst (politician) =

American politician

Member of the Missouri House of Representatives from the 62nd district
- Incumbent
- Assumed office 2013

Personal details
- Born: February 10, 1966 (age 60) Jefferson, Missouri
- Party: Republican
- Spouse: Staci
- Children: Three
- Profession: Accountant; Rancher

Tom Hurst (born February 10, 1966) is an American politician. He has been a member of the Missouri House of Representatives since 2013 and is a member of the Republican Party.

Hurst graduated from the University of Missouri in 1988 with a bachelor's degree in accounting. He has been an accountant at Hurst Tax and Accounting since 1994.
