= Tom Hurst (footballer) =

English footballer

Personal information
- Full name: Thomas William Hurst
- Date of birth: 23 September 1987 (age 39)
- Place of birth: Leicester, England
- Height: 6 ft 1 in (1.85 m)
- Position: Defender

Senior career*
Years	Team	Apps	(Gls)
2005–2006	Boston United	20	(0)
- * Club domestic league appearances and goals as of 19:22, 22 September 2008 (UTC)

Thomas William Hurst (23 September 1987) is an English former footballer.

== Career ==
Hurst was born on 23 September 1987 in Leicester, Leicestershire and started his career with Boston United and played for one game for them in the Football League, a 4–2 defeat to Rushden & Diamonds on 16 April 2005. He could only feature for the youth team during the 2005–06 season, and made 20 appearances.

After leaving Boston on 1 July 2005, he was offered a contract with York City.
