= C9H13NO2 =

The molecular formula C_{9}H_{13}NO_{2} (molar mass: 167.20 g/mol, exact mass: 167.094629) may refer to:

- Azaspirodecanedione
- Deoxyepinephrine
- Ecgonidine
- Ethinamate
- meta-Hydroxynorephedrine
- para-Hydroxynorephedrine
- Metaraminol
- alpha-Methyldopamine
- 3-Methoxytyramine
- Oxime V
- Phenylephrine
- Pyrithyldione
- Synephrine
- Tyrosinol
- 1С-H
- 3-Hydroxy-4-methoxyphenethylamine
