= Perilla (disambiguation) =

Perilla may refer to any of the following subjects:

== Animals ==
- Perilla - a spider genus with the sole species Perilla teres

== Plants and plant products ==
- Perilla - a genus of plants of the mint family
  - Perilla frutescens (deulkkae), a plant used in Korean cuisine
  - Perilla frutescens var. crispa (shiso), a plant used in Japanese cuisine
- Perilla oil - oil from the seeds of deulkkae
- perilla sugar - perillartine, a sweetener

== People ==
- Perilla – pet name of Caecilia Metella (daughter of Metellus Celer), given by her lover Ticida
- Perilla (in Ovid) – a (possibly fictional) young Roman poet addressed in a letter by Ovid

== Places ==
- Perilla de Castro - a municipality located in Spain
- Perilla Mountains - a mountain range in Cochise County, Arizona
- Perilla (restaurant) - a New York City based restaurant owned by Harold Dieterle

== Other uses ==
- perilla aldehyde - perillaldehyde, a flavoring
- Perilla ketone - a natural terpenoid

== See also ==
- Parilla (disambiguation)
- Parrilla (disambiguation)
