= Dihydroxyamphetamine =

Dihydroxyamphetamine may refer to:

- meta-Hydroxynorephedrine (3,β-dihydroxyamphetamine)
- para-Hydroxynorephedrine (4,β-dihydroxyamphetamine)
- Metaraminol ((1R,2S)-3,β-dihydroxyamphetamine)
- α-Methyldopamine (3,4-dihydroxyamphetamine)
- N,N-Dihydroxyamphetamine
