= Perillyl-alcohol dehydrogenase =

Identifiers
- EC no.: 1.1.1.144
- CAS no.: 37250-73-0

Databases
- IntEnz: IntEnz view
- BRENDA: BRENDA entry
- ExPASy: NiceZyme view
- KEGG: KEGG entry
- MetaCyc: metabolic pathway
- PRIAM: profile
- PDB structures: RCSB PDB PDBe PDBsum
- Gene Ontology: AmiGO / QuickGO
Search
- PMC: articles
- PubMed: articles
- NCBI: proteins

Perillyl-alcohol dehydrogenase (EC 1.1.1.144) is an enzyme that catalyzes the chemical reaction

(-)-perillyl alcohol
+ NAD^{+}
H^{+}
H^{+}
(-)-perillaldehyde
+ NADH

The two substrates of this enzyme are (-)-perillyl alcohol and oxidised nicotinamide adenine dinucleotide (NAD^{+}). Its products are (-)-perillaldehyde, reduced NADH, and a proton.

This enzyme belongs to the family of oxidoreductases, specifically those acting on the CH-OH group of donor with NAD^{+} or NADP^{+} as acceptor. The systematic name of this enzyme class is perillyl-alcohol:NAD^{+} oxidoreductase. This enzyme is also called perillyl alcohol dehydrogenase. In Perilla frutescens, it is part of the pathway from the monoterpene, (S)-limonene to (–)-perillaldehyde.
