= Parrilla =

Parrilla may refer to:

- La Parrilla, a municipality in the province of Valladolid, Castile and León, Spain
  - La Parrilla mine, a source of tungsten
- Parrilla (torture), a style of torture involving a metal frame that takes its name from the grill
- a style of grill used for cooking asado (barbecue), commonly found in Latin America, particularly Mexico, Argentina, Venezuela, Colombia, Chile, Uruguay and Paraguay

== People ==
- Bolívar Urrutia Parrilla (1918–2005), soldier and president of Panama
- Bruno Rodríguez Parrilla (born 1958), Cuban diplomat and politician
- David Sanchez Parrilla (born 1978), Spanish footballer
- Diego Ortiz Parrilla, Governor of Coahuila, Viceroyalty of New Spain 1764–1765
- Gonzalo Fernández Parrilla (active from 2006), Spanish scholar and translator of Arabic literature
- José Parrilla (born 1972), American middle distance runner
- Lana Parrilla (born 1977), American actress
- Sam Parrilla (1943–1994), Puerto Rican baseball player

== See also ==
- Parilla (disambiguation)
- Parrillas, a municipality in the province of Toledo, Castile-La Mancha, Spain
- Parrillas One, a football team based in San Pedro Sula, Cortés, Honduras
  - Estadio Parrillas One, a football stadium in La Lima, Honduras
- Perilla (disambiguation)
- San Lorenzo de la Parrilla, a municipality in the province of Cuenca, Castile-La Mancha, Spain
