= ELOM-080 =

Essential oil

ELOM-080 (previous designation Myrtol, registered trade mark) is the active ingredient of the herbal medicine named GeloMyrtol forte. The acronym ELOM stands for the oils from Eucalyptus, Lemon, (Sweet) Orange and Myrtle that it contains.

The active ingredient is a special distillate of rectified eucalyptus, sweet orange, myrtle and lemon oil in the ratio 66:32:1:1. It has mucolytic and expectorant actions and is therefore used for acute and chronic bronchitis as well as sinusitis (inflammations of the nasal sinuses).

ELOM-080 is a phytotherapeutic extract (distillate) consisting mainly of three monoterpenes: (+)-α-pinene, d-limonene, and eucalyptol (not be confused with Eucalyptus oil).

The active ingredient is produced by the German manufacturer G. Pohl-Boskamp GmbH & Co. KG with registered offices in Hohenlockstedt.

== Indication and type of use ==
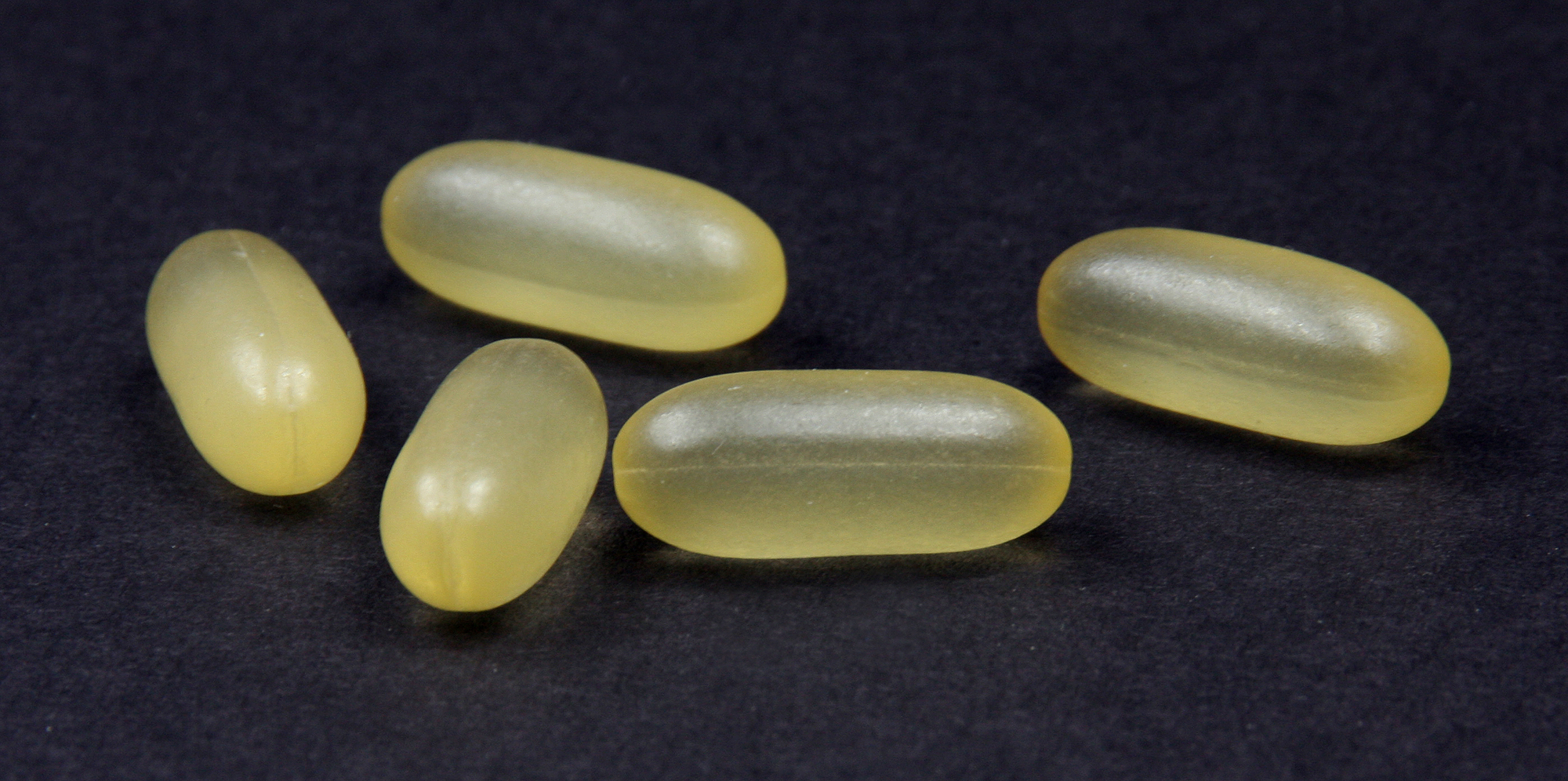
ELOM-080 capsules

ELOM-080 is used to break up mucus and to facilitate sputum expectoration in cases of acute and chronic bronchitis as well as to break up mucus in cases of inflammations of the nasal sinuses (sinusitis). The active ingredient is administered in the form of enteric soft gelatine capsules, which, if used properly, first release the special distillate of essential oils in the small intestine.

== Scientific evidence ==
There are more than 100 preclinical studies on pharmacodynamics, pharmacokinetics and toxicity as well as 28 clinical studies, involving approximately 7,000 patients. ELOM-080 is recognised as that active ingredient based on essential oils whose efficacy is best proved by modern clinical studies.

=== Active effects/pharmacodynamics ===
The following actions are attributed to the active ingredient:

- Mucolytic (mucus-breaking) action: In one in vitro study, sputum samples of patients with bronchial asthma, chronic bronchitis and cystic fibrosis were examined. After addition of ELOM-080, the viscoelasticity of the sputum decreased by approximately 10 to 16%. These values are comparable with effects of N-acetylcysteine.
- Secretomotor action (increased ciliary beat frequency): By virtue of their wavelike coordinated motions, the tiny hairs (cilia) of the mucosal cells assist in clearance of mucus from the airways. The beat frequency of these cilia is accelerated by ELOM-080, thus shortening the mucus transit time. Thus, in one study, the ciliary beat frequency of mucous membrane samples was recorded with a microscope and a connected high-speed camera. The special distillate increased the ciliary beat frequency significantly in doses corresponding to the customary dosage in humans. In the process, the active ingredient tended to be more effective than N-acetylcysteine. In further studies, it was possible to demonstrate an increase of 48% in the ciliary beat frequency.
- Secretolytic (mucus-liquefying) action: A mucus-liquefying effect has been observed in mice under administration of ELOM-080. In a direct comparison with untreated animals, the secretolytic action was increased by 32%. It was also increased by 21% during treatment with a pure eucalyptus oil preparation. According to studies, this effect is to be attributed to increased chloride ion efflux, which leads to an osmotic gradient across the mucous membranes and in turn to passive water efflux. The increased hydration of the mucus leads to its liquefaction.
- Increase of the mucociliary clearance: Due to the cited mucolytic, secretolytic and secretomotor effects, the natural cleaning mechanism of the mucous membranes is supported by ELOM-080. This means that mucus, inhaled particles and pathogens are increasingly evacuated (technically speaking: Mucociliary-Clearance-Enhancer, MCC-Enhancer). In one investigation on human cells of nasal mucous membranes, it was possible to demonstrate an increase of 46% in mucociliary clearance after addition of ELOM-080. This effect may have prevented the formation of bacterial biofilms. It is suspected that such biofilms are capable of causing chronic nasal sinus inflammations. Biofilms protect the pathogenic bacteria from the body's own defence mechanisms and from antibiotics, thus forming a durable bacterial reservoir. The effect of increased mucociliary clearance has been demonstrated experimentally and also repeatedly in human subjects.
- Antioxidative actions: Antioxidants are compounds that protect the tissues from undesired oxidation and thus from formation of potentially harmful free radicals. Natural antioxidants are found especially in plants. The antioxidative actions of ELOM-080 have been reviewed in various system in an in-vitro study. For example, the active ingredient inhibits ethylene formation by more than 50% in the SIN-System (3-morpholinosydnonimine). This was confirmed by the Fenton's reaction, with inhibition of ethylene formation by 82%, thus proving an antioxidative property of the active ingredient. This property may be responsible for preventing the tissue damage that may result, for example, after bacterial infection with Pseudomonas aeruginosa.
- Anti-inflammatory actions: Inflammations of the airways as in acute and chronic bronchitis, rhinosinusitis or in bronchial asthma are caused by various inflammatory cells and neurotransmitters (inflammation mediators). In preclinical studies, ELOM-080 has led to reduced production of inflammation mediators in inflammatory cells. Among other effects, ELOM-080 inhibits 5-lipoxygenase, a key enzyme in the inflammation cascade, as well as formation of tumor necrosis factor alpha (TNFα). Beyond this, it has been possible to show that ELOM-080 inhibits the pro-inflammatory cytokines interleukin-6 and interleukin-8 as well as reduces the granulocyte-monocyte colony stimulating factor (GM-CSF). In a mouse model for acute lung injury (ALI), ELOM-080 reduced LPS-induced lung injury, among other actions by inhibiting the neutrophil count, IL-6 and myeloperoxidase (MPO) activity. In addition, ELOM-080 inhibited the LPS-induced activation of the inflammation-promoting transcription factor NF-κB.
- Bronchospasmolytic action: In preclinical studies, ELOM-080 had a cramp-relieving or spasmolytic effect on the smooth muscles of the bronchia. For example, the intensity of histamine-induced bronchospasms was reduced in dose-dependent manner in experiments with ELOM-080.
- Antimicrobial action: Under experimental conditions, ELOM-080 inhibited various bacterial species such as pneumococci and Haemophilus influenzae to an extent depending on the dose used. These species are considered to be the most frequent bacterial pathogens of acute bronchitis and are also suspected in acute flareups of chronic bronchitis. Even though most acute infections of the upper and lower airways are caused in principle by viruses, bacterial infestation can occur in the further course of an airway infection, especially in cases of impaired mucociliary clearance.

In summary, the action of the ELOM-080 special distillate as an herbal active ingredient may be described by several effects. In this connection, special emphasis is to be placed on the various aspects acting toward enhancement of mucociliary clearance as well as on the anti-inflammatory and antimicrobial effects. Accordingly, the phytopharmaceutical is used primarily in airway diseases such as acute and chronic bronchitis as well as sinusitis.

=== Clinical Studies ===
ELOM-080 has been used for decades and has been tested in clinical studies. Randomised, double-blind, placebo-controlled multi-centre studies according to the international GCP standard (Good clinical practice) have been conducted, with the objective of proving the efficacy and tolerability according to the principles of evidence-based medicine. These clinical studies have been supplemented by non-interventional studies.

==== Acute sinusitis ====
A non-interventional study conducted in 2018 once again confirmed the efficacy of ELOM-080 in the treatment of acute rhinosinusitis. In total, 223 patients with diagnosed rhinosinusitis and aged between 18 and 86 years participated in the study. 114 patients were treated with ELOM-080 (GeloMyrtol® forte) by the attending doctors. All patients were observed over a period of at most 14 days, after which they described their symptoms associated with the acute rhinosinusitis (ARS) on a numerical scale. In addition, the tolerability was questioned, as was the assessment of the treating doctor as to efficacy and tolerability. In the ELOM-080 study arm, effective alleviation of facial pain, the key symptom of ARS, was observed almost immediately. This trend continued over the entire treatment period. Clear improvements were likewise found with respect to further symptoms, such as headaches, stuffy nose, pain in the nasal sinuses upon percussion and pressure sensitivity of the trigeminal nerve exit points. The patients were also satisfied with the improvement of their general feeling of illness. With respect to gastrointestinal tolerability for ELOM-080, the patients were found to be satisfied to very satisfied regardless of the time of ingestion of the medicine.

In a further double-blind, randomised and placebo-controlled study (RCT), ELOM-080 and an essential oil were administered to a total of 331 adults with acute nasal sinus inflammations (acute sinusitis) for approximately one week and compared with a sham preparation (placebo). To prevent distortions, neither the clinical investigators nor the patients knew what was being administered as the preparation in the individual case (double blinding), and the assignment to the three groups was based on the principle of chance (randomization). The comparison of the symptom total scores of the study participants revealed statistically significant superiority of the ELOM-080 active ingredient compared with the patients treated with the placebo. In other words, the patients recovered faster, especially in relation to the key symptoms of headaches, pain while bending over and sensitivity to pressure over the nasal sinuses. After this therapy phase, antibiotic treatments were needed much less often in the ELOM-080 group than in the placebo group (7% versus 13%).

==== Chronic sinusitis ====
In a study according to the international GCP standard (see above), 48 adults with chronic nasal sinus inflammation (chronic sinusitis) took either 300 mg capsules of ELOM-080 active ingredient or a sham preparation (placebo) three times per day for a total of three months. For all participants, computed tomographs (CTs) of the nasal sinuses had been recorded that confirmed the diagnosis and documented the course of the disease, especially by means of a CT score (Lund-Mackay score). Prior to the beginning of the treatment, this scope averaged approximately 9 points in both groups. After the end of the treatment, this point value was unchanged in the placebo group (no treatment effect). In contrast, in the study group treated with ELOM-080, the value was 41% lower (improvement), which is statistically significant. Both approximately 90% of the participating patients and the doctors certified the tolerability of ELOM-080 as good to very good.

==== Acute bronchitis ====
In a GCP-compliant multi-centre study on acute bronchitis, ELOM-080 was compared with an antibiotic, a chemical mucolytic and a sham preparation (placebo) over a period of 14 days. The 676 participants in total of the study were assigned by chance (randomisation) to the treatment groups. Neither clinical investigators nor patients knew with which alternative they were being treated (double blinding). After two weeks, ELOM-080 proved to be just as tolerable as placebo, but the action of the special distillate was statistically significantly superior. On the whole, the treatment effect was comparable with that of the antibiotic treatment. In several patients, a slight superiority compared with the antibiotic was found. However, because acute bronchitis is caused primarily by viruses, it is questionable whether antibiotic therapy is meaningful for this disease. Despite progress in the avoidance of unnecessary antibiotic prescriptions, antibiotics are still being prescribed too often, precisely for airway diseases.

A further randomised, double blind, placebo-controlled clinical study with 413 patients confirmed the good efficacy and tolerability of ELOM-080 in the treatment of acute bronchitis. Half of the patients suffered from severe or very severe coughing and 86% exhibited pathological findings by auscultation. The often nagging coughing experienced by bronchitis patients was quickly alleviated with ELOM-080. ELOM-080 reduced the number of coughing attacks after one week significantly more effectively than did the placebo treatment (62.1% vs. 49.8%). Moreover, the coughing frequency was significantly less under ELOM-080. Compared with the sham treatment, the patients had significantly less frequent problems of coughing up phlegm and sleep disturbances due to nocturnal coughing. In addition, the number of coughing-free patients at the end of the treatment was significantly higher under therapy with EOM-080. As regards adverse effects, there were no differences between the placebo and ELOM-080 groups.

==== Chronic bronchitis ====
In a randomised, double-blind, placebo-controlled study with 246 patients with chronic bronchitis, the long-term treatment over 6 months with ELOM-080 was investigated in comparison with placebo. In the process, ELOM-080 proved to be superior to placebo as regards effect: The intensity and frequency of acute deteriorations (exacerbations) of the chronic bronchitis were reduced statistically significantly and to a relevant extent with ELOM-080. By virtue of the treatment, an exacerbation peak that is typical of the season for the placebo group between the 2nd and 4th treatment month (usually December to February) did not occur in the ELOM-080 group. The quality of life of the patients, assessed according to their general condition and their impairment by coughing and sputum expectoration, was statistically significantly improved by the therapy with ELOM-080. Moreover, the need for antibiotics was clearly reduced under ELOM-080 in comparison with the sham treatment. In the process, ELOM-080 proved just as tolerable as placebo. The study has been considered by the Cochrane Airways Group in their annual review of the theme of mucolytics vs. placebo in chronic bronchitis and COPD.

In a post-hoc analysis of the study, patients with chronic bronchitis and simultaneously suffering from COPD (chronic obstructive pulmonary disease) were investigated. 64 patients met this criterion. Even for those patients with COPD, ELOM-080 reduced the number of exacerbations during the winter season. The number of patients with at least one exacerbation was statistically significantly smaller than under the sham treatment (29% vs. 55%). The patients felt much less impaired by coughing and sputum under the therapy with ELOM-080, and they evaluated their state of health more often as good or very good in comparison with a sham therapy. In this connection, both treatments had comparable tolerability.

In summary, ELOM-080 enjoys acknowledged proof of action for both acute and chronic infections of the upper and lower airways.

== Guideline recommendations ==
On the basis of the scientific literature, 4 professional medical societies recommend the use of ELOM-080 for treatment of sinusitis and coughing.

== Trade names ==
- GeloMyrtol® forte (DE) is a registered trade mark used to designate an herbal medicinal product to combat acute and chronic bronchitis and sinusitis. The finished medicinal product contains 300 mg of ELOM-080 active ingredient. Smaller capsules with an active ingredient content of 120 mg contain the medicinal product Myrtol® for administration to children from the age 6 years on.
- GeloMyrtol® forte 300mg (AT)
- GeloDurat (CH)

== Literature ==
- Volker Schulz, Rudolf Hänsel, Mark Blumenthal, V. E. Tyler: Rational Phytotherapy. 5th ed., Springer, 2004, ISBN 978-3-540-40832-1, pp. 207–208; 5th German edition, 2004, ISBN 3-540-00983-3, pp. 222–223.
- Thomas Wittig: GeloMyrtol forte standardised – A clinical documentation. 4th edition, 2005, Ergebnisse-Verlag, ISBN 978-3-87916-067-9
