= Orange oil tires =

Rubber tyres manufactured by Yokohama Rubber Company

Orange oil tires (tyres in Commonwealth English) replace a small amount of petroleum in the tire tread with oil made from the orange fruit. This increases tire performance, and offers green marketing. Since 2008 the technology has been used exclusively by the Yokohama Rubber Company.

== Attributes ==
Orange oil is used for its limonene compound. Combined with natural rubber and silica, orange oil creates a compound labelled "Super Nano-Power Rubber Compound (SNPR)" by Yokohama. In all-season tires orange oil is used for longer tread life, better fuel economy and traction. The temperature of the tire in normal conditions and constant velocity keeps the orange oil in a more viscous state, while the increase in temperature associated with cornering, braking and acceleration causes the orange oil to become sticker, having better traction. For racing tires orange oil technology allows the tires to maintain a consistent level of stickiness over more laps, causing the breakaway to be more predictable. Micro-flexibility between the road and the tread is improved due to the orange oil. Lower rolling resistance in orange oil tires results in longer tread life and better fuel economy. Stiffer tread elements used to extend tread life can be used without compromising tire grip because of orange oil.

== Ecological impact ==
The BluEarth-1 was featured in the Museum of Science's "Making a Greener Tire" exhibit, displaying the orange oil technology. Yokohama does not disclose how much orange oil is used in making the tire but one engineer is quoted as saying “a percent, of a percent, of a percent” by Popular Mechanics. The largest environmental impact does not come from the orange oil reducing the use of petroleum, but the increase in tire life and fuel efficiency.

== Applications ==
- dB Super E-Spec
- ENV-R1
- ENV-R2
- AVID Ascend line
- BluEarth-1
