= Limonene 1,2-monooxygenase =

Class of enzymes

Identifiers
- EC no.: 1.14.13.107

Databases
- IntEnz: IntEnz view
- BRENDA: BRENDA entry
- ExPASy: NiceZyme view
- KEGG: KEGG entry
- MetaCyc: metabolic pathway
- PRIAM: profile
- PDB structures: RCSB PDB PDBe PDBsum
Search
- PMC: articles
- PubMed: articles
- NCBI: proteins

Limonene 1,2-monooxygenase (EC 1.14.13.107) is an enzyme with systematic name limonene,NAD(P)H:oxygen oxidoreductase. This enzyme catalyses the following chemical reaction

(1) (S)-limonene + NAD(P)H + H^{+} + O_{2} $\rightleftharpoons$ 1,2-epoxymenth-8-ene + NAD(P)^{+} + H_{2}O
(2) (R)-limonene + NAD(P)H + H^{+} + O_{2} $\rightleftharpoons$ 1,2-epoxymenth-8-ene + NAD(P)^{+} + H_{2}O

Limonene 1,2-monooxygenase flavoprotein (FAD).
