= Perillartine =

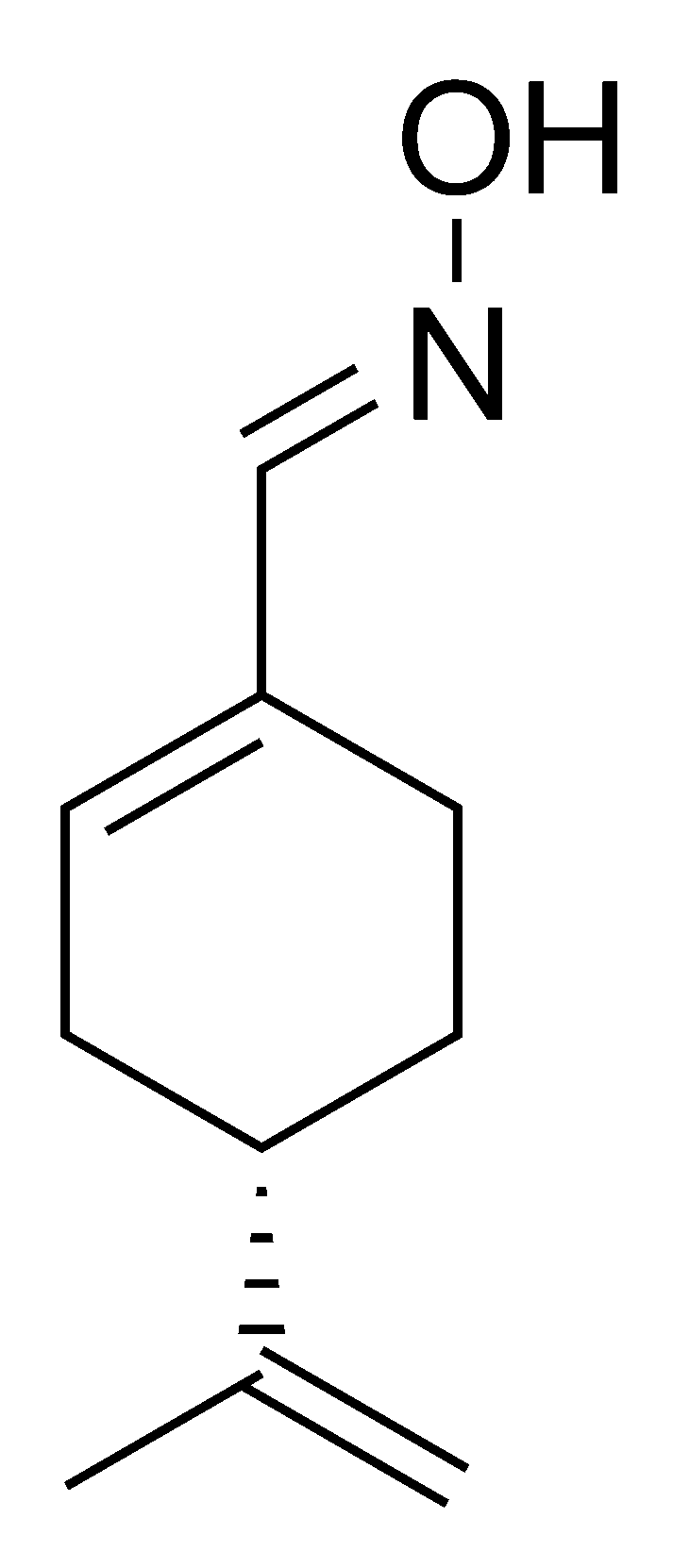
Skeletal formula
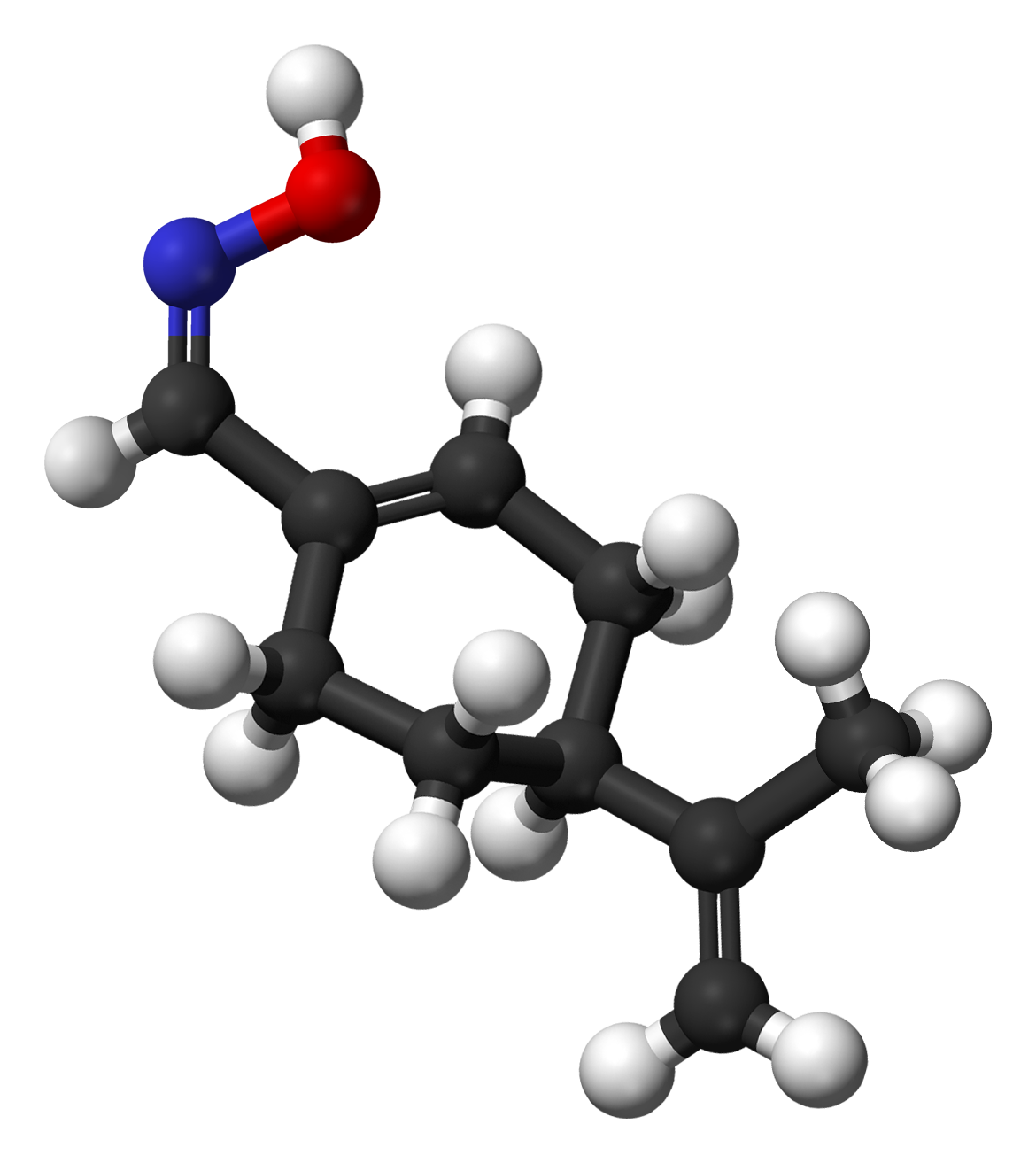
Ball-and-stick model

Names
- IUPAC name (S)-4-(Prop-1-en-2-yl)cyclohex-1-ene- carbaldehyde oxime

Identifiers
CAS Number	30950-27-7
3D model (JSmol)	Interactive image
ChemSpider	4517728
ECHA InfoCard	100.045.806
PubChem CID	5365782
UNII	46S302515I
CompTox Dashboard (EPA)	DTXSID701014887
- InChI: InChI=1S/C10H15NO/c1-8(2)10-5-3-9(4-6-10)7-11-12/h3,7,10,12H,1,4-6H2,2H3/b11-7+ Key: XCOJIVIDDFTHGB-YRNVUSSQSA-N; InChI=1/C10H15NO/c1-8(2)10-5-3-9(4-6-10)7-11-12/h3,7,10,12H,1,4-6H2,2H3/b11-7+ Key: XCOJIVIDDFTHGB-YRNVUSSQBY
- SMILES: CC([C@H]1CCC(/C=N/O)=CC1)=C

Properties
Chemical formula	C_{10}H_{15}NO
Molar mass	165.23 g/mol
- Except where otherwise noted, data are given for materials in their standard state (at 25 °C [77 °F], 100 kPa). verify (what is ?) Infobox references

Perillartine, also known as perillartin and perilla sugar, is a semisynthetic sweetener that is about 2000 times as sweet as sucrose. It is mainly used in Japan. Perillartine is the oxime of perillaldehyde, which is extracted from plants of the genus Perilla (Lamiaceae).

== See also ==
- Sweetener
- Oxime
- Perilla
- Shiso
- Oxime V
