= Perillyl alcohol =

(R)-(+)-Perillyl alcohol
(S)-(-)-Perillyl alcohol

Names
- IUPAC name (4-Isopropenyl-1-cyclohexen-1-yl)methanol

Identifiers
CAS Number	536-59-4
3D model (JSmol)	Interactive image
ChemSpider	10362
ECHA InfoCard	100.007.856
PubChem CID	10819
UNII	319R5C7293
CompTox Dashboard (EPA)	DTXSID4052180
- InChI: InChI=1S/C10H16O/c1-8(2)10-5-3-9(7-11)4-6-10/h3,10-11H,1,4-7H2,2H3 Key: NDTYTMIUWGWIMO-UHFFFAOYSA-N; InChI=1/C10H16O/c1-8(2)10-5-3-9(7-11)4-6-10/h3,10-11H,1,4-7H2,2H3 Key: NDTYTMIUWGWIMO-UHFFFAOYAB
- SMILES: CC(=C)C1CCC(=CC1)CO

Properties
Chemical formula	C_{10}H_{16}O
Molar mass	152.237 g·mol^{−1}
- Except where otherwise noted, data are given for materials in their standard state (at 25 °C [77 °F], 100 kPa). Infobox references

Perillyl alcohol and its precursor limonene are naturally occurring monocyclic terpenes derived from the mevalonate pathway in plants. Perillyl alcohol can be found in the essential oils of various plants, such as lavender, lemongrass, sage, and peppermint. It has a number of manufacturing, household, and medical applications. For example, perillyl alcohol may be used as an ingredient in cleaning products and cosmetics.

Perillyl alcohol has shown some antitumor activity in laboratory and animal studies. Perillyl Alcohol decrease production of proangiogenic growth factors VEGF and interleukin-8 (IL-8) in vitro.

Mammals possess enzymes (P450, liver) to convert limonene to perillyl alcohol. Limonene is formed from geranyl pyrophosphate in the mevalonate pathway. Conversion of limonene to perillyl alcohol is done via hydroxylation by enzymes that belong to the superfamily of cytochrome P450 proteins. Perillyl alcohol can be further converted to perillaldehyde (perillyl aldehyde) and perillic acid.

The name comes from the herb perilla.

== See also ==
- Perillaldehyde
- Limonene
