= Earthen floor =

Floor made of unworked ground materials

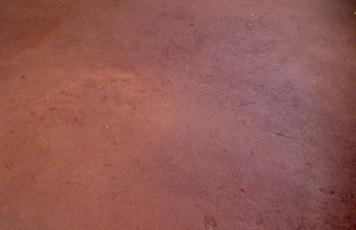
An earthen floor

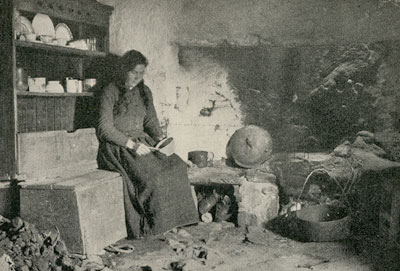
Interior of a peasant cottage in Ireland, 1897, featuring a dirt floor. Photo by Clifton Johnson.

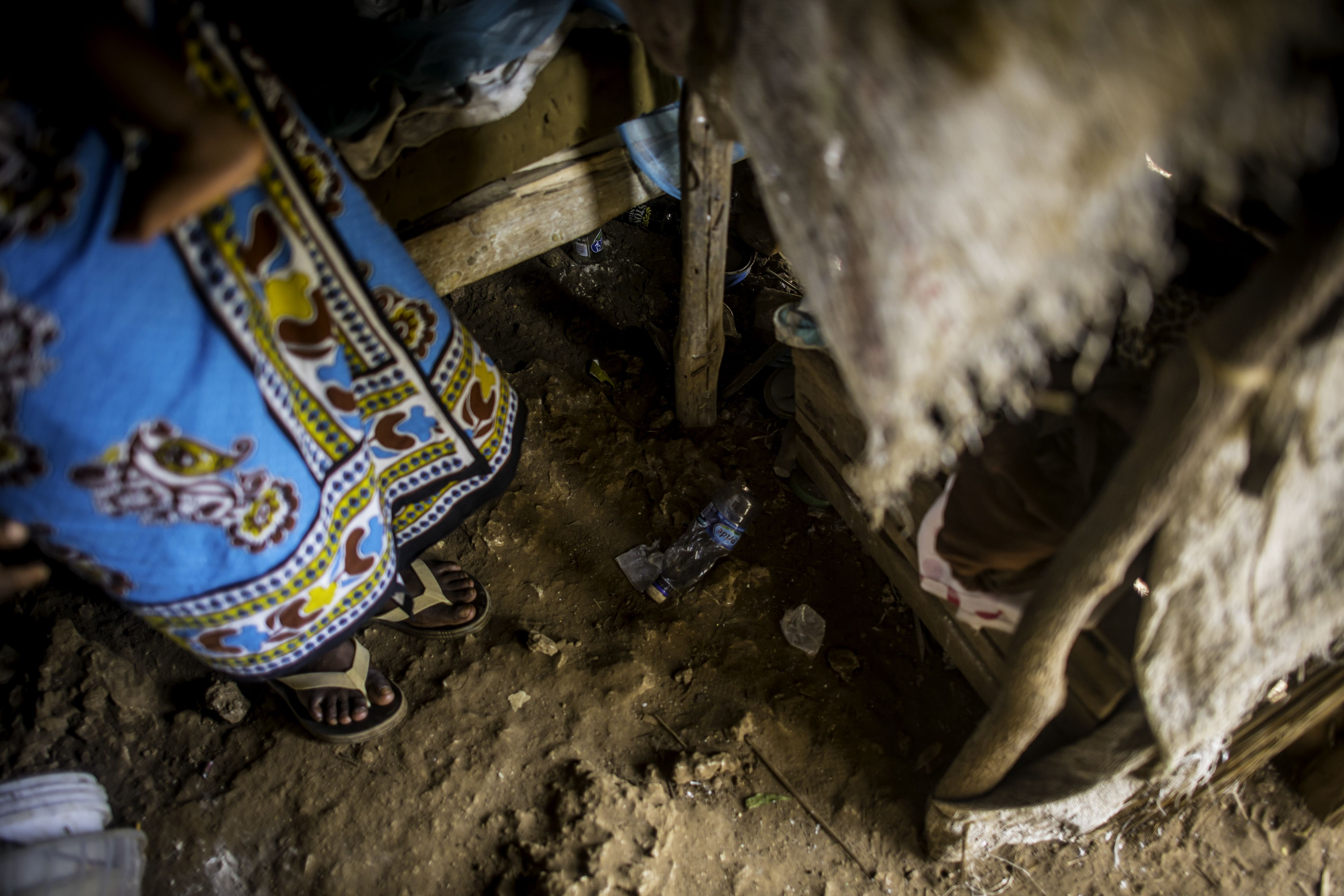
A dirt floor in a home in Kenya, circa 2019.

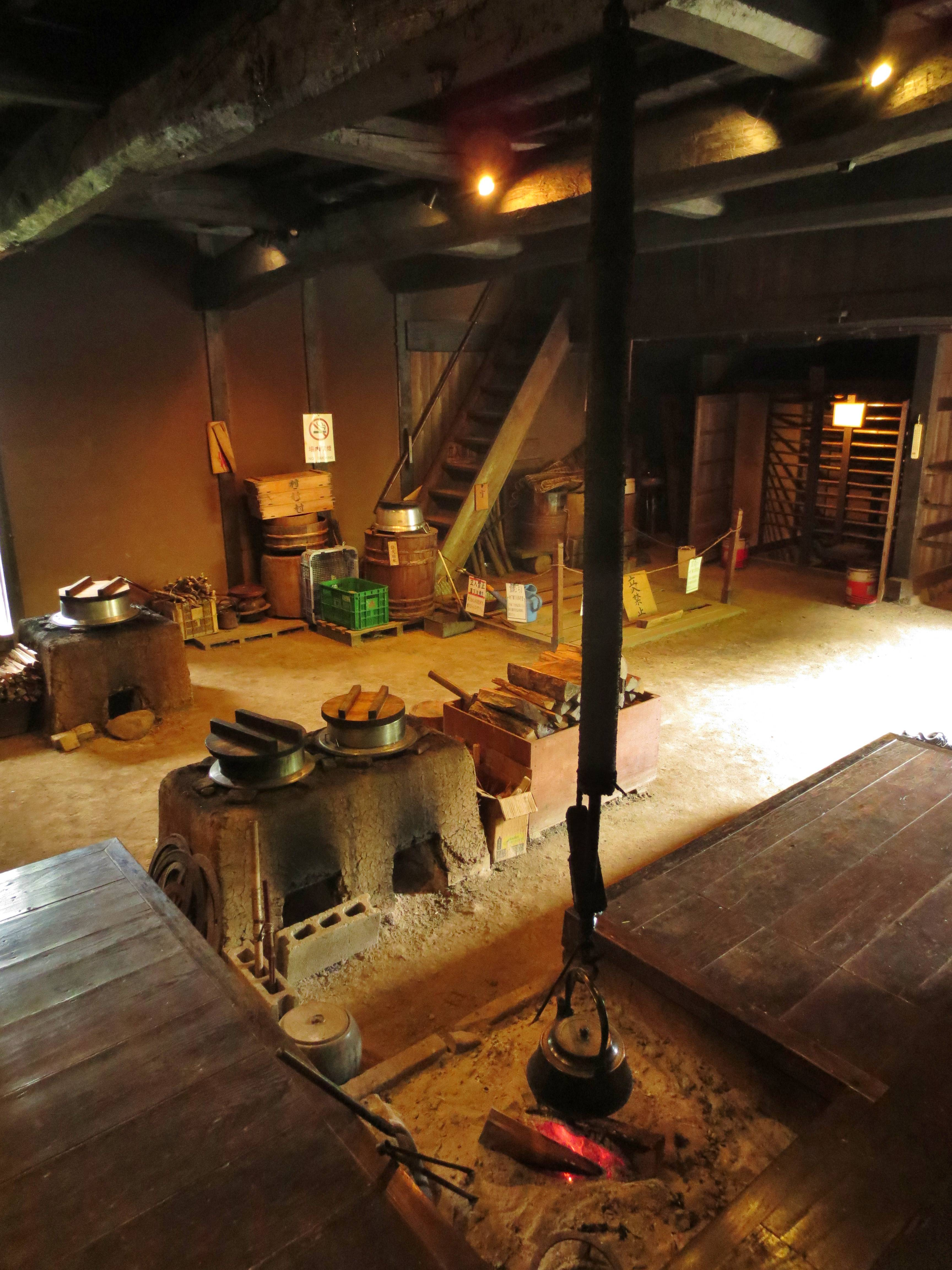
Earthen floor in the historic Suzuki house (Nagno Magariya) in Numata City, completed in 1785.

An earthen floor or dirt floor, also called an adobe floor, is a floor made of dirt, raw earth, or other unworked ground materials. It is usually constructed, in modern times, with a mixture of sand, finely chopped straw and clay, mixed to a thickened consistency and spread with a trowel on a sub-surface such as concrete. Once dry, it is then usually saturated with several treatments of a drying oil.

== History ==
Earthen floors were predominant in most houses until the mid 14th century in Europe, and persist to this day in many parts of the world. In medieval times, almost all peasant housing had earthen floors, usually of hardpacked dirt topped off with a thin layer of straw for warmth and comfort.

In China, most cottages and smaller houses also had earthen floors, made of rammed earth and sealed with raw linseed. Earthen floors were used in ancient Greece, and in many other countries in ancient times. Earthen floors, along with stone and sometimes wood, were used as threshing floors.

== Benefits ==
- Variety of colors, textures, and materials
- Can be installed over nearly any subflooring
- Integrates well with in-floor radiant heat tubing
- One of the cheapest flooring methods, green or otherwise

== Construction ==
In modern times, most earthen floors are often laid over the top of a subfloor of tamped gravel or cob or adobe, and then a mixture of clay, sand and fiber are mixed and leveled onto the subfloor. The finished layer can be 1/2 to 2 inches thick, and once dry is sealed with a drying oil (like linseed oil). Earthen floors can be laid over the top of previously installed wood floors but weight can become an issue.

== Finishing ==
A drying oil like linseed oil is usually used to seal the floor and protect it from wear and tear. A final coat of a wax sealing finish (perilla oil or floor wax) can be used to increase durability and lustre.
