= Perillaldehyde =

Skeletal formula of perillaldehyde
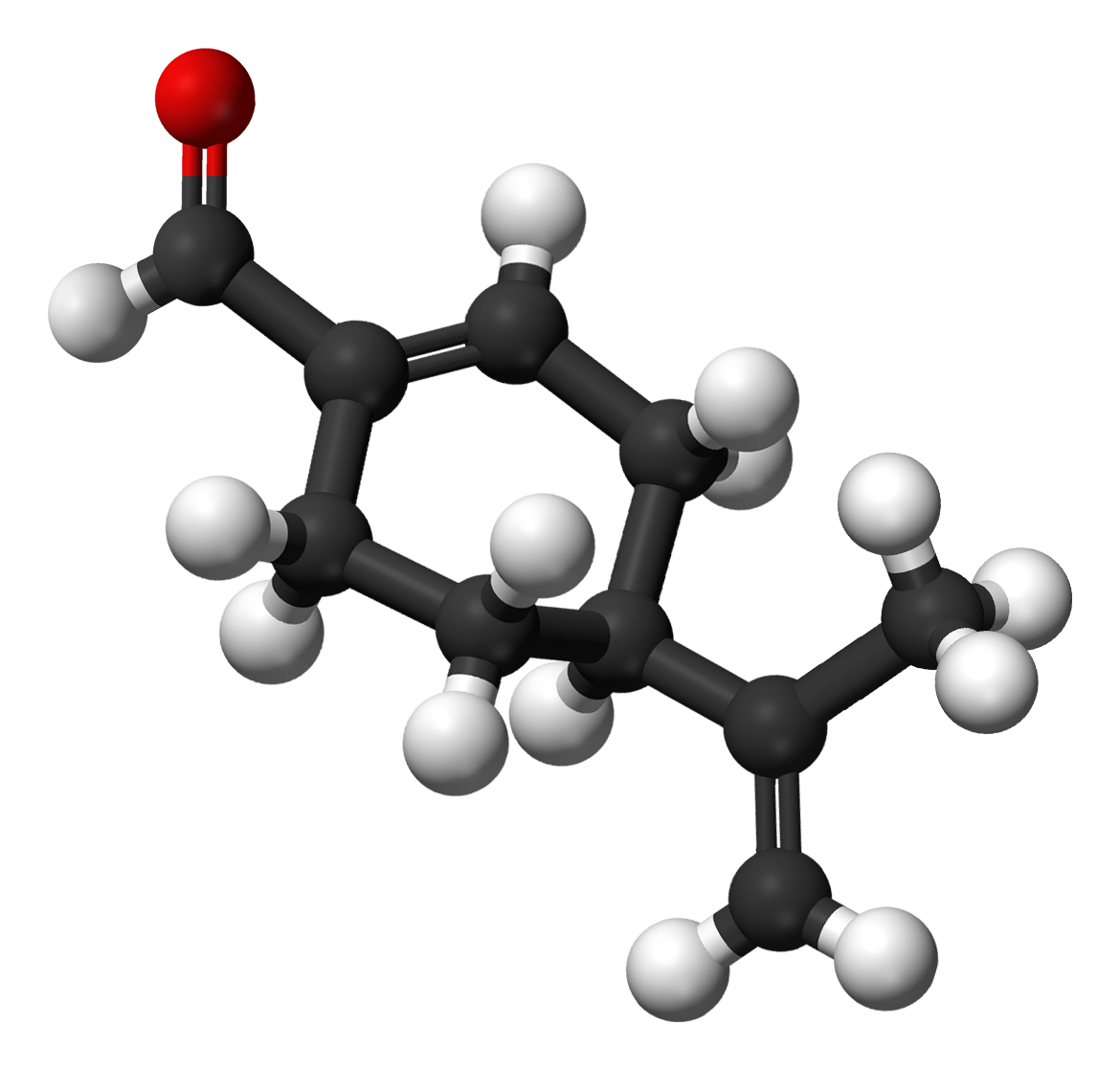
Ball-and-stick model of perillaldehyde

Names
- IUPAC name (S)-4-(1-Methylethenyl)-1-cyclohexene-1-carboxaldehyde
- Other names Perilla aldehyde; 4-Mentha-1,8-dien-7-al

Identifiers
CAS Number	18031-40-8
3D model (JSmol)	Interactive image
ChEBI	CHEBI:15421
ChEMBL	ChEMBL469537
ChemSpider	15589
ECHA InfoCard	100.016.639
KEGG	C02576
PubChem CID	16441
UNII	5EL0Y7P6LP
CompTox Dashboard (EPA)	DTXSID6051855
- InChI: InChI=1S/C10H14O/c1-8(2)10-5-3-9(7-11)4-6-10/h3,7,10H,1,4-6H2,2H3 Key: RUMOYJJNUMEFDD-UHFFFAOYSA-N; InChI=1/C10H14O/c1-8(2)10-5-3-9(7-11)4-6-10/h3,7,10H,1,4-6H2,2H3 Key: RUMOYJJNUMEFDD-UHFFFAOYAO
- SMILES: O=C\C1=C\CC(\C(=C)C)CC1

Properties
Chemical formula	C_{10}H_{14}O
Molar mass	150.221 g·mol^{−1}
Appearance	Colorless liquid
Density	0.953 g/mL (20 °C)
Boiling point	237 °C (459 °F; 510 K) (745 mmHg)
- Except where otherwise noted, data are given for materials in their standard state (at 25 °C [77 °F], 100 kPa). Infobox references

Perillaldehyde, perillic aldehyde or perilla aldehyde, is a natural organic compound found most abundantly in the annual herb perilla, but also in a wide variety of other plants and essential oils. It is a monoterpenoid containing an aldehyde functional group.

Perillaldehyde, or volatile oils from perilla that are rich in perillaldehyde, are used as food additives for flavoring and in perfumery to add spiciness. Perillaldehyde can be readily converted to perilla alcohol, which is also used in perfumery. It has a mint-like, cinnamon odor and is primarily responsible for the flavor of perilla.

The oxime of perillaldehyde is known as perillartine or perilla sugar and is about 2000 times sweeter than sucrose and is used in Japan as a sweetener. It is presented in lower concentrations in the body odor of persons suffering from Parkinson's disease.

== Biosynthesis ==
In Perilla frutescens, the monoterpene, (S)-limonene, undergoes two oxidation steps. The enzyme (S)-limonene 7-monooxygenase gives (–)-perillyl alcohol and perillyl-alcohol dehydrogenase converts this to perillaldehyde.

(S)-limonene
(–)-perillyl alcohol
(–)-perillaldehyde

== See also ==
- Icosane
