= Hydroxynorephedrine =

Hydroxynorephedrine may refer to:

- meta-Hydroxynorephedrine
- para-Hydroxynorephedrine
