= Parilla =

Parilla may refer to:

- Parilla, South Australia, a small town on the Mallee Highway in South Australia
- Hundred of Parilla, an administrative division in South Australia
- Parilla (motorcycle manufacturer), an Italian brand 1946-1965
- A brand name belonging to kart engine maker Italian American Motor Engineering
- Yellow parilla (Menispermum canadense), a flowering plant
- Jennifer Parilla (born 1981), American trampolinist
- Parilla, a form of torture involving electrical injury

== See also ==
- Parrilla (disambiguation)
- Perilla (disambiguation)
