= Adhesive remover =

Cleaning product for dissolving unwanted adhesives

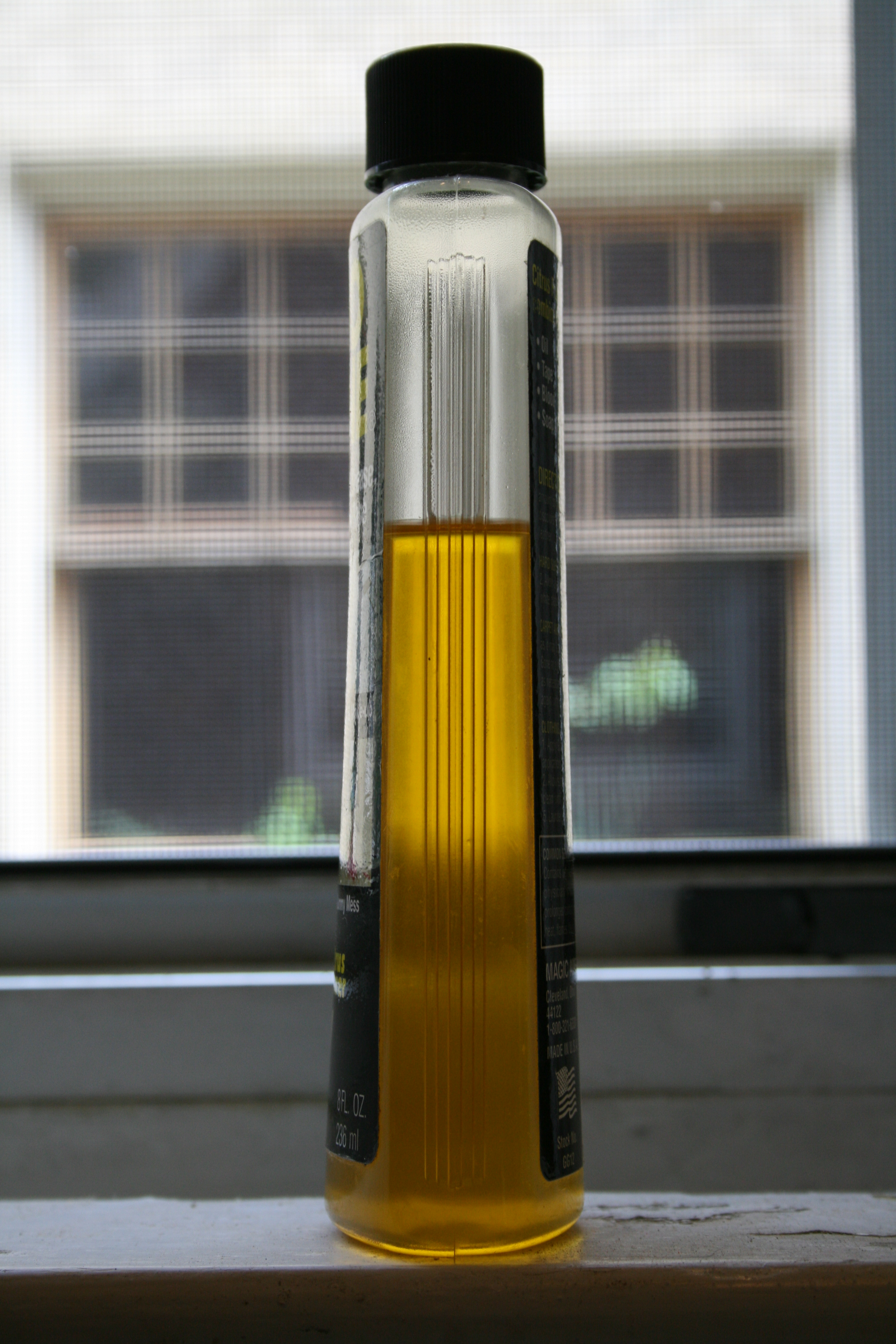
Goo Gone solvent

Adhesive remover is a substance intended to break down and remove glue and its remnants from surfaces.

== Description ==
Adhesive removers are intended to break down glue so that it can be removed from surfaces easily. Formulations may be designed to remove a broad range of adhesives or to address a specific bond. Many general purpose removers are intended to remove residue from adhesive tape.

== Formulations ==
Adhesive removers are often based on organic solvents, which can dissolve or soften many adhesive polymers that do not dissolve in water. They may also contain a gelling agent, increasing viscosity so that the product sticks to the area to be treated rather than running off. Common solvents used include D-limonene, aliphatic alkanes, and acetone.

Heptane is also used as an adhesive remover by stamp collectors. Since 1974, the United States Postal Service has issued self-adhesive stamps that some collectors find difficult to remove from envelopes via the traditional method of soaking in water. Heptane-based products, like Bestine, as well as limonene-based products, have become popular solvents for removing stamps more easily.
