= 1C-H =

Clinical data
- Trade names: Zilain
- Drug class: uterotonic
- ATC code: none

Identifiers
- IUPAC name: (2,5-dimethoxyphenyl)methanamine
- CAS Number: 3275-95-4
- ChemSpider: 17612
- CompTox Dashboard (EPA): DTXSID10186420
- ECHA InfoCard: 100.156.586

Chemical and physical data
- 3D model (JSmol): Interactive image
- SMILES: COc1ccc(OC)c(CN)c1
- InChI: InChI=1S/C9H13NO2/c1-11-8-3-4-9(12-2)7(5-8)6-10/h3-5H,6,10H2,1-2H3; Key:UWMCHDDHXMFKMA-UHFFFAOYSA-N

2,5-Dimethoxybenzylamine (1C-H) also known under the putative brand name Zilain, is a drug that was intended for use in obstetrics; it was developed by Soviet scientists in the 1970s.

== Use ==
1C-H
Properties
Chemical formula	C_{9}H_{13}NO_{2}
Molar mass	167.208 g·mol^{−1}
Appearance	clear liquid, colorless to light orange to yellow
Density	1.11
Boiling point	95 °C

Hazards
- GHS labelling
Pictograms	(GHS05: Corrosive)
Signal word	Danger
Hazard statements	H300, H330
Precautionary statements	P280, P303+P361+P353, P304+P340+P310, P305+P351+P338, P363, P405
- Except where otherwise noted, data are given for materials in their standard state (at 25 °C [77 °F], 100 kPa). Infobox references

=== Pharmacology ===
Little is known about the biological activity of 2,5-dimethoxybenzylamine, but it is known to stimulate uterine contractions.

=== Synthesis ===
2,5-Dimethoxybenzylamine reacts with ethyl bromoacetate to form the ethyl ester of N-(2,5-dimethoxy)benzylglycine; 1C-H is also used in the synthesis of pyrrolo[2,3-b]pyrazine-7-carboxamide derivatives.

To obtain 1C-H, a Delépine reaction is used to alkylate hexamethylenetetramine with 2,5-dimethoxybenzyl bromide, followed by acid hydrolysis of the resulting quaternary ammonium salt, and finally neutralization with a base.
