= Oxime V =

Names
- IUPAC name 4-(Methoxymethyl)-1,4-cyclohexadiene-1-carboxaldehyde syn-oxime

Identifiers
CAS Number	59691-20-2
3D model (JSmol)	Interactive image
ChEMBL	ChEMBL280369
ChemSpider	7851769
PubChem CID	9577332
- InChI: InChI=1S/C9H13NO2/c1-12-7-9-4-2-8(3-5-9)6-10-11/h2,5-6,11H,3-4,7H2,1H3/b10-6+ Key: LNTHQBNSXNQPPZ-UXBLZVDNSA-N
- SMILES: C(=N/O)\C=1CC=C(COC)CC1

Properties
Chemical formula	C_{9}H_{13}NO_{2}
Molar mass	167.208 g·mol^{−1}
- Except where otherwise noted, data are given for materials in their standard state (at 25 °C [77 °F], 100 kPa). Infobox references

Oxime V is a chemical compound that has been studied as a potential sweetener. Oxime V was first reported in 1976 as a synthetic analog of the semisynthetic sugar substitute perillartine. It is about 450 times as sweet as sucrose and is more water-soluble than perillartine. Its metabolism and toxicology have been investigated, and it has been found to have promising properties, but it is not currently marketed.

In 2022, oxime V was identified in citrus.
