= La Parrilla =

La Parrilla, Spain
- Coat of arms

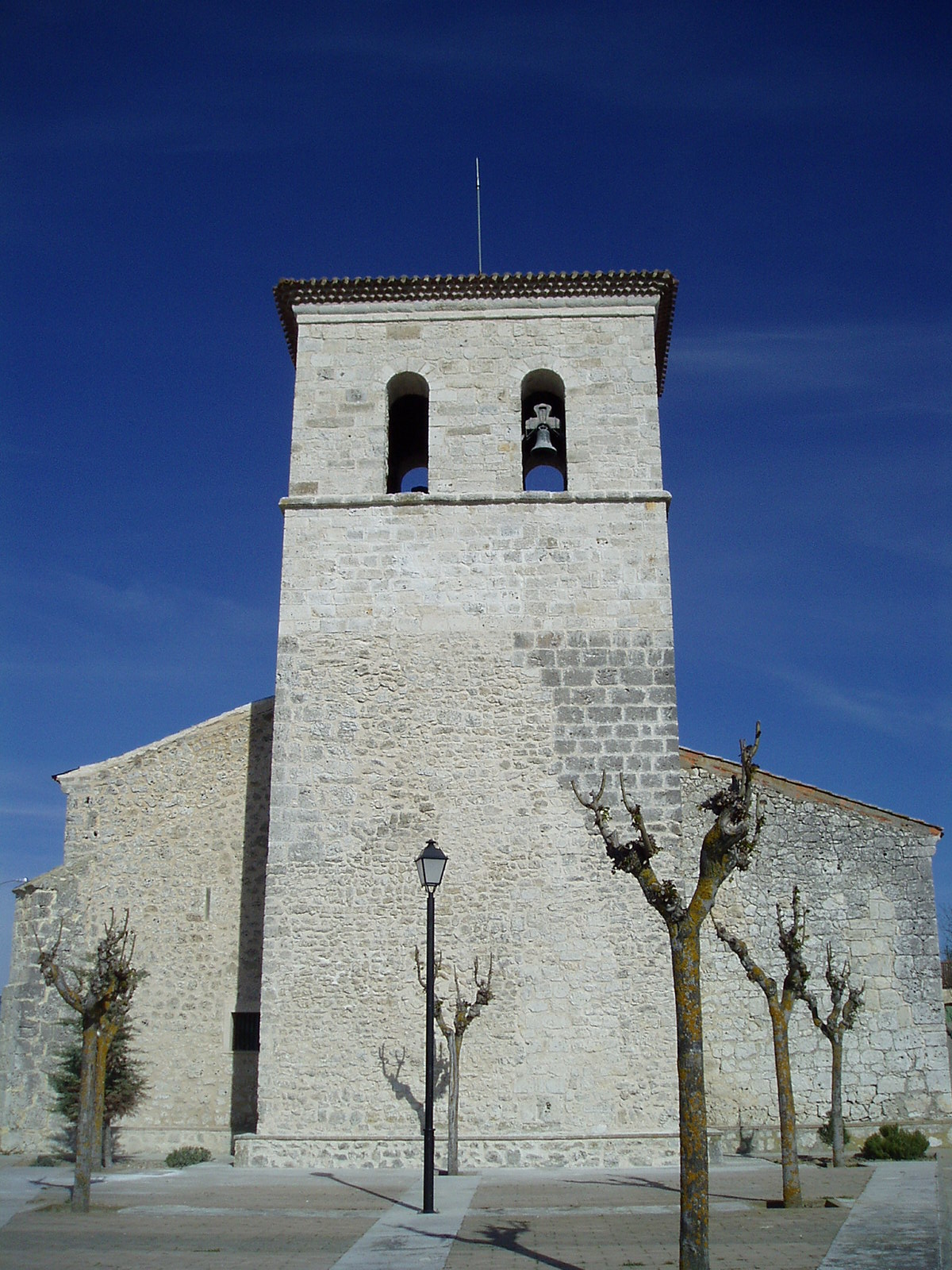
- Church
- Coordinates: 41.5333°N 4.5333°W
- Country: Spain
- Autonomous community: Castile and León
- Province: Valladolid
- Municipality: La Parrilla

Area
  - Total: 45 km^{2} (17 sq mi)

Population (2025-01-01)
  - Total: 471
  - Density: 10/km^{2} (27/sq mi)
- Time zone: UTC+1 (CET)
  - Summer (DST): UTC+2 (CEST)

La Parrilla is a municipality located in the province of Valladolid, Castile and León, Spain. According to the 2004 census (INE), the municipality has a population of 622 inhabitants.
