= La Parrilla mine =

Tungsten mine in Spain

- Location: Province of Valladolid, Spain
- Products: tungsten

The La Parrilla mine is a large mine located in the north-western part of Spain in Province of Valladolid. La Parrilla represents one of the largest tungsten reserves in Spain having estimated reserves of 30 million tonnes of ore grading 0.11% tungsten.
