= Orange oil =

Essential oil produced in rind of oranges

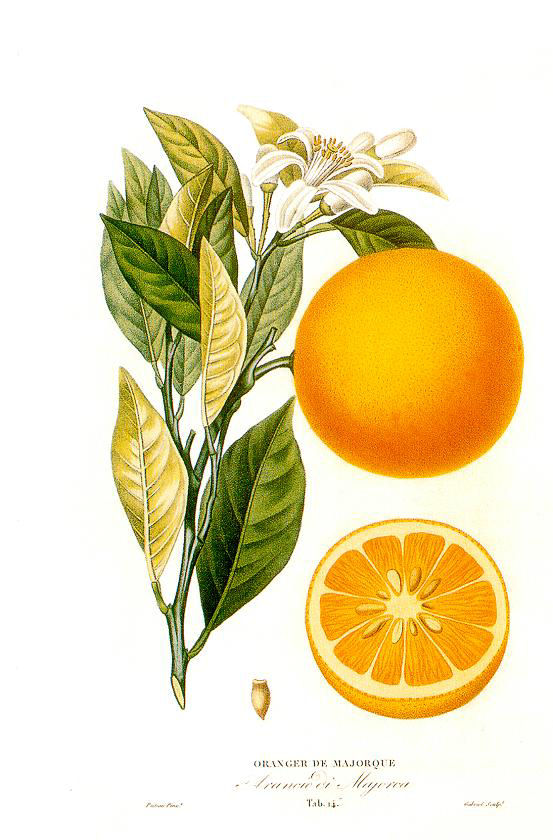
Citrus sinensis (L.) Histoire et culture des orangers A. Risso et A. Poiteau. – Paris Henri Plon, Editeur, 1872

Orange oil is an essential oil produced by cells within the rind of an orange fruit (Citrus sinensis fruit). In contrast to most essential oils, it is extracted as a by-product of orange juice production by centrifugation, producing a cold-pressed oil. It is composed of mostly (greater than 90%) d-limonene, and is often used in place of pure d-limonene. D-limonene can be extracted from the oil by distillation.

== Composition ==
The compounds inside an orange oil vary with each different oil extraction. Composition varies as a result of regional and seasonal changes as well as the method used for extraction. Several hundred compounds have been identified with gas chromatograph-mass spectrometry. Most of the substances in the oil belong to the terpene group with limonene being the dominant one. Long chain aliphatic hydrocarbon alcohols and aldehydes like 1-octanol and octanal are second important group of substances. The presence of sinensetin, a flavone, explains the orange color.

Compound	Italian Orange Oil Concentration [%]	Valencia orange oil Concentration [%]	Valencia orange oil Concentration [%]	Valencia orange oil Concentration [%]
Limonene	93.67	91.4	95.17	97.0
α-Pinene	0.65	1.4	0.42	–
Sabinene and β-Pinene	1.00	0.4	0.24	–
Myrcene	2.09	4.3	1.86	0.03
Octanal	0.41	–	-	–
Linalool	0.31	0.8	0.25	0.3
δ-3-Carene	0.31	–	–	–
Decanal	0.27	0.4	0.28	–

== Uses ==
=== Insect control ===
Orange oil, particularly its primary component d-limonene, is registered with the EPA as an active ingredient in products for the extermination of drywood termites, Formosan termites, and other structural pests. It is a common alternative to traditional fumigation methods due to its lower toxicity and the convenience of local chemical injections. Orange oil treatments can be used for termite control.

Orange oil is used as a green pesticide for biological pest control, as it is effective against ants and other insects by disrupting their scent-pheromone trails or dissolving their exoskeletons, thereby preventing infestations.

=== Domestic cleaning agent ===
Due to its high limonene content, orange oil is commonly used in cleaning products as a natural solvent. It is also added to furniture polishes to impart a fresh, citrus aroma.

== Hazards ==
As a main component of orange oil, limonene can dissolve skin oils, potentially causing irritation. This is especially a concern with long-term industrial exposure, such as during the preparation of paints or degreasing processes. Limonene in orange oil is also flammable, and can be an irritant if ingested, inhaled, or if it comes into contact with the eyes. Some individuals may also experience allergic reactions.

== See also ==
- Neroli
- Petitgrain
- Orange oil tires
