= Metaraminol =

Antihypotensive medication

Clinical data
- Trade names: Aramine, Metaramin, Pressonex, others
- Other names: Metaradrine; Hydroxynorephedrine; m-Hydroxypropadrine; m-Hydroxynorephedrine; meta-Hydroxynorephedrine; 3-Hydroxyphenylisopropanolamine; (1R,2S)-3,β-Dihydroxy-α-methylphenethylamine; (1R,2S)-3,β-Dihydroxyamphetamine
- AHFS/Drugs.com: International Drug Names
- License data: US DailyMed: Metaraminol
- Pregnancy category: AU: C
- Routes of administration: Intramuscular injection, intravenous administration
- Drug class: Norepinephrine releasing agent; Adrenergic receptor agonist; Sympathomimetic; Antihypotensive
- ATC code: C01CA09 (WHO)

Legal status
- Legal status: AU: S4 (Prescription only); UK: POM (Prescription only); US: ℞-only

Pharmacokinetic data
- Protein binding: 45%
- Metabolism: Liver

Identifiers
- IUPAC name: (1R,2S)-3-[-2-amino-1-hydroxy-propyl]phenol
- CAS Number: 54-49-9 33402-03-8 (bitartrate)
- PubChem CID: 5906
- IUPHAR/BPS: 7229
- DrugBank: DB00610
- ChemSpider: 5695
- UNII: 818U2PZ2EH
- KEGG: D08192
- ChEBI: CHEBI:6794
- ChEMBL: ChEMBL1201319
- CompTox Dashboard (EPA): DTXSID8023268

Chemical and physical data
- Formula: C_{9}H_{13}NO_{2}
- Molar mass: 167.208 g·mol^{−1}
- 3D model (JSmol): Interactive image
- SMILES: O[C@H](c1cc(O)ccc1)[C@@H](N)C
- InChI: InChI=1S/C9H13NO2/c1-6(10)9(12)7-3-2-4-8(11)5-7/h2-6,9,11-12H,10H2,1H3/t6-,9-/m0/s1; Key:WXFIGDLSSYIKKV-RCOVLWMOSA-N

Metaraminol, also known as metaradrine and sold under the brand name Aramine among others, is a sympathomimetic medication which is used in the prevention and treatment of hypotension (low blood pressure), particularly as a complication of anesthesia. It is given by intramuscular or intravenous administration.

Side effects of metaraminol include reflex bradycardia among others. Metaraminol is a norepinephrine releasing agent and at high doses a α_{1}-adrenergic receptor agonist with some β-adrenergic effect. It is a substituted amphetamine and is closely related to phenylpropanolamine, ephedrine, and oxilofrine.

Metaraminol was approved for medical use in the United States in September 1954.

== Medical uses ==
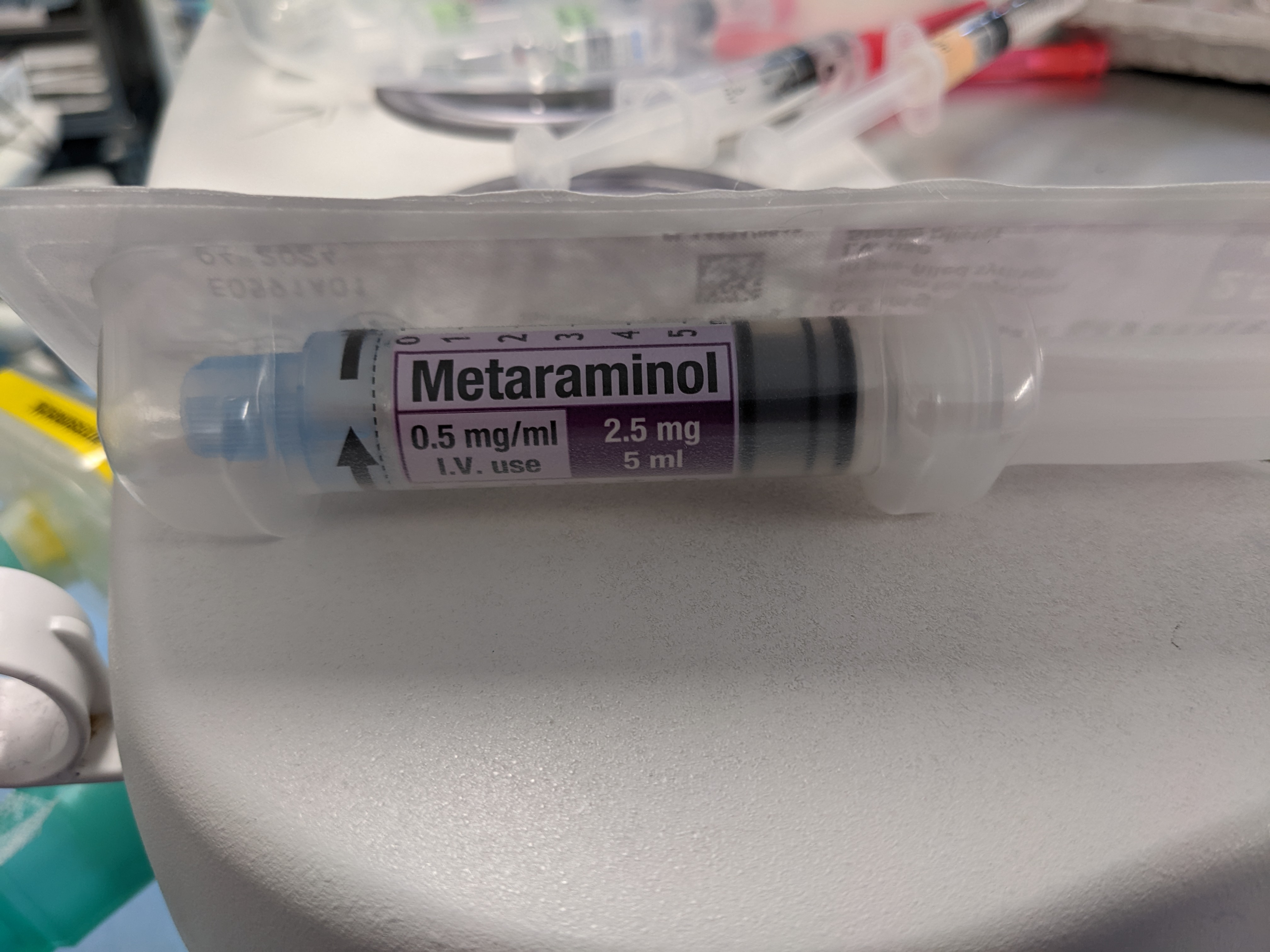
A commercially prepared pre-filled syringe of metaraminol for bolus use during anaesthesia, made up as 0.5 mg/mL (2.5 mg in 5 mL).

Metaraminol is given intravenously as either a bolus (often 0.5–1 mg doses) or as an infusion, usually via peripheral intravenous access. Metaraminol is commonly available as 10 mg in 1 mL, that requires dilution prior to administration (often made up to a 0.5 mg/mL solution), however pre-prepared syringes of metaraminol for bolus use for hypotension are also commonly available.

Metaraminol is also used in the treatment of priapism.

== Pharmacology ==
=== Pharmacodynamics ===
The dominant mechanism of action for the vasopressor action of metaraminol is indirect, with metaraminol displacing norepinephrine from neuronal vesicles in order for the noradrenaline to exert these effects. Metaraminol at higher doses may have direct α-adrenergic agonist and β_{1}-adrenergic agonist effects. However at doses common in clinical practice, the indirect α_{1}-adrenergic effects predominate, such that reflex bradycardia is a common side effect.

== Chemistry ==
Metaraminol, also known as (1R,2S)-3,β-dihydroxy-α-methylphenethylamine or as (1R,2S)-3,β-dihydroxyamphetamine, is a substituted phenethylamine and amphetamine derivative. It is the (1R,2S)-enantiomer of meta-hydroxynorephedrine (3,β-dihydroxyamphetamine). The drug is closely related to phenylpropanolamine ((1RS,2SR)-β-hydroxyamphetamine; norephedrine), ephedrine ((1R,2S)-β-hydroxy-N-methylamphetamine), para-hydroxynorephedrine (4,β-dihydroxyamphetamine), and oxilofrine (4,β-dihydroxy-N-methylamphetamine).

The experimental log P of metaraminol is -0.27 and its predicted log P ranges from -0.59 to 0.07.

Metaraminol is used pharmaceutically as the bitartrate salt.

== History ==
Metaraminol was approved for medical use in the United States in September 1954.

== Society and culture ==
=== Names ===
Metaraminol is the generic name of the medication and its INN and BAN, while its DCF is métaraminol and its DCIT is metaraminolo. As the bitartrate salt, its generic name is metaraminol bitartrate and this is its USAN and JAN, while metaraminol tartrate is its BANM. A synonym of metaraminol is metaradrine. Brand names of metaraminol include Aramin, Aramine, and Pressonex, among others.
