= Perilla oil =

Vegetable oil derived from perilla seeds

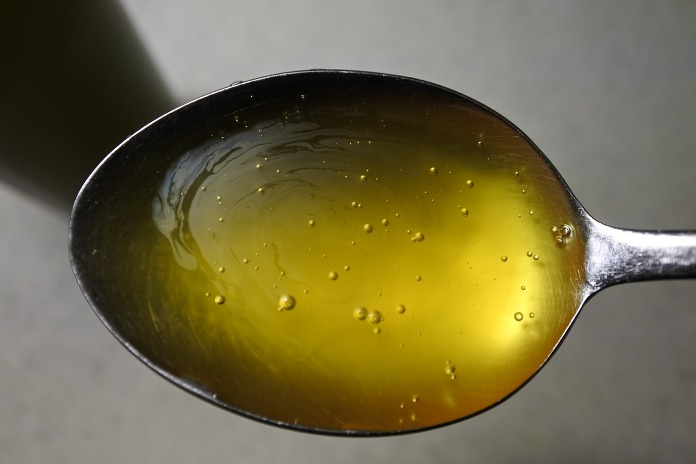

Nutritional value per 100 g (3.5 oz)
- Energy: 884 kcal (3,700 kJ)
- Fat: 100 g
- Saturated: 6–10 g
- Monounsaturated: 12–22 g
- Polyunsaturated omega−3 omega−6: 65–86 g 52–64 g 14 g
- ^{†}Percentages estimated using US recommendations for adults.

Perilla oil (Korean: 들기름; RR: deulgireum) is an edible vegetable oil derived from perilla seeds. Having a distinct nutty aroma and taste, the oil pressed from the toasted perilla seeds is used as a flavor enhancer, condiment, and cooking oil in Korean cuisine. The oil pressed from untoasted perilla seeds is used for both culinary and non-culinary purposes.

== Production ==
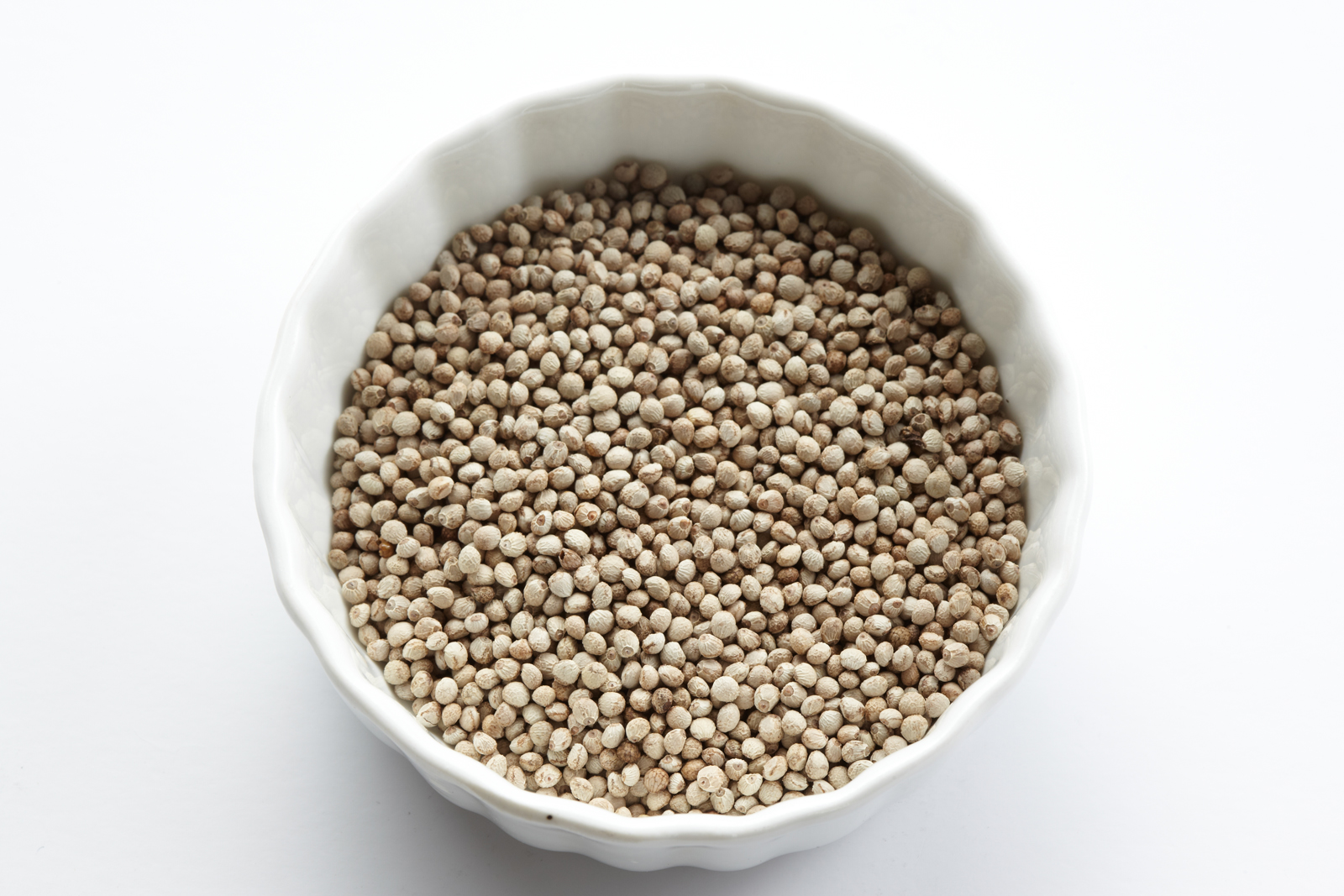
Perilla seeds

Perilla oil is obtained by pressing the seeds of perilla, which contains 38-45% lipids.

In South Korea, cold pressed perilla oil from untoasted seeds is also available for culinary use.

== Nutrition ==
Perilla oil is considered a rich source of fatty acids, and contains both saturated and unsaturated fatty acids. Saturated fatty acids in perilla oil are mainly palmitic (4–9%) and stearic (1–4%). Monounsaturated fatty acids in perilla oil are oleic (13–18%), while polyunsaturated fatty acids in perilla oil are linoleic (14–20%) and linolenic acids (54–4%).

In comparison to other plant oils, perilla oil exhibits one of the highest proportion of omega-3 fatty acids, which is between 54 and 64%. The omega-6 fatty acid component is usually around 14%.

== Use ==
=== Culinary ===
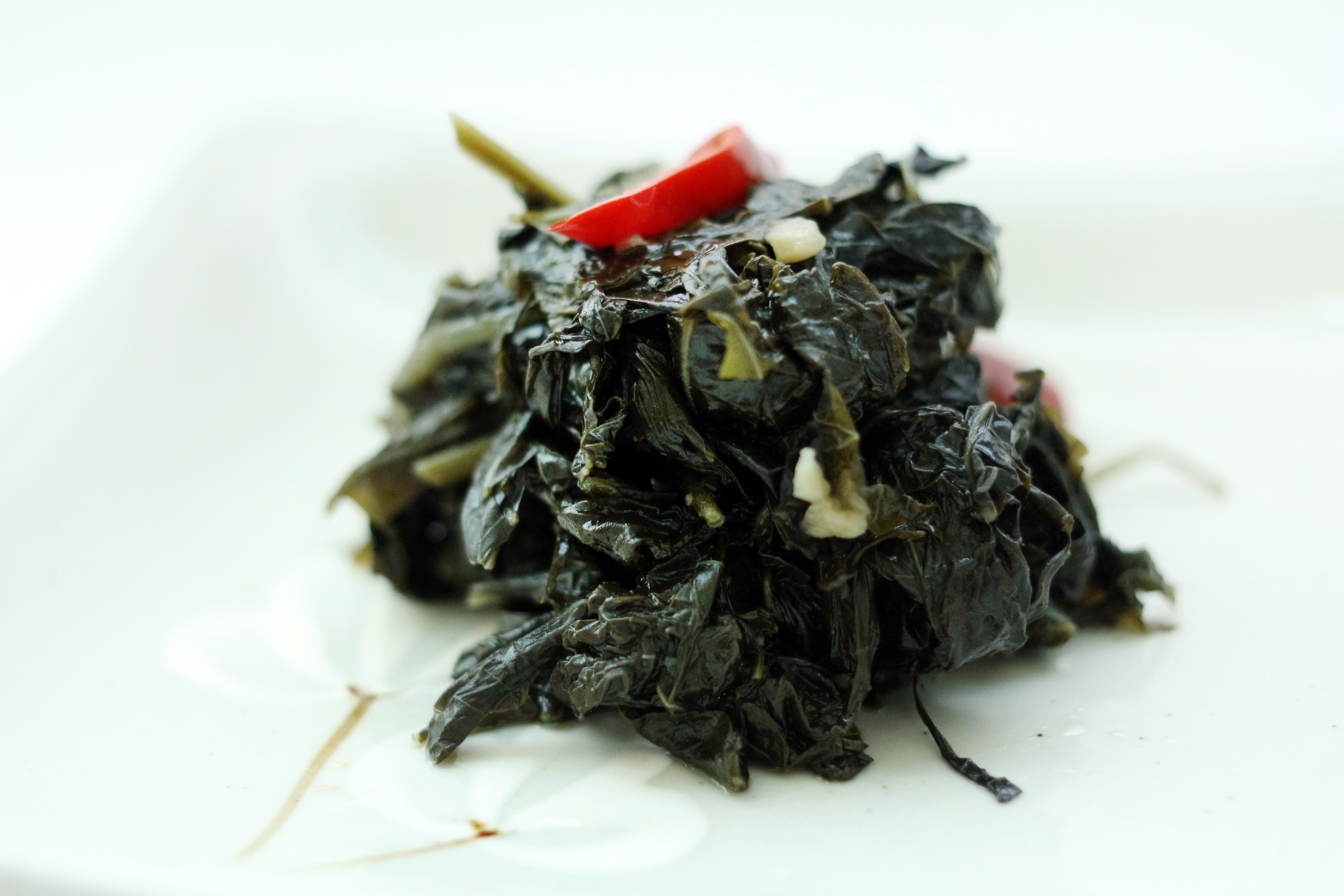
Kkaennip-deulgireum-bokkeum (perilla leaves stir-fried in perilla oil)

In Korean cuisine, perilla oil and sesame oil are the two chief oils used in flavoring, sauces, and dips. Usually made from toasted perilla seeds, the oil is used as a flavor enhancer, condiment, and cooking oil. Either sesame or perilla oil can be used for flavoring namul (vegetable side dishes) and other sides, pan-frying jeon (pan-fried dishes), coating gim (laver) before roasting it, and forming the flavor base for dipping sauce. Specifically, perilla oil is more common in the southern part of Korea as perilla is cultivated more easily in the warmer areas. Nowadays, perilla oil is used in Korean-style Western food as well. A Michelin-starred restaurant in Seoul serves nutty vanilla ice cream which has perilla oil as its "secret ingredient."

=== Industrial ===
Perilla oil made from untoasted seeds can be used for non-culinary purposes, including in paint, varnish, printing ink and linoleum. As a drying oil similar to tung oil or linseed oil, perilla oil has been used for paints, varnishes, linoleum, printing ink, lacquers, and for protective waterproof coatings on cloth. Perilla oil can also be used for fuel. It is used along with synthetic resins in the production of varnishes. It dries faster than linseed oil and on drying forms a film that is harder and yellows more than that formed by linseed oil. The paint and varnish industry accounts for the largest usage. Perilla oil is also important in the manufacture of printing inks and linoleum, and in more ancient times was a critical component in creating durable earthen floors.

In Japan, perilla oil was important for fueling oil lamps until early 16th century, before it was overtaken by rapeseed oil. The oilseed contains drying oil elements and was imported in bulk as a substitute for linseed oil into the United States from Japan, until the supply was interrupted by war.

In Korea, perilla oil pressed from the untoasted seeds were used to fuel lamps and to oil floor papers.

=== Use of press cake ===
The press cake remaining after pressing perilla oil can be used as natural fertilizer or animal feed.

== Safety ==
Perilla oil is categorized as Hazard Grade III of Class 4 Hazardous Substances, by Presidential Order 33005 of Act On The Safety Control Of Hazardous Substances of the Republic of Korea. It is mainly due to its high iodine value (over 130), thus having a small probability of spontaneous combustion.
