= Meta-Hydroxynorephedrine =

Chemical compound

meta-Hydroxynorephedrine

Clinical data
- Other names: m-hydroxypropadrine m-hydroxyphenylpropanolamine α-methyl-m-octopamine 3,β-dihydroxyamphetamine 3,β-dihydroxy-α-methylphenethylamine
- ATC code: None

Legal status
- Legal status: In general: non-regulated

Identifiers
- IUPAC name: 3-(2-amino-1-hydroxypropyl)phenol
- CAS Number: 7619-17-2
- PubChem CID: 4087
- ChemSpider: 3945
- CompTox Dashboard (EPA): DTXSID50858992

Chemical and physical data
- Formula: C_{9}H_{13}NO_{2}
- Molar mass: 167.208 g·mol^{−1}
- 3D model (JSmol): Interactive image
- SMILES: OC(c1cc(O)ccc1)C(N)C
- InChI: InChI=1S/C9H13NO2/c1-6(10)9(12)7-3-2-4-8(11)5-7/h2-6,9,11-12H,10H2,1H3; Key:WXFIGDLSSYIKKV-UHFFFAOYSA-N

meta-Hydroxynorephedrine or 3-hydroxynorephedrine, also known as 3,β-dihydroxyamphetamine, is an adrenergic drug of the amphetamine class which was patented as a vasopressor and nasal decongestant but was never marketed. It is the racemic form of the sympathomimetic drug metaraminol.

== See also ==
- Hydroxynorephedrine
- Metaraminol
- Gepefrine
- Phenylpropanolamine
