= Perilla =

- Perilla frutescens

Scientific classification
- Kingdom: Plantae
- Clade: Tracheophytes
- Clade: Angiosperms
- Clade: Eudicots
- Clade: Asterids
- Order: Lamiales
- Family: Lamiaceae
- Subfamily: Nepetoideae
- Tribe: Elsholtzieae
- Genus: Perilla; L.

Genus of flowering plants

Perilla is a genus belonging to the mint family, Lamiaceae, comprising one major Asiatic crop species, Perilla frutescens, and a few wild species. The genus encompasses several distinct varieties of Asian herb, seed, and vegetable crop, including P. frutescens (deulkkae) and P. frutescens var. crispa (shiso). The genus name Perilla is also a frequently employed common name ("perilla"), applicable to all varieties. Perilla varieties are cross-fertile and intra-specific hybridization occurs naturally. Some varieties are considered invasive.

== Taxa and synonyms ==
The classification of Perilla is confused, partly because botanists struggled with distinguishing the two distinct cultigens as different species or variations. Until a few decades ago, P. frutescens var. crispa was regarded as a species in its own right, distinct from P. frutescens, although it was well established that these types readily cross-pollinate. An early example of dividing the two cultigens into different species is found in Matsumura's 1884 nomenclature book, where the synonym P. arguta Benth. is applied to P. frutescens var. crispa, and the synonym P. ocymoides L. was applied to P. frutescens. The species name P. ocymoides or P. ocimoides has historically been used to denote P. frutescens var. crispa, especially by the Japanese, (Note: e.g. occurs in Heibonsha 1964 Encyclopedia, though the genus name is misspelt) therefore it should not be considered an interchangeable synonym for either cultigen. Recent genetic research confirms that the cultigens are of a common gene pool, corroborating the taxonomists' claim for consolidating the two crops into one species.

Existing Perilla species:

- P. frutescens – also called Korean perilla or deulkkae; the leaves are called kkaennip
  - P. f. var. crispa – also called shiso, tía tô, or Japanese basil
  - P. f. var. hirtella – also called lemon perilla

Possible Perilla species with insufficient description and without known herbarium specimens include:

- P. cavaleriei H.Lév.
- P. heteromorpha Carrière
- P. setoyensis G.Honda

The past legacies and subsequent reclassification of taxa has led to confusion of nomenclature. The red or purple leafed variety of P. frutescens var. crispa had been dubbed P. nankinensis, and this label was used throughout the 19th century in the West following the introduction of the species for ornamental planting. Whether green-leafed or red-leafed, the perillaldehyde factor that characterizes the unique P. frutescens var. crispa fragrance may turn out to be present or absent in the individual or population, and this is not differentiable from outward appearance alone. Chemical studies classify the genus into different chemotypes, depending on the essential oils they contain. Three wild species that are endemic to Japan are recognized as genetically distinct from the cultivated P. frutescens var. crispa, however, some references treat, e.g., P. frutescens var. hirtella as the same species as the P. frutescens var. crispa.

=== Formerly placed here ===
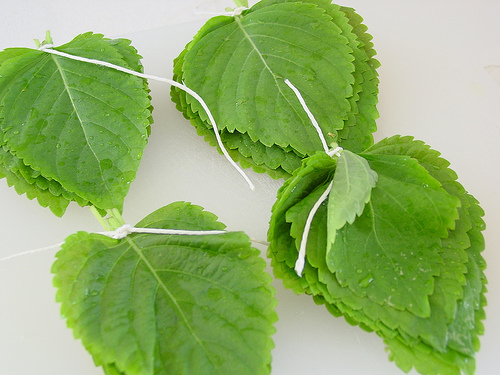
Kkaennip, the edible leaves of Perilla frutescens (P. frutescens)

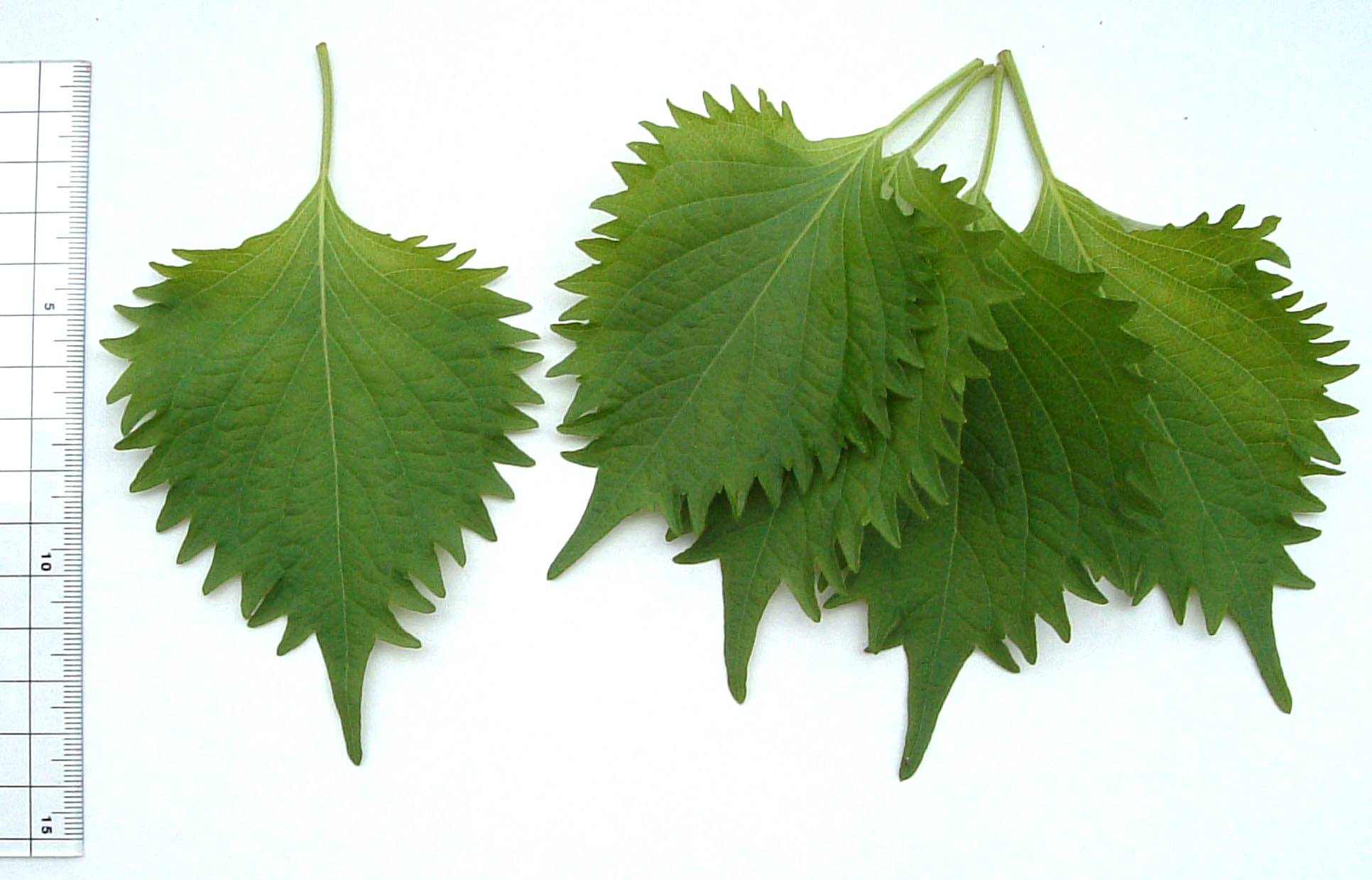
Aojiso, the edible leaves of Perilla frutescens var. crispa (P. frutescens var. crispa)

- P. elata D.Don. = Elsholtzia blanda (Benth.) Benth.
- P. fruticosa D.Don = Elsholtzia fruticosa (D. Don) Rehder
- P. lanceolata Benth = Mosla scabra (Thunb.) C.Y.Wu & H.W.Li
- P. leptostachya D.Don. = Elsholtzia stachyodes (Link) Raizada & H.O.Saxena
- P. marathrosma Spreng. = Agastache foeniculum (Pursh) Kuntze
- P. nankinensis Wender. = Plectranthus scutellarioides (L.) R.Br.
- P. polystachya D.Don. = Elsholtzia ciliata (Thunb.) Hyl.

== Use ==
=== Culinary use ===
Perilla varieties are cultivated and consumed mainly in China, Korea, Japan, Thailand and Vietnam. P. frutescens leaves, seeds, and seed oil are used extensively in Korean cuisine, while P. frutescens var. crispa leaves, seeds, and sprouts are used in Japanese and Vietnamese cuisines.

=== Herbalism ===
Perilla is one of the 50 fundamental herbs in Traditional Chinese Medicine. It is called "zi su" (紫苏/紫蘇), and is used to disperse wind-cold, bloating, and stomach and lung problems. It is sometimes paired with Tu Huo Xiang or Guang Huo Xiang to dispel dampness and tonify qi.
