= P-Hydroxynorephedrine =

Chemical compound

p-Hydroxynorephedrine

Clinical data
- Other names: 4-Hydroxynorephedrine para-Hydroxynorephedrine

Identifiers
- IUPAC name: 4-(2-amino-1-hydroxypropyl)phenol
- CAS Number: 771-91-5
- PubChem CID: 6931143
- ChemSpider: 5305318
- UNII: O6914L7189

Chemical and physical data
- Formula: C_{9}H_{13}NO_{2}
- Molar mass: 167.208 g·mol^{−1}
- 3D model (JSmol): Interactive image
- SMILES: [C@@H]([C@H](C)N)(O)C1=CC=C(O)C=C1
- InChI: InChI=1S/C9H13NO2/c1-6(10)9(12)7-2-4-8(11)5-3-7/h2-6,9,11-12H,10H2,1H3/t6-,9-/m0/s1; Key:JAYBQRKXEFDRER-RCOVLWMOSA-N

p-Hydroxynorephedrine (PHN or 4-hydroxynorephedrine) is the para-hydroxy analog of norephedrine and an active sympathomimetic metabolite of amphetamine in humans. When it occurs as a metabolite of amphetamine, it is produced from both p-hydroxyamphetamine and norephedrine.

== Amphetamine metabolism ==
Metabolic pathways of amphetamine in humans
In humans, para-hydroxynorephedrine is a metabolite of amphetamine. The aromatic ring hydroxylation of the substituted amphetamines in this image is mediated by CYP2D6 and dopamine β-hydroxylase.

== See also ==
- Hydroxynorephedrine
