= Limonene =

Chemical compound

Skeletal structure of the (R)-isomer
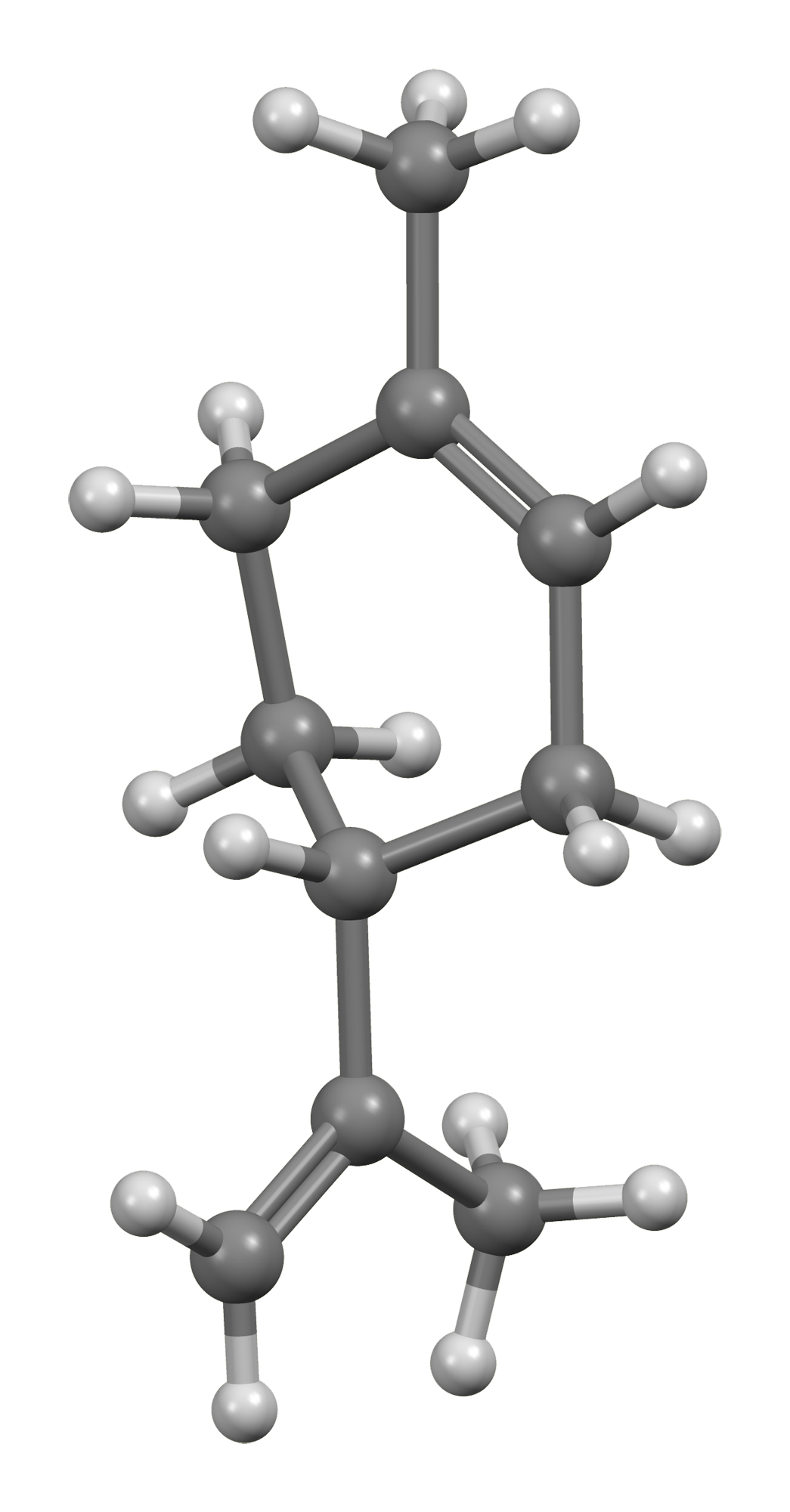
Ball-and-stick model of the (R)-isomer
Limonene (R)-isomer
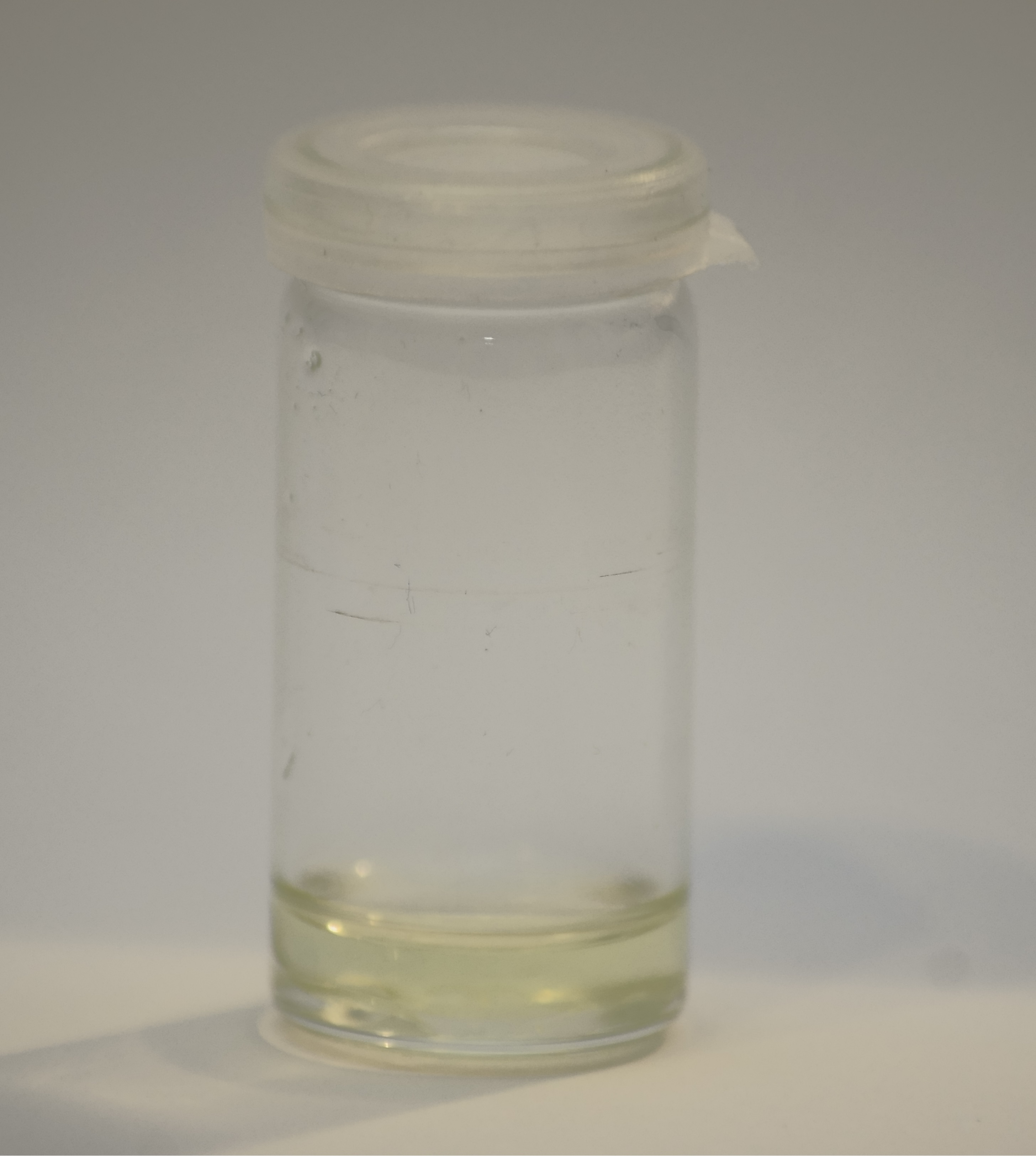
- Limonene extracted from orange peels. Limonene extracted from orange peel

Names
Pronunciation	/ˈlɪməˌniːn/ LIM-uh-neen
- Preferred IUPAC name 1-Methyl-4-(prop-1-en-2-yl)cyclohex-1-ene
- Other names 1-Methyl-4-(1-methylethenyl)cyclohexene; 4-Isopropenyl-1-methylcyclohexene p-Menth-1,8-diene; Racemic: DL-Limonene; Dipentene

Identifiers
CAS Number	138-86-3 (R/S); 5989-27-5 (R); 5989-54-8 (S)
3D model (JSmol)	Interactive image
ChEBI	CHEBI:15384
ChEMBL	ChEMBL449062 (R)
ChemSpider	20939 (R/S); 388386 (S); 389747 (R)
ECHA InfoCard	100.004.856
KEGG	D00194
PubChem CID	22311 (R/S); 439250 (S)
UNII	9MC3I34447 (R/S); GFD7C86Q1W (R); 47MAJ1Y2NE (S)
CompTox Dashboard (EPA)	DTXSID2029612
- InChI: InChI=1S/C10H16/c1-8(2)10-6-4-9(3)5-7-10/h4,10H,1,5-7H2,2-3H3 Key: XMGQYMWWDOXHJM-UHFFFAOYSA-N
- SMILES: CC1=CCC(CC1)C(=C)C

Properties
Chemical formula	C_{10}H_{16}
Molar mass	136.238 g·mol^{−1}
Appearance	colorless liquid
Odor	Orange
Density	0.8411 g/cm^{3}
Melting point	−74.35 °C (−101.83 °F; 198.80 K)
Boiling point	176 °C (349 °F; 449 K)
Solubility in water	Insoluble
Solubility	Miscible with benzene, chloroform, ether, CS_{2}, and oils soluble in CCl_{4}
Chiral rotation ([α]_{D})	87–102°
Refractive index (n_{D})	1.4727

Thermochemistry
Std enthalpy of combustion (Δ_{c}H^{⦵}_{298})	−6.128 MJ mol^{−1}

Hazards
- Occupational safety and health (OHS/OSH)
Main hazards	Skin sensitizer / Contact dermatitis – After aspiration, pulmonary oedema, pneumonitis, and death
- GHS labelling
Pictograms	(GHS02: Flammable) (GHS07: Exclamation mark) (GHS08: Health hazard) (GHS09: Environmental hazard)
Signal word	Danger
Hazard statements	H226, H304, H315, H317, H410
Precautionary statements	P210, P233, P235, P240, P241, P242, P243, P261, P264, P272, P273, P280, P301+P330+P331, P302+P352, P303+P361+P353, P304+P340, P312, P333+P313, P362, P370+P378, P391, P403+P233, P405, P501
NFPA 704 (fire diamond)	2 2 0
Flash point	50 °C (122 °F; 323 K)
Autoignition temperature	237 °C (459 °F; 510 K)
- Except where otherwise noted, data are given for materials in their standard state (at 25 °C [77 °F], 100 kPa). Infobox references

Limonene (/ˈlɪmənˌiːn/) is a slightly yellow-green liquid aliphatic hydrocarbon classified as a cyclic monoterpene, and is the major component in the fragrance and essential oil of citrus fruit peels, taking its name from Italian limone 'lemon'.

Limonene is a chiral molecule, and most biological sources produce just one enantiomer (isomer). The (+)-isomer, d-limonene, which is the (R)-enantiomer, occurs more commonly in nature in citrus fruit peels, the principal commercial source, from which it is obtained commercially by two primary methods: centrifugal separation and steam distillation. d-Limonene is used as a flavoring agent in food manufacturing, in chemical synthesis as a precursor to carvone, and as a renewables-based solvent in cleaning products. It has a "citrus, orange, fresh, sweet, peely" aroma.

The less common (−)-isomer, l-limonene, which is the (S)-enantiomer, has a piny, turpentine-like odor, and is found in the edible parts of such plants as caraway, dill, and bergamot orange.

== In plants ==
Biosynthesis of limonene from geranyl pyrophosphate

Limonene is a major component of the aromatic scents and resins characteristic of numerous coniferous and broadleaved trees: red and silver maple (Acer rubrum, Acer saccharinum), cottonwoods (Populus angustifolia), aspens (Populus grandidentata, Populus tremuloides) sumac (Rhus glabra), spruce (Picea spp.), various pines (e.g., Pinus echinata, Pinus ponderosa, Pinus leucodermis), Douglas fir (Pseudotsuga menziesii), larches (Larix spp.), true firs (Abies spp.), hemlocks (Tsuga spp.), cedars (Cedrus spp.), various Cupressaceae, and juniper bush (Juniperus spp.). It contributes to the characteristic odor of orange peel, orange juice and other citrus fruits. To optimize recovery of valued components from citrus peel waste, (+)-limonene is typically removed.

== Chemical reactions ==
Limonene is a relatively stable monoterpene and can be distilled without decomposition, although at elevated temperatures it cracks to form isoprene. It oxidizes easily in moist air to produce carveol, carvone, and limonene oxide. With sulfur, it undergoes dehydrogenation to p-cymene.

Limonene occurs commonly as the (R)-enantiomer, but racemizes at 300 °C. When warmed with mineral acid, limonene isomerizes to the conjugated diene α-terpinene (which can also easily be converted to p-cymene). Evidence for this isomerization includes the formation of Diels–Alder adducts between α-terpinene adducts and maleic anhydride.

It is possible to effect reaction at one of the double bonds selectively. Anhydrous hydrogen chloride reacts preferentially at the disubstituted alkene, whereas epoxidation with m-CPBA occurs at the trisubstituted alkene.

In another synthetic method Markovnikov addition of trifluoroacetic acid followed by hydrolysis of the acetate gives terpineol.

The most widely practiced conversion of limonene is to carvone. The three-step reaction begins with the regioselective addition of nitrosyl chloride across the trisubstituted double bond. This species is then converted to the oxime with a base, and the hydroxylamine is removed to give the ketone-containing carvone.

=== Biosynthesis ===
In nature, limonene is formed from geranyl pyrophosphate, via cyclization of a neryl carbocation or its equivalent as shown. The final step involves loss of a proton from the cation to form the alkene.

== Uses ==
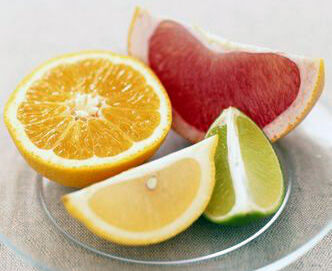
Limonene contributes to the characteristic odor of citrus peels (zest)

As the main fragrance of citrus peels, D-limonene is used in food manufacturing and some medicines, such as a flavoring agent to mask the bitter taste of alkaloids, and as a fragrance in perfumery, aftershave lotions, bath products, and other personal care products. (+)-Limonene is also used as a botanical insecticide. (+)-Limonene is used in the organic herbicides. It is added to cleaning products, such as hand cleansers, to give a lemon or orange fragrance (see orange oil) and for its ability to dissolve oils. In contrast, (−)-limonene has a piny, turpentine-like odor.

Limonene is used as a solvent for cleaning purposes, such as adhesive remover, or the removal of oil from machine parts, as it is produced from a renewable source (citrus essential oil, as a byproduct of orange juice manufacture). It is used as a paint stripper and is also useful as a fragrant alternative to turpentine. Limonene is also used as a solvent in some model airplane glues and as a constituent in some paints. Commercial air fresheners, with air propellants, containing limonene are used by stamp collectors to remove self-adhesive postage stamps from envelope paper.

Limonene is also used as a solvent for fused filament fabrication based 3D printing. Printers can print the plastic of choice for the model, but erect supports and binders from high impact polystyrene (HIPS), a polystyrene plastic that is easily soluble in limonene.

In preparing tissues for histology or histopathology, D-limonene is often used as a less toxic substitute for xylene when clearing dehydrated specimens. Clearing agents are liquids miscible with alcohols (such as ethanol or isopropanol) and with melted paraffin wax, in which specimens are embedded to facilitate cutting of thin sections for microscopy.

Limonene, from orange peel oil, is also combustible and has been considered as an alternative petrochemical fuel additive and biofuel.

== Safety and research ==
Applied to skin, limonene may cause irritation from contact dermatitis, but otherwise appears to be safe for human use. Limonene is flammable as a liquid or vapor and toxic to aquatic life.

=== Cancer ===
There is no evidence that the limonene in peel oils of citrus fruits affects the onset or progress of cancer, with one US national agency stating, "There is no consistent evidence that people with cancer who consume limonene—either in supplement form or by eating citrus fruits—get better or are more likely to be cured".

== See also ==
- Essential oil – Hydrophobic liquid containing volatile aroma compounds from plants
- Monoterpenes – Unsaturated hydrocarbon
- Resin – Organic polymer, typically from plants
