= 17β-Hydroxysteroid dehydrogenase =

Class of enzymes

Identifiers
- EC no.: 1.1.1.51
- CAS no.: 9015-81-0

Databases
- BRENDA: enzyme data
- ExPASy: NiceZyme view
- KEGG: enzyme entry
- MetaCyc: metabolic pathway
- Rhea: reactions
- PDB structures: RCSB PDB PDBe PDBsum
- Gene Ontology: AmiGO / QuickGO
Search
- PMC: articles
- PubMed: articles
- NCBI: proteins

17β-Hydroxysteroid dehydrogenases (17β-HSD, HSD17B) (EC 1.1.1.51), also 17-ketosteroid reductases (17-KSR), are a group of alcohol oxidoreductases which catalyze the reduction of 17-ketosteroids and the dehydrogenation of 17β-hydroxysteroids in steroidogenesis and steroid metabolism. This includes interconversion of DHEA and androstenediol, androstenedione and testosterone, and estrone and estradiol.

The major reactions catalyzed by 17β-HSD (such as the conversion of androstenedione to testosterone) are hydrogenation (reduction) reactions, rather than dehydrogenation (oxidation) reactions.

== Reactions ==
Steroidogenesis. 17β-HSD visible in bottom-left region.

17β-HSDs catalyze the following redox reactions of sex steroids:

- 20α-Hydroxyprogesterone ↔ Progesterone
- DHEA ↔ Androstenediol
- Androstenedione ↔ Testosterone
- Dihydrotestosterone ↔ 5α-Androstanedione / 3α-Androstanediol / 3β-Androstanediol
- Estrone ↔ Estradiol
- 16α-Hydroxyestrone ↔ Estriol

=== Activity distribution ===
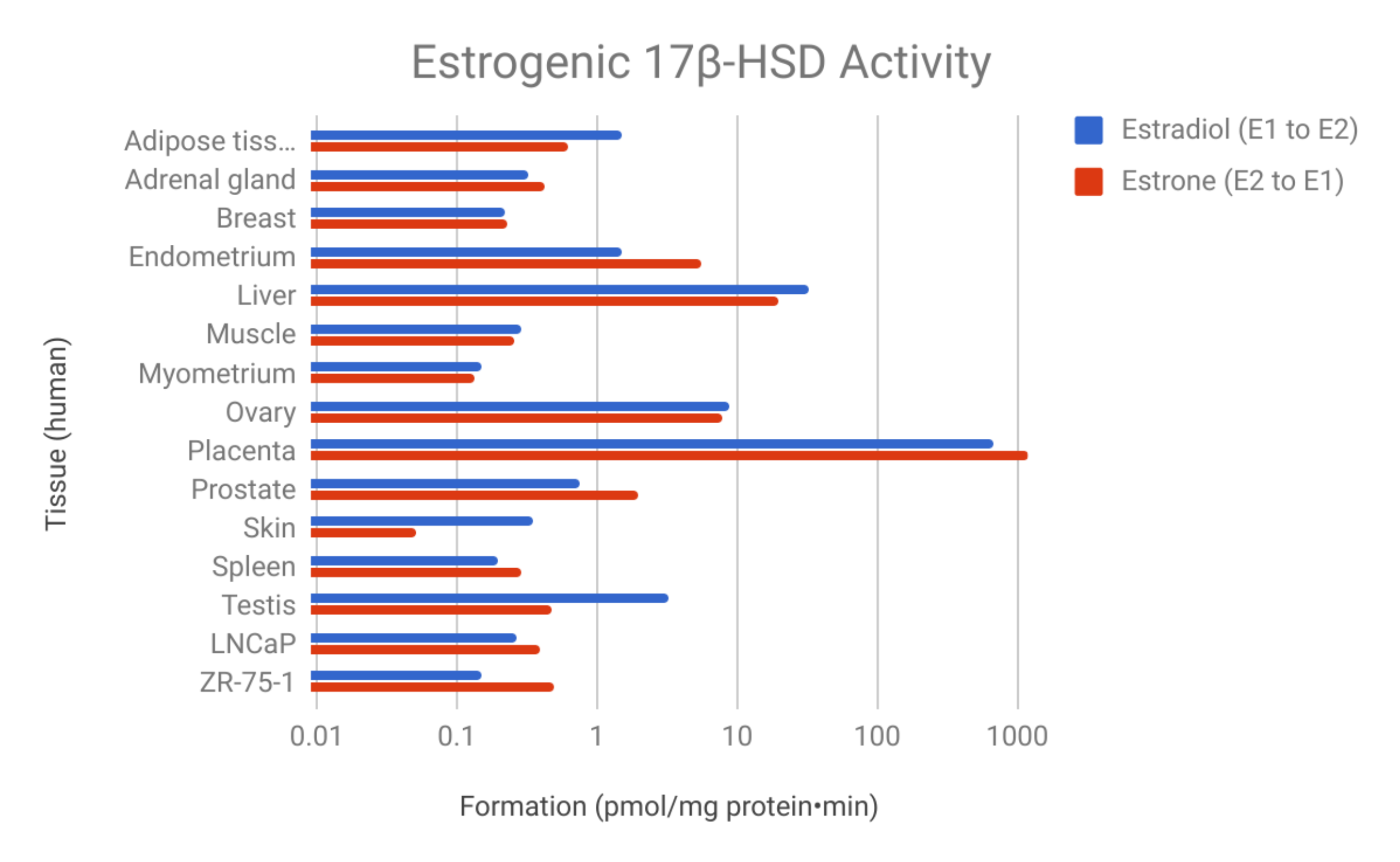
Distribution of 17β-HSD activities for formation of estradiol versus estrone in human tissues.

== Genes ==
Genes coding for 17β-HSD include:

- HSD17B1: Referred to as "estrogenic". Major subtype for activation of estrogens from weaker forms (estrone to estradiol and 16α-hydroxyestrone to estriol). Catalyzes the final step in the biosynthesis of estrogens. Highly selective for estrogens; 100-fold higher affinity for estranes over androstanes. However, also catalyzes the conversion of DHEA into androstenediol. Recently, has been found to inactivate DHT into 3α- and 3β-androstanediol. Expressed primarily in the ovaries and placenta but also at lower levels in the breast epithelium. Major isoform of 17β-HSD in the granulosa cells of the ovaries. Mutations and associated deficiency have not been reported in humans. Knockout mice show altered ovarian sex steroid production, normal puberty, and severe subfertility due to defective luteinization and ovarian progesterone production.
- HSD17B2: Describable as "antiestrogenic" and "antiandrogenic". Major subtype for inactivation of estrogens and androgens into weaker forms (estradiol to estrone, testosterone to androstenedione, and androstenediol to DHEA). Also converts inactive 20α-hydroxyprogesterone into active progesterone. Preferential activity on androgens. Expressed widely in the body including in the liver, intestines, lungs, pancreas, kidneys, endometrium, prostate, breast epithelium, placenta, and bone. Said to be responsible for 17β-HSD activity in the endometrium and placenta. Mutations and associated congenital deficiency have not been reported in humans. However, local deficiency in expression of HSD17B2 has been associated with endometriosis.
- HSD17B3: Referred to as "androgenic". Major subtype in males for activation of androgens from weaker forms (androstenedione to testosterone and DHEA to androstenediol). Also activates estrogens from weaker forms to a lesser extent (estrone to estradiol). This is essential for testicular but not ovarian production of testosterone. Not expressed in the ovaries, where another 17β-HSD subtype, likely HSD17B5, is expressed instead. Mutations are associated with 17β-HSD type III deficiency. Males with this condition have pseudohermaphroditism, while females are normal with normal androgen and estrogen levels.
- HSD17B4: Also known as D-bifunctional protein (DBP). Involved in fatty acid β-oxidation and steroid metabolism (specifically estrone to estradiol, for instance in the uterus). Mutations are associated with DBP deficiency and Perrault syndrome (ovarian dysgenesis and deafness).
- HSD17B5: Also known as aldo-keto reductase 1C3 (AKR1C3), encoded by the AKR1C3 gene in humans. Has 3α-HSD and 20α-HSD activity in addition to 17β-HSD activity. Expressed in the adrenal cortex and may act as the "androgenic" 17β-HSD in ovarian thecal cells. Also expressed in the prostate gland, mammary gland, and Leydig cells.
- HSD17B6: Has 3α-HSD activity and catalyzes conversion of the weak androgen androstanediol into the powerful androgen dihydrotestosterone in the prostate gland. Also involved into a backdoor pathway from 17α-hydroxyprogesterone to dihydrotestosterone by 3α-reduction of a metabolic intermediary, 17α-hydroxydihydroprogesterone, into another intermediary, 17α-hydroxyallopregnanolone. May be involved in the pathophysiology of polyendocrine metabolic ovarian syndrome (PMOS).
- HSD17B7: Is involved in cholesterol metabolism but is also thought to activate estrogens (estrone to estradiol) and inactivate androgens (dihydrotestosterone to androstanediol). Expressed in the ovaries, breasts, placenta, testes, prostate gland, and liver.
- HSD17B8: Inactivates estradiol, testosterone, and dihydrotestosterone, though can also convert estrone into estradiol. Expressed in the ovaries, testes, liver, pancreas, kidneys, and other tissues.
- HSD17B9: Also known as retinol dehydrogenase 5 (RDH5). Involved in retinoid metabolism. Mutations are associated with fundus albipunctatus.
- HSD17B10: Also known as 2-methyl-3-hydroxybutyryl-CoA dehydrogenase (MHBD). Substrates include steroids, neurosteroids, fatty acids, bile acids, isoleucine, and xenobiotics. Mutations are associated with 17β-HSD type X deficiency (also known as HSD10 disease or MHBD deficiency) and mental retardation, X-linked, syndromic 10 (MRXS10), which are characterized by neurodegeneration and mental retardation, respectively.
- HSD17B11: very little is known on the role/function of this iszyme.
- HSD17B12
- HSD17B13
- HSD17B14

At least 7 of the 14 isoforms of 17β-HSD are involved in interconversion of 17-ketosteroids and 17β-hydroxysteroids.

=== Overview ===
Comparison and characteristics of human 17β-HSD isoenzymes
#	Gene name	Synonyms	Family	Size (AA)	Gene location	Cellular location	Substrate specificities	Preferred cofactor	Catalytic preference	Tissue distribution	Expression profile	Pathology
1	HSD17B1		SDR	328	17q21.2	Cytosol	Estrogens	NADH, NADPH	Reduction	Ovary, endometrium, breast, brain, prostate, placenta	Strongly restricted	Breast cancer, prostate cancer, endometriosis
2	HSD17B2		SDR	387	16q23.3	ER	Estrogens, androgens, progestogens	NAD^{+}	Oxidation	Liver, intestine, endometrium, placenta, pancreas, prostate, colon, bone	Selectively distributed	Breast cancer, prostate cancer, endometriosis, osteoporosis
3	HSD17B3		SDR	310	9q22.32	ER	Androgens	NADPH	Reduction	Testis, ovary, blood, saliva, skin, adipose tissue, brain, bone	Strongly restricted	17β-HSD3 deficiency, prostate cancer
4	HSD17B4	DBP, MFP2	SDR	736	5q23.1	PXS	Fatty acids, bile acids, estrogens, androgens	NAD^{+}	Oxidation	Liver, heart, prostate, testis, lung, skeletal muscle, kidney, pancreas, thymus, ovary, intestine, placenta, brain, spleen, colon, lymphocytes	Ubiquitous	DBP deficiency, Perrault syndrome, prostate cancer
5	AKR1C3	HSD17B5, 3α-HSD2, PGFS	AKR	323	10p15.1	Nucleus, cytosol	Androgens, progestogens, estrogens, prostaglandins	NADPH	Reduction	Prostate, mammary gland, liver, kidney, lung, heart, small intestine, colon, uterus, testis, brain, skeletal muscle, adipose tissue	Nearly ubiquitous	Breast cancer, prostate cancer
6	HSD17B6		SDR	317	12q13.3	Endosomes	Retinoids, androgens, estrogens	NAD^{+}	Oxidation	Liver, testis, lung, spleen, brain, ovary, kidney, adrenal, prostate	Selectively distributed	?
7	HSD17B7		SDR	341	1q23.3	PM, ER	Cholesterol, estrogens, androgens, progestogens	NADPH	Reduction	Ovary, corpus luteum, uterus, placenta, liver, breast, testis, brain, adrenal gland, small intestine, lung, thymus, prostate, adipose tissue, others	Widely distributed	Breast cancer
8	HSD17B8		SDR	261	6p21.32	MC	Fatty acids, estrogens, androgens	NAD^{+}	Oxidation	Prostate, placenta, kidney, brain, cerebellum, heart, lung, small intestine, ovary, testis, adrenal, stomach	Widely distributed	Polycystic kidney disease
9	RDH5	HSD17B9		318	12q13.2	ER	Retinoids	NADH/NAD^{+}	Reduction / oxidation	Retina, liver, adipose tissue, blood, others	?	Fundus albipunctatus
10	HSD17B10	MHBD	SDR	261	Xp11.2	MC	Fatty acids, bile acids, estrogens, androgens, progestogens, corticosteroids	NAD^{+}	Oxidation	Liver, small intestine, colon, kidney, heart, brain, placenta, lung, ovary, testis, spleen, thymus, prostate, peripheral blood leukocytes	Nearly ubiquitous	17β-HSD10 deficiency, MRXS10, Alzheimer's disease
11	HSD17B11		SDR	300	4q22.1	ER, EP	Estrogens, androgens	NAD^{+}	Oxidation	Liver, pancreas, intestine, kidney, adrenal gland, heart, lung, testis, ovary, placenta, sebaceous gland	Nearly ubiquitous	?
12	HSD17B12		SDR	312	11p11.2	ER	Fatty acids, estrogens, androgens	NADPH	Reduction	Heart, skeletal muscle, liver, kidney, adrenal gland, testis, placenta, cerebellum, pancreas, stomach, small intestine, large intestine, trachea, lung, thyroid, esophagus, prostate, aorta, urinary bladder, spleen, skin, brain, ovary, breast, uterus, vagina	Ubiquitous	?
13	HSD17B13		SDR	300	4q22.1	ER, EP	?	NAD^{+}?	Oxidation?	Liver, bone marrow, lung, ovary, testis, kidney, skeletal muscle, brain, bladder, nasal epithelia	Strongly restricted	?
14	HSD17B14		SDR	270	19q13.33	Cytosol	Estrogens, androgens, fatty acids	NAD^{+}	Oxidation	Liver, kidney, brain, gallbladder, breast, adrenal, placenta	Widely distributed	Breast cancer (prognostic)
15	RDH11	PSDR1, HSD17B15	SDR	318	14q23-24.3	ER	Retinoids, androgens	NADPH	Reduction	Retina, prostate, brain, testis	?	Retinitis pigmentosa

== Clinical significance ==
Mutations in HSD17B3 are responsible for 17β-HSD type III deficiency.

Inhibitors of 17β-HSD type II are of interest for the potential treatment of osteoporosis.

Some inhibitors of 17β-HSD type I have been identified, for example esters of cinnamic acid and various flavones (e.g. fisetin).

== See also ==
- Steroidogenic enzyme
- 3α-Hydroxysteroid dehydrogenase
