= 3-hydroxyacyl-CoA dehydrogenase =

Enzyme

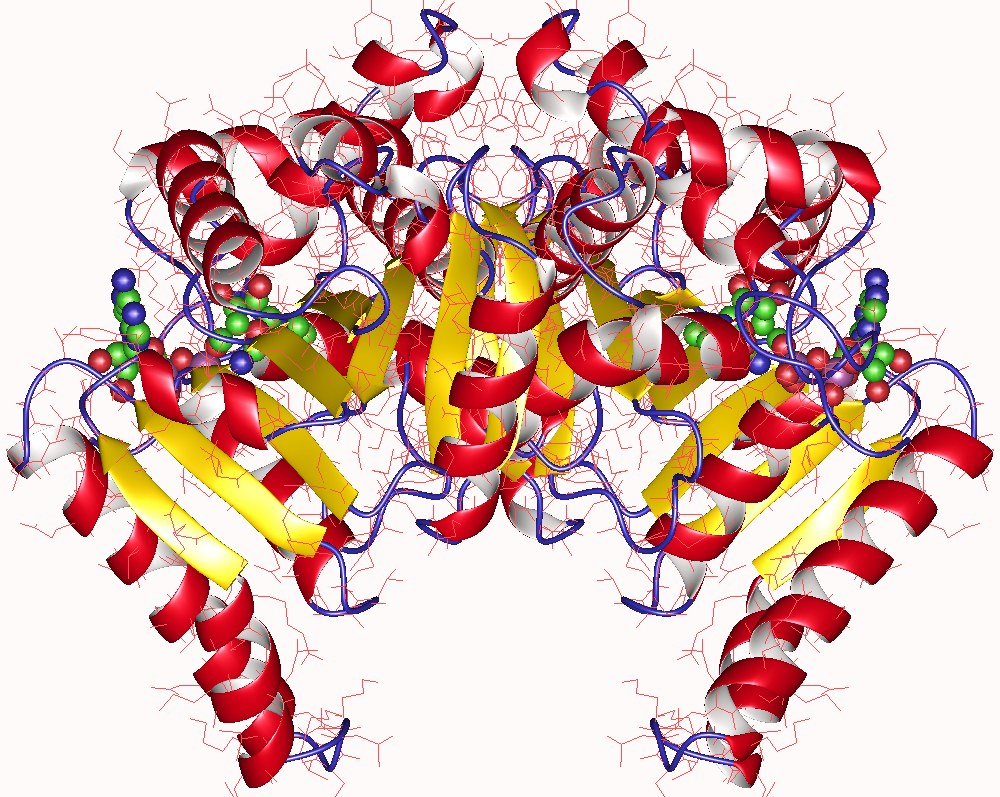
- (S)-3-hydroxybutyryl-CoA dehydrogenase homodimer, Cupriavidus necator

Identifiers
- EC no.: 1.1.1.35
- CAS no.: 9028-40-4

Databases
- BRENDA: enzyme data
- ExPASy: NiceZyme view
- KEGG: enzyme entry
- MetaCyc: metabolic pathway
- Rhea: reactions
- PDB structures: RCSB PDB PDBe PDBsum
- Gene Ontology: AmiGO / QuickGO
Search
- PMC: articles
- PubMed: articles
- NCBI: proteins

Hydroxyacyl-Coenzyme A dehydrogenase
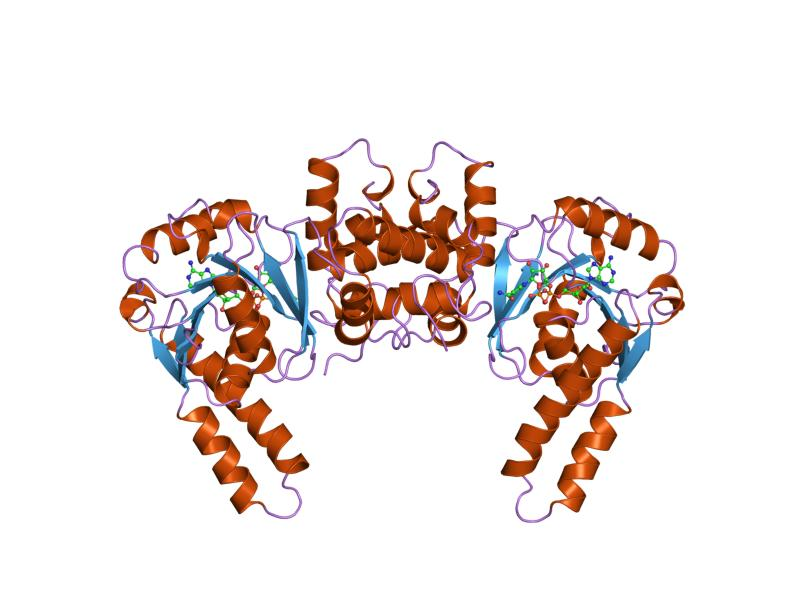
- PDB rendering based on 3had.

Identifiers
- Symbol: HADH
- Alt. symbols: HADHSC
- NCBI gene: 3033
- HGNC: 4799
- OMIM: 601609
- RefSeq: NM_005327
- UniProt: Q16836

Other data
- EC number: 1.1.1.35
- Locus: Chr. 4 q22-q26
Search for
- Structures: Swiss-model
- Domains: InterPro

In enzymology, a 3-hydroxyacyl-CoA dehydrogenase (EC 1.1.1.35) is an enzyme that catalyzes the chemical reaction

(S)-3-hydroxyacyl-CoA + NAD^{+} $\rightleftharpoons$ 3-oxoacyl-CoA + NADH + H^{+}

Thus, the two substrates of this enzyme are (S)-3-hydroxyacyl-CoA and NAD^{+}, whereas its 3 products are 3-oxoacyl-CoA, NADH, and H^{+}.

This enzyme belongs to the family of oxidoreductases, to be specific those acting on the CH-OH group of donor with NAD^{+} or NADP^{+} as acceptor.

== Isozymes ==
In humans, the following genes encode proteins with 3-hydroxyacyl-CoA dehydrogenase activity:

- HADH – Hydroxyacyl-Coenzyme A dehydrogenase
- HSD17B10 – 3-Hydroxyacyl-CoA dehydrogenase type-2
- EHHADH – Peroxisomal bifunctional enzyme
- HSD17B4 – Peroxisomal multifunctional enzyme type 2

== Function ==
3-Hydroxyacyl CoA dehydrogenase is classified as an oxidoreductase. It is involved in fatty acid metabolic processes. Specifically it catalyzes the third step of beta oxidation; the oxidation of L-3-hydroxyacyl CoA by NAD^{+}. The reaction converts the hydroxyl group into a keto group.

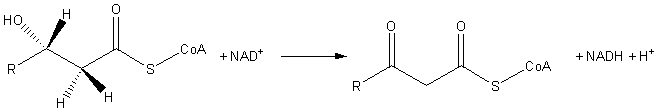

The end product is 3-ketoacyl CoA.

== Metabolic pathways ==
This enzyme participates in 8 metabolic pathways:

- fatty acid elongation in mitochondria
- fatty acid metabolism
- valine, leucine and isoleucine degradation
- lysine degradation
- tryptophan metabolism
- benzoate degradation via coa ligation
- butanoate metabolism
- caprolactam degradation

== Nomenclature ==
The systematic name of this enzyme class is (S)-3-hydroxyacyl-CoA:NAD^{+} oxidoreductase. Other names in common use include:

- 1-specific DPN-linked beta-hydroxybutyric dehydrogenase
- 3-hydroxyacetyl-coenzyme A dehydrogenase
- 3-hydroxyacyl coenzyme A dehydrogenase
- 3-hydroxybutyryl-CoA dehydrogenase
- 3-hydroxyisobutyryl-CoA dehydrogenase
- 3-keto reductase
- 3-L-hydroxyacyl-CoA dehydrogenase
- 3beta-hydroxyacyl coenzyme A dehydrogenase
- beta-hydroxy acid dehydrogenase
- beta-hydroxyacyl CoA dehydrogenase
- beta-hydroxyacyl dehydrogenase
- beta-hydroxyacyl-coenzyme A synthetase
- beta-hydroxyacylcoenzyme A dehydrogenase
- beta-hydroxybutyrylcoenzyme A dehydrogenase
- beta-keto-reductase
- beta-ketoacyl-CoA reductase
- L-3-hydroxyacyl CoA dehydrogenase
- L-3-hydroxyacyl coenzyme A dehydrogenase

== Structural studies ==
As of 20 January 2010, 22 structures have been solved for this class of enzymes, with PDB accession codes PDB: 1F0Y, PDB: 1F12, PDB: 1F14, PDB: 1F17, PDB: 1F67, PDB: 1GZ6, PDB: 1IKT, PDB: 1IL0, PDB: 1LSJ, PDB: 1LSO, PDB: 1M75, PDB: 1M76, PDB: 1S9C, PDB: 1WDK, PDB: 1WDL, PDB: 1WDM, PDB: 1ZBQ, PDB: 1ZCJ, PDB: 2D3T, PDB: 2HDH, PDB: 3HAD, and PDB: 3HDH.

== See also ==
- Acetoacetyl-CoA reductase acting on the enantiomer of the substrate
- 3-hydroxy-2-methylbutyryl-CoA dehydrogenase
