= HSD17B4 =

Protein-coding gene in the species Homo sapiens

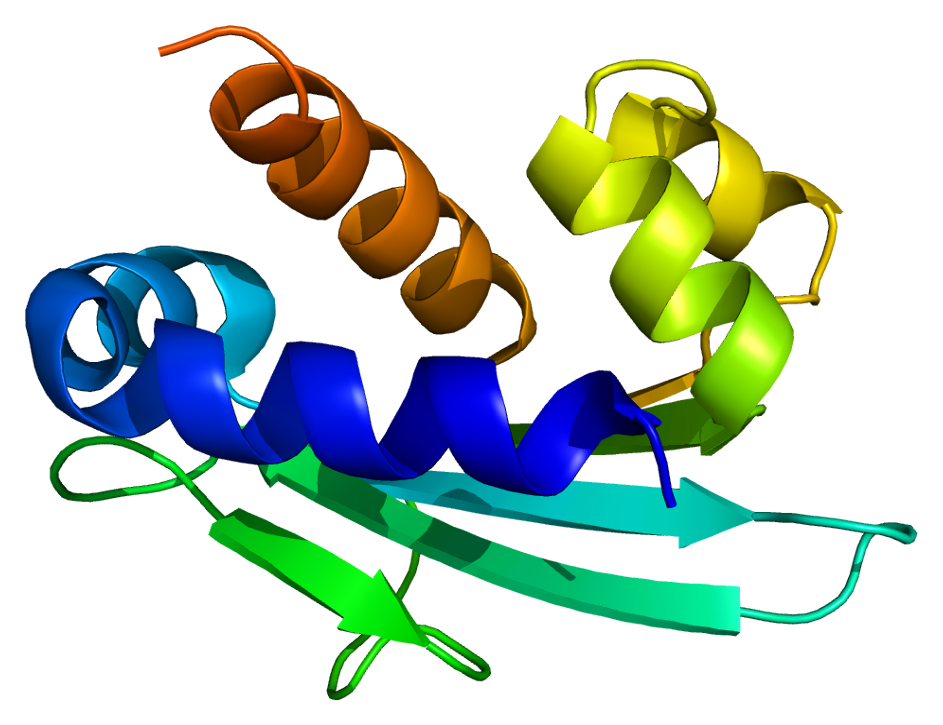

Identifiers
- Aliases: HSD17B4, DBP, MFE-2, MPF-2, PRLTS1, SDR8C1, hydroxysteroid (17-beta) dehydrogenase 4, hydroxysteroid 17-beta dehydrogenase 4
- External IDs: OMIM: 601860; MGI: 105089; GeneCards: HSD17B4
Available structures
PDB	Ortholog search: PDBe RCSB
PDB	List of PDB id codes 1IKT, 1S9C, 1ZBQ
Enzyme activity
EC #	BRENDA	ExPASy	KEGG	MetaCyc
4.2.1.107	↗	↗	↗	↗
4.2.1.119	↗	↗	↗	↗

Gene location (Human)
Chr.	Chromosome 5 (human)
Band	5q23.1	Start	119,452,473 bp
Band	5q23.1	End	119,637,199 bp

Gene location (Mouse)
Chr.	Chromosome 18 (mouse)
Band	18|18 D1	Start	50,261,268 bp
Band	18|18 D1	End	50,329,336 bp
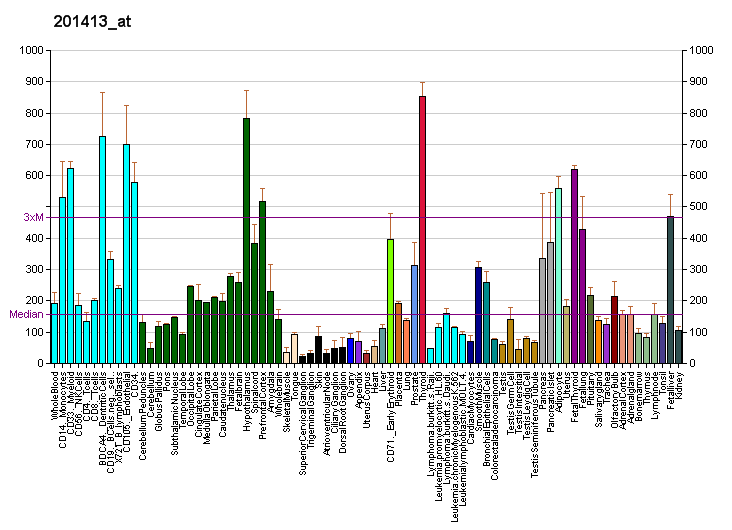
RNA expression pattern
Bgee	Human / Mouse (ortholog); Top expressed in: right lobe of thyroid gland; right lobe of liver; left lobe of thyroid gland; corpus callosum; internal globus pallidus; right adrenal cortex; C1 segment; body of pancreas; left adrenal gland; left adrenal cortex / Top expressed in: saccule; left lobe of liver; ectoderm; otic vesicle; otic placode; brown adipose tissue; external carotid artery; intercostal muscle; lacrimal gland; white adipose tissue; More reference expression data
BioGPS	More reference expression data
Gene ontology
Molecular function	protein homodimerization activity; isomerase activity; lyase activity; 3alpha,7alpha,12alpha-trihydroxy-5beta-cholest-24-enoyl-CoA hydratase activity; oxidoreductase activity; long-chain-enoyl-CoA hydratase activity; signaling receptor binding; 17-beta-hydroxysteroid dehydrogenase (NAD+) activity; 3-hydroxyacyl-CoA dehydrogenase activity
Cellular component	membrane; peroxisome; peroxisomal membrane; peroxisomal matrix; mitochondrion; cytosol
Biological process	estrogen metabolic process; androgen metabolic process; lipid metabolism; alpha-linolenic acid metabolic process; very long-chain fatty acid metabolic process; Sertoli cell development; fatty acid metabolic process; very long-chain fatty-acyl-CoA metabolic process; fatty acid beta-oxidation using acyl-CoA oxidase; osteoblast differentiation; medium-chain fatty-acyl-CoA metabolic process; fatty acid beta-oxidation; bile acid biosynthetic process; protein targeting to peroxisome
Sources:Amigo / QuickGO
Orthologs
Databases	NCBI: entry; OMA: entry
Species	Human	Mouse
Entrez	3295	15488
Ensembl	ENSG00000133835	ENSMUSG00000024507
UniProt	P51659	P51660
RefSeq (mRNA)	NM_001292028; NM_000414; NM_001199291; NM_001199292; NM_001292027	NM_008292
RefSeq (protein)	NP_000405; NP_001186220; NP_001186221; NP_001278956; NP_001278957 NP_001361426; NP_001361427; NP_001361428; NP_001361429; NP_001361430; NP_001361431; NP_001361432	NP_032318
Location (UCSC)	Chr 5: 119.45 – 119.64 Mb	Chr 18: 50.26 – 50.33 Mb
PubMed search
- Wikidata
View/Edit Human	View/Edit Mouse

D-bifunctional protein (DBP), also known as peroxisomal multifunctional enzyme type 2 (MFP-2), as well as 17β-hydroxysteroid dehydrogenase type IV (17β-HSD type IV) is a protein that in humans is encoded by the HSD17B4 gene. It's an alcohol oxidoreductase, specifically 17β-Hydroxysteroid dehydrogenase. It is involved in fatty acid β-oxidation and steroid metabolism (cf. steroidogenesis).

== Function ==
The HSD17B4 gene encodes an enzyme involved in peroxisomal fatty acid beta-oxidation. It was first identified as a 17-beta-estradiol dehydrogenase (Leenders et al., 1996; van Grunsven et al., 1998). Peroxisomal beta-oxidation of fatty acids, originally described by Lazarow and de Duve (1976), is catalyzed by 3 enzymes: acyl-CoA oxidase (see, e.g., ACOX1, MIM 609751); the 'D-bifunctional enzyme,' with enoyl-CoA hydratase and D-3-hydroxyacyl-CoA dehydrogenase activity, and 3-ketoacyl-CoA thiolase (MIM 604054).

See also the L-bifunctional peroxisomal protein (EHHADH; MIM 607037). The D- and L-bifunctional proteins have different substrate specificities. The D-bifunctional protein catalyzes the formation of 3-ketoacyl-CoA intermediates from both straight-chain and 2-methyl-branched-chain fatty acids and also acts in shortening cholesterol for bile acid formation. In contrast, the L-specific bifunctional protein does not have the latter 2 activities (Jiang et al., 1997).[supplied by OMIM]

== See also ==
- D-bifunctional protein deficiency
- Perrault syndrome
