= Acox =

Acox is a surname. Notable people with the surname include:

- Clarence Acox Jr., American band director and jazz drummer
- Kristófer Acox (born 1993), Icelandic basketball player

== See also ==
- ACOX1, human gene which encodes the enzyme peroxisomal acyl-coenzyme A oxidase 1
- ACOX3, human gene which encodes the enzyme peroxisomal acyl-coenzyme A oxidase 3
