= Acyl-CoA oxidase =

Family of enzymes

acyl-CoA oxidase

Identifiers
- EC no.: 1.3.3.6
- CAS no.: 61116-22-1

Databases
- BRENDA: enzyme data
- ExPASy: NiceZyme view
- KEGG: enzyme entry
- MetaCyc: metabolic pathway
- Rhea: reactions
- PDB structures: RCSB PDB PDBe PDBsum
- Gene Ontology: AmiGO / QuickGO
Search
- PMC: articles
- PubMed: articles
- NCBI: proteins

In enzymology, an acyl-CoA oxidase (EC 1.3.3.6) is an enzyme that catalyzes the chemical reaction

acyl-CoA + O_{2} $\rightleftharpoons$ trans-2,3-dehydroacyl-CoA + H_{2}O_{2}

Thus, the two substrates of this enzyme are acyl-CoA and O_{2}, whereas its two products are trans-2,3-dehydroacyl-CoA and H_{2}O_{2}.

Three varieties have been found in humans, called ACOX1, ACOX2, and ACOX3, and involved in peroxisomal beta-oxidation.

This enzyme belongs to the family of oxidoreductases, specifically those acting on the CH-CH group of donor with oxygen as acceptor. The systematic name of this enzyme class is acyl-CoA:oxygen 2-oxidoreductase. Other names in common use include fatty acyl-CoA oxidase, acyl coenzyme A oxidase, and fatty acyl-coenzyme A oxidase. This enzyme participates in 3 metabolic pathways: fatty acid metabolism, polyunsaturated fatty acid biosynthesis, and ppar signaling pathway. It employs one cofactor, FAD.

== Structural studies ==
As of late 2007, 6 structures have been solved for this class of enzymes, with PDB accession codes PDB: 1IS2, PDB: 1W07, PDB: 2DDH, PDB: 2FON, PDB: 2IX5, and PDB: 2IX6.

== See also ==
- Acyl-CoA oxidase deficiency
