= CH–CH oxidoreductases =

Class of enzymes

CH–CH oxidoreductases are oxidoreductase enzymes that convert single bonds and double bonds between two carbon atoms. They are classified under EC number 1.3.

One example is 5-alpha reductase:

Testosterone.

Dihydrotestosterone

Note the major difference—the Δ4,5 double-bond on the A (leftmost) ring. (The other differences between the diagrams are unrelated to chemical structure.)

== See also ==
- Alpha-santonin 1,2-reductase
