= Acetoacetyl-CoA reductase =

InterPro Family

acetoacetyl-CoA reductase
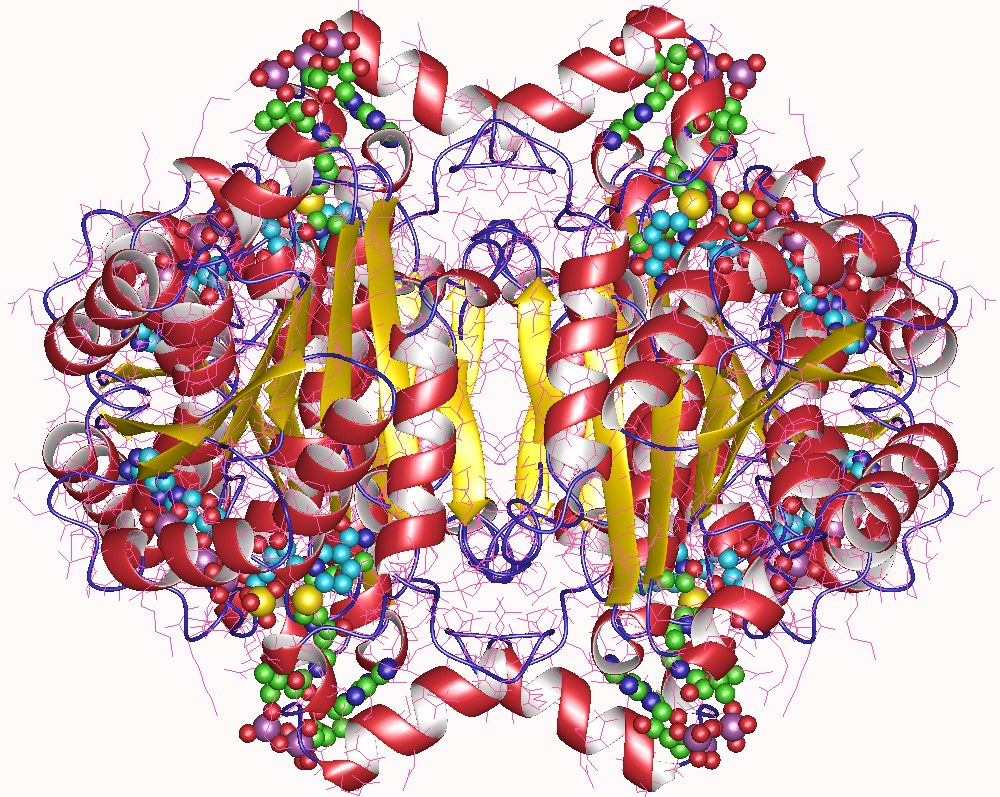
- Acetoacetyl-CoA reductase tetramer, Cupriavidus necator

Identifiers
- EC no.: 1.1.1.36
- CAS no.: 9028-41-5

Databases
- BRENDA: enzyme data
- ExPASy: NiceZyme view
- KEGG: enzyme entry
- MetaCyc: metabolic pathway
- Rhea: reactions
- PDB structures: RCSB PDB PDBe PDBsum
- Gene Ontology: AmiGO / QuickGO
Search
- PMC: articles
- PubMed: articles
- NCBI: proteins

Acetoacetyl-CoA reductases (EC 1.1.1.36) are a type of enzyme found in bacteria that catalyze the chemical reaction

(R)-3-hydroxyacyl-CoA
+ NADP^{+}
H^{+}
H^{+}
3-oxoacyl-CoA
+ NADPH

The two substrates of this enzyme are the (R) isomer of a 3-hydroxyacyl derivative of coenzyme A and oxidised nicotinamide adenine dinucleotide phosphate (NADP^{+}). Its products are the corresponding 3-oxoacyl derivative of the coenzyme, reduced NADPH, and a proton.

This enzyme belongs to the family of oxidoreductases, specifically those acting on the CH-OH group of donor with NAD^{+} or NADP^{+} as acceptor. The systematic name of this enzyme class is (R)-3-hydroxyacyl-CoA:NADP^{+} oxidoreductase. Other names in common use include acetoacetyl coenzyme A reductase, hydroxyacyl coenzyme-A dehydrogenase, NADP^{+}-linked acetoacetyl CoA reductase, NADPH:acetoacetyl-CoA reductase, D(−)-beta-hydroxybutyryl CoA-NADP^{+} oxidoreductase, short chain beta-ketoacetyl(acetoacetyl)-CoA reductase, beta-ketoacyl-CoA reductase, D-3-hydroxyacyl-CoA reductase, and (R)-3-hydroxyacyl-CoA dehydrogenase. This enzyme participates in butanoate metabolism.

== See also ==
- 3-hydroxyacyl-CoA dehydrogenase operating on the enantiomer of the substrate
