= Alpha-santonin 1,2-reductase =

Class of enzymes

alpha-santonin 1,2-reductase

Identifiers
- EC no.: 1.3.1.47
- CAS no.: 111070-23-6

Databases
- IntEnz: IntEnz view
- BRENDA: BRENDA entry
- ExPASy: NiceZyme view
- KEGG: KEGG entry
- MetaCyc: metabolic pathway
- PRIAM: profile
- PDB structures: RCSB PDB PDBe PDBsum
- Gene Ontology: AmiGO / QuickGO
Search
- PMC: articles
- PubMed: articles
- NCBI: proteins

In enzymology, alpha-santonin 1,2-reductase (EC 1.3.1.47) is an enzyme that catalyzes the chemical reaction

santonin
+ NADH
H^{+}
H^{+}
1,2-dihydrosantonin
+ NAD^{+}

The three substrates of this enzyme are santonin, reduced nicotinamide adenine dinucleotide (NADH), and a proton. Its products are 1,2-dihydrosantonin and oxidised NAD^{+}. The enzyme can also use nicotinamide adenine dinucleotide phosphate as an alternative cofactor.

This enzyme belongs to the family of oxidoreductases, specifically those acting on the CH-CH group of donor with NAD+ or NADP+ as acceptor. The systematic name of this enzyme class is 1,2-dihydrosantonin:NAD(P)+ 1,2-oxidoreductase.
