= HSD17B1 =

Protein-coding gene in the species Homo sapiens

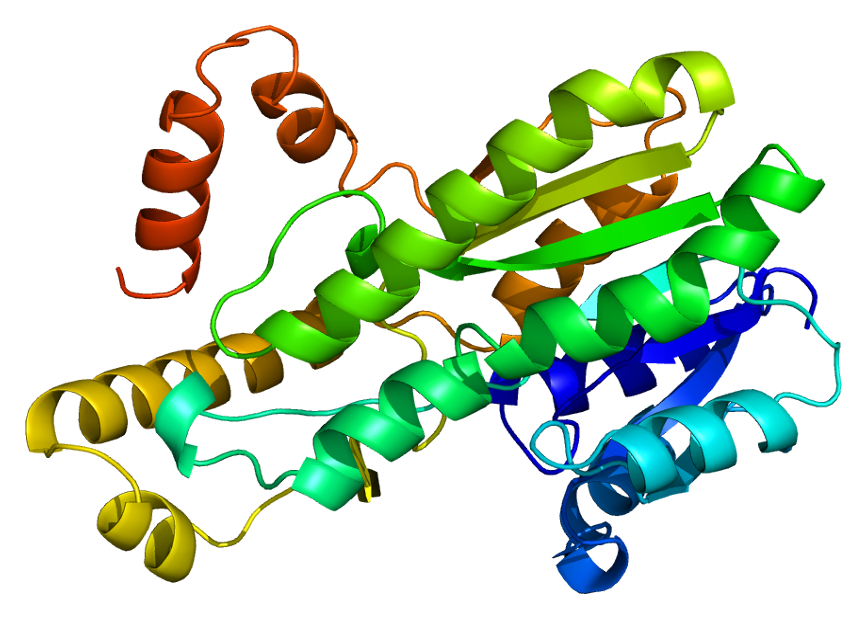

Identifiers
- Aliases: HSD17B1, EDH17B2, EDHB17, HSD17, SDR28C1, hydroxysteroid (17-beta) dehydrogenase 1, hydroxysteroid 17-beta dehydrogenase 1, E2DH, 17-beta-HSD, 20-alpha-HSD, Hsd17b1
- External IDs: OMIM: 109684; MGI: 105077; GeneCards: HSD17B1
Available structures
PDB	Ortholog search: PDBe RCSB
PDB	List of PDB id codes 1A27, 1BHS, 1DHT, 1EQU, 1FDS, 1FDT, 1FDU, 1FDV, 1FDW, 1I5R, 1IOL, 1JTV, 1QYV, 1QYW, 1QYX, 3DEY, 3DHE, 3HB4, 3HB5, 3KLM, 3KLP, 3KM0
Enzyme activity
EC #	BRENDA	ExPASy	KEGG	MetaCyc
1.1.1.51	↗	↗	↗	↗
1.1.1.62	↗	↗	↗	↗

Gene location (Human)
Chr.	Chromosome 17 (human)
Band	17q21.2	Start	42,552,922 bp
Band	17q21.2	End	42,555,214 bp

Gene location (Mouse)
Chr.	Chromosome 11 (mouse)
Band	11 D|11 64.17 cM	Start	100,969,237 bp
Band	11 D|11 64.17 cM	End	100,971,353 bp
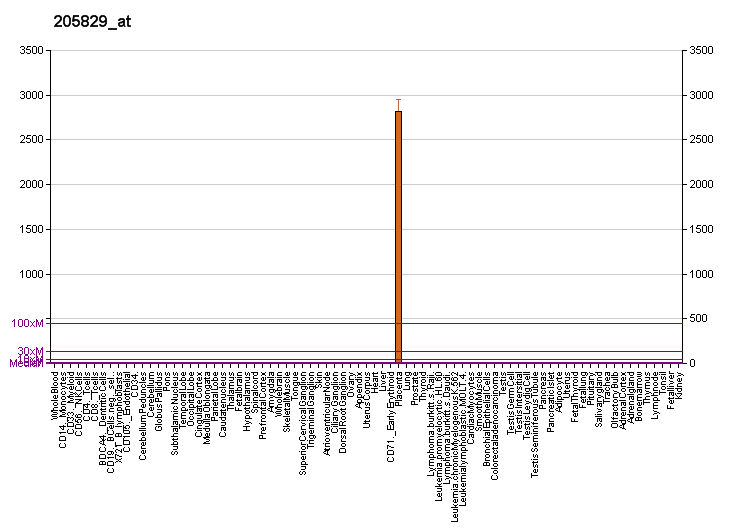
RNA expression pattern
Bgee	Human / Mouse (ortholog); Top expressed in: placenta; gonad; left ovary; skin of abdomen; skin of leg; right ovary; muscle of thigh; stromal cell of endometrium; mucosa of transverse colon; left coronary artery / Top expressed in: cumulus cell; Gonadal ridge; gastrula; morula; ovary; embryo; calvaria; blastocyst; granulocyte; primary oocyte; More reference expression data
BioGPS	More reference expression data
Gene ontology
Molecular function	oxidoreductase activity; catalytic activity; estradiol 17-beta-dehydrogenase activity; steroid binding; NADP+ binding; estradiol binding
Cellular component	cytoplasm; cytosol
Biological process	estrogen biosynthetic process; estrogen metabolic process; lipid metabolism; steroid biosynthetic process
Sources:Amigo / QuickGO
Orthologs
Databases	NCBI: entry; OMA: entry
Species	Human	Mouse
Entrez	3292	15485
Ensembl	ENSG00000108786	ENSMUSG00000019301
UniProt	P14061	P51656
RefSeq (mRNA)	NM_000413; NM_001330219	NM_010475
RefSeq (protein)	NP_000404; NP_001317148	NP_034605
Location (UCSC)	Chr 17: 42.55 – 42.56 Mb	Chr 11: 100.97 – 100.97 Mb
PubMed search
- Wikidata
View/Edit Human	View/Edit Mouse

17β-Hydroxysteroid dehydrogenase 1 (17β-HSD1) is an enzyme that in humans is encoded by the HSD17B1 gene. This enzyme oxidizes or reduces the C17 hydroxy/keto group of androgens and estrogens and hence is able to regulate the potency of these sex steroids

== Function ==
This enzyme is responsible for the interconversion of estrone (E1) and estradiol (E2) and for the interconversion of androstenedione and testosterone:

17β-estradiol + NADP^{+} + $\rightleftharpoons$ estrone + NADPH + H^{+}
testosterone + NADP^{+} + $\rightleftharpoons$ androstenedione + NADPH + H^{+}

The human 17β-HSD1 isozyme is highly specific for estrogens over androgens whereas the rodent isozyme is less specific.

== Discovery ==
Human 17β-HSD1 was the first enzyme of the 17β-HSD family to be cloned and to have its sequence identified. Its three-dimensional structure is also the first example of any human steroid-converting enzyme.

== Structure ==
This enzyme contains a short-chain dehydrogenase domain that contains a characteristic 3-layer (αβα) sandwich known as a Rossmann fold. The human enzyme contains 327 amino acids and exists as a homodimer with two identical subunits of 34.5 kDa The N-terminal short-chain dehydrogenase domain contains binding site for the NADP^{+}/NADPH cofactor. A narrow, hydrophobic C-terminal domain contains a binding pocket for the steroid substrate.

== Clinical significance ==
Estradiol stimulates while dihydrotestosterone (DHT) inhibits breast cancer growth. Furthermore 17β-HSD1 levels positively correlate with estradiol and negatively correlate with DHT levels in breast cancer cells. Hence 17β-HSD1 represents a possible drug target for breast cancer treatment.

== Inhibitors ==
- Linustedastat

== See also ==
- 17β-Hydroxysteroid dehydrogenase
