= Acyl-CoA oxidase 2 =

Enzyme found in humans

ACOX2

Identifiers
- Aliases: ACOX2, BCOX, BRCACOX, BRCOX, THCCox, acyl-CoA oxidase 2, branched chain, acyl-CoA oxidase 2, CBAS6
- External IDs: OMIM: 601641; MGI: 1934852; GeneCards: ACOX2
Enzyme activity
EC #	BRENDA	ExPASy	KEGG	MetaCyc
1.3.3.6	↗	↗	↗	↗

Gene location (Human)
Chr.	Chromosome 3 (human)
Band	3p14.3	Start	58,505,136 bp
Band	3p14.3	End	58,537,283 bp

Gene location (Mouse)
Chr.	Chromosome 14 (mouse)
Band	14|14 A1	Start	14,210,420 bp
Band	14|14 A1	End	14,244,262 bp
RNA expression pattern
Bgee	Human / Mouse (ortholog); Top expressed in: right lobe of liver; testicle; apex of heart; right lobe of thyroid gland; left lobe of thyroid gland; muscle layer of sigmoid colon; kidney tubule; human kidney; gastric mucosa; right auricle of heart / Top expressed in: left lobe of liver; right kidney; human kidney; proximal tubule; skin of external ear; esophagus; lip; olfactory epithelium; pyloric antrum; outer renal medulla; More reference expression data
BioGPS	n/a
Gene ontology
Molecular function	oxidoreductase activity, acting on the CH-CH group of donors; acyl-CoA oxidase activity; pristanoyl-CoA oxidase activity; oxidoreductase activity; signaling receptor binding; protein homodimerization activity; 3alpha,7alpha,12alpha-trihydroxy-5beta-cholestanoyl-CoA 24-hydroxylase activity; FAD binding; acyl-CoA dehydrogenase activity; flavin adenine dinucleotide binding; fatty acid binding
Cellular component	intracellular membrane-bounded organelle; peroxisomal matrix; peroxisome; cytosol
Biological process	lipid metabolism; fatty acid metabolic process; fatty acid beta-oxidation; bile acid biosynthetic process; positive regulation of cell death; positive regulation of response to oxidative stress; fatty acid beta-oxidation using acyl-CoA oxidase; fatty acid beta-oxidation using acyl-CoA dehydrogenase; protein targeting to peroxisome; lipid homeostasis
Sources:Amigo / QuickGO
Orthologs
Databases	NCBI: entry; OMA: entry
Species	Human	Mouse
Entrez	8309	93732
Ensembl	ENSG00000168306	ENSMUSG00000021751
UniProt	Q99424	Q9QXD1
RefSeq (mRNA)	NM_003500	NM_001161667; NM_053115
RefSeq (protein)	NP_003491	NP_001155139; NP_444345
Location (UCSC)	Chr 3: 58.51 – 58.54 Mb	Chr 14: 14.21 – 14.24 Mb
PubMed search
- Wikidata
View/Edit Human	View/Edit Mouse

Acyl-CoA oxidase 2 is an enzyme that in humans is encoded by the gene ACOX2. Like its relatives ACOX1 and ACOX3, this enzyme is involved in the process of breaking down lipids in the peroxisomes (called peroxisomal beta oxidation). ACOX2 specifically acts on branched-chain fatty acids and intermediates of bile acid metabolism, and displays some overlap with ACOX3 in the types of lipids it acts on.

== Background and Function ==
Peroxisomal beta oxidation is a process that breaks down certain lipids like very long chain fatty acid (22 or more carbons), branched-chain fatty acid, and some bile acid intermediates. Chemically, this follows essentially the same steps as mitochondrial beta oxidation but utilizes different enzymes.

Acyl-CoA oxidases (EC 1.3.3.6), like ACOX2, serve as the peroxisomal analogues to mitochondrial acyl-CoA dehydrogenase, and catalyze reactions of the form:

a 2,3-saturated acyl-CoA + O_{2} = a (2E)-enoyl-CoA + H_{2}O_{2}

This differs from the mitochondrial reaction in its production of hydrogen peroxide, which is a characteristic feature of peroxisome pathways that gives the organelle its name.

ACOX2 differs from the other two types of acyl-CoA oxidase found in humans by the specific lipids it acts on. In the liver, it is part of peroxisomal bile acid synthesis through its action of C27-bile acid intermediates. In brown adipose tissue, it acts on monomethyl branched-chain fatty acids, which is part of how the body adapts to cold temperatures.

== Medical Significance ==
Pathogenic mutations in ACOX2 are associated with a bile acid synthesis disorder that causes an accumulation of C27 bile acids and high levels of transaminase in the blood, called congenital bile acid synthesis defect-6 (CBAS6). Some of those affected have also had more serious symptoms, but whether there is a causal link is not clear due to confounding factors.
