= HSD17B2 =

Protein-coding gene in the species Homo sapiens

Identifiers
- Aliases: HSD17B2, EDH17B2, HSD17, SDR9C2, hydroxysteroid (17-beta) dehydrogenase 2, hydroxysteroid 17-beta dehydrogenase 2
- External IDs: OMIM: 109685; MGI: 1096386; GeneCards: HSD17B2
Enzyme activity
EC #	BRENDA	ExPASy	KEGG	MetaCyc
1.1.1.62	↗	↗	↗	↗
1.1.1.239	↗	↗	↗	↗

Gene location (Human)
Chr.	Chromosome 16 (human)
Band	16q23.3	Start	82,035,004 bp
Band	16q23.3	End	82,098,534 bp

Gene location (Mouse)
Chr.	Chromosome 8 (mouse)
Band	8|8 E1	Start	118,428,643 bp
Band	8|8 E1	End	118,485,766 bp
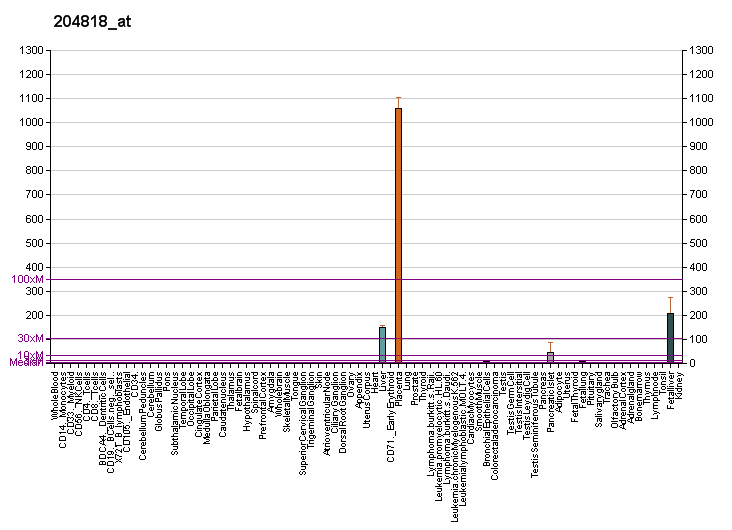
RNA expression pattern
Bgee	Human / Mouse (ortholog); Top expressed in: jejunal mucosa; duodenum; mucosa of transverse colon; mucosa of ileum; right lobe of liver; rectum; placenta; mucosa of urinary bladder; mucosa of sigmoid colon; olfactory zone of nasal mucosa / Top expressed in: left lobe of liver; transitional epithelium of urinary bladder; left colon; esophagus; pyloric antrum; yolk sac; ileum; epithelium of stomach; jejunum; corneal stroma; More reference expression data
BioGPS	More reference expression data
Gene ontology
Molecular function	oxidoreductase activity; testosterone dehydrogenase (NAD+) activity; 17-alpha,20-alpha-dihydroxypregn-4-en-3-one dehydrogenase activity; estradiol 17-beta-dehydrogenase activity
Cellular component	integral component of membrane; endoplasmic reticulum membrane; membrane
Biological process	in utero embryonic development; response to retinoic acid; steroid biosynthetic process; placenta development; lipid metabolism; estrogen biosynthetic process
Sources:Amigo / QuickGO
Orthologs
Databases	NCBI: entry; OMA: entry
Species	Human	Mouse
Entrez	3294	15486
Ensembl	ENSG00000086696	ENSMUSG00000031844
UniProt	P37059	P51658
RefSeq (mRNA)	NM_002153	NM_008290
RefSeq (protein)	NP_002144	NP_032316
Location (UCSC)	Chr 16: 82.04 – 82.1 Mb	Chr 8: 118.43 – 118.49 Mb
PubMed search
- Wikidata
View/Edit Human	View/Edit Mouse

17β-Hydroxysteroid dehydrogenase 2 (17β-HSD2) is an enzyme of the 17β-hydroxysteroid dehydrogenase (17β-HSD) family that in humans is encoded by the HSD17B2 gene.

== Function ==
17β-HSD2 is involved in inactivation of androgens and estrogens, being accurately describable as "antiandrogenic" and "antiestrogenic", and is the key 17β-HSD isozyme in androgen and estrogen inactivation. Specific reactions catalyzed by 17β-HSD2 include estradiol to estrone, testosterone to androstenedione, and androstenediol to DHEA. In addition to 17β-HSD activity, this enzyme also shows high 20α-hydroxysteroid dehydrogenase activity and can activate the weak progestogen 20α-hydroxyprogesterone into the potent progestogen progesterone.

== Expression ==
17β-HSD2 is widely expressed throughout the body including in the placenta, liver, intestines, endometrium, kidney, pancreas, breast, prostate, bone, and many other tissues.

== Clinical significance ==
Polymorphisms in HSD17B2 have been associated with breast cancer and prostate cancer. 17β-HSD2 activity has also been associated with endometriosis and osteoporosis, and inhibitors of the enzyme are of potential interest in the treatment of the latter condition. Inactivating mutations resulting in a syndrome of congenital deficiency of 17β-HSD2 have not been reported to date.
