= Linustedastat =

Investigational drug under development for treatment of endometriosis

Clinical data
- Other names: FOR-6219; OG-6219; 3-[(17E)-4-Fluoro-17-(hydroxyimino)estra-1,3,5(10)-trien-15β-yl]-N-(5-fluoropyridin-2-yl)propanamide

Identifiers
- IUPAC name: 3-[(8R,9S,13S,14S,15R,17E)-4-fluoro-17-hydroxyimino-13-methyl-7,8,9,11,12,14,15,16-octahydro-6H-cyclopenta[a]phenanthren-15-yl]-N-(5-fluoropyridin-2-yl)propanamide
- CAS Number: 2254299-48-2
- PubChem CID: 171390018
- ChemSpider: 133325688
- UNII: PP3PLL7GZY
- KEGG: D13078

Chemical and physical data
- Formula: C_{26}H_{29}F_{2}N_{3}O_{2}
- Molar mass: 453.534 g·mol^{−1}
- 3D model (JSmol): Interactive image
- SMILES: C[C@]1\2CC[C@H]3[C@H]([C@@H]1[C@@H](C/C2=N\O)CCC(=O)NC4=NC=C(C=C4)F)CCC5=C3C=CC=C5F
- InChI: InChI=1S/C26H29F2N3O2/c1-26-12-11-18-17-3-2-4-21(28)19(17)7-8-20(18)25(26)15(13-22(26)31-33)5-10-24(32)30-23-9-6-16(27)14-29-23/h2-4,6,9,14-15,18,20,25,33H,5,7-8,10-13H2,1H3,(H,29,30,32)/b31-22+/t15-,18-,20-,25+,26-/m1/s1; Key:RMMVCLGAUPAFAI-MLXDORPZSA-N

Linustedastat (developmental code names FOR-6219 and OG-6219) is a 17β-hydroxysteroid dehydrogenase 1 (17β-HSD1; HSD17B1) inhibitor which is under development for the treatment of endometriosis. It is a steroidal compound derived from estrone and works by preventing the formation of the more potent estrogen estradiol from the minimally active precursor estrone. This in turn results in antiestrogenic effects that may be useful in the treatment of estrogen-dependent conditions. As of November 2023, the drug is in phase 2 clinical trials for endometriosis. It is also under preclinical investigation for treatment of breast cancer and endometrial cancer.
