= Amino acid oxidoreductases =

Amino acid oxidoreductases are oxidoreductases, a type of enzyme, that act upon amino acids.

They constitute the majority of enzymes classified under EC number 1.4, with most of the remainder being monoamine oxidases.

Examples include:

- Glutamate dehydrogenase
- Nitric oxide synthase
