= Hydroxyacyl-Coenzyme A dehydrogenase =

Protein-coding gene in the species Homo sapiens

HADH
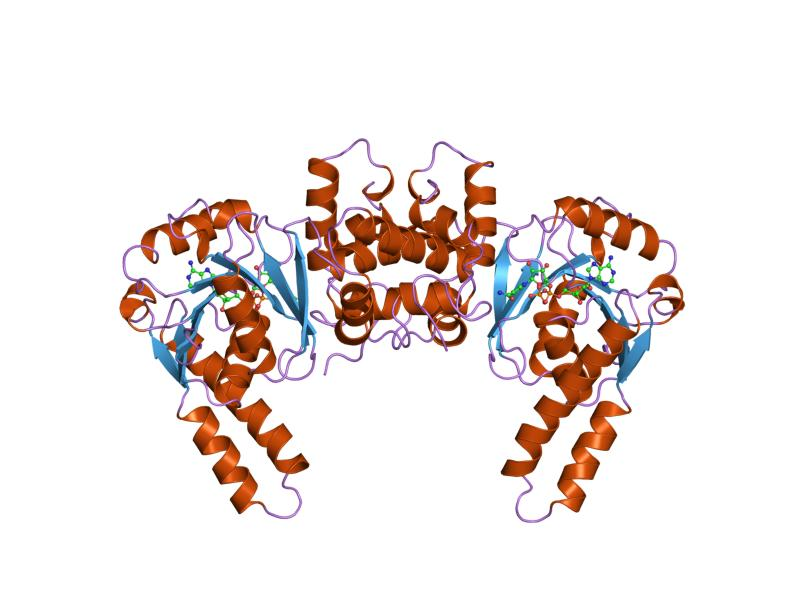

Identifiers
- Aliases: HADH, HAD, HADH1, HADHSC, HCDH, HHF4, MSCHAD, SCHAD, Hydroxyacyl-Coenzyme A dehydrogenase, hydroxyacyl-CoA dehydrogenase
- External IDs: OMIM: 601609; MGI: 96009; GeneCards: HADH
Available structures
PDB	Ortholog search: PDBe RCSB
PDB	List of PDB id codes 1F0Y, 1F12, 1F14, 1F17, 1IL0, 1LSJ, 1LSO, 1M75, 1M76, 2HDH, 3HAD, 3RQS
Enzyme activity
EC #	BRENDA	ExPASy	KEGG	MetaCyc
1.1.1.35	↗	↗	↗	↗

Gene location (Human)
Chr.	Chromosome 4 (human)
Band	4q25	Start	107,989,714 bp
Band	4q25	End	108,035,241 bp

Gene location (Mouse)
Chr.	Chromosome 3 (mouse)
Band	3|3 G3	Start	131,027,068 bp
Band	3|3 G3	End	131,065,750 bp
RNA expression pattern
Bgee	Human / Mouse (ortholog); Top expressed in: islet of Langerhans; right ventricle; Skeletal muscle tissue of rectus abdominis; mucosa of transverse colon; beta cell; thoracic diaphragm; kidney tubule; vastus lateralis muscle; body of tongue; myocardium of left ventricle / Top expressed in: Paneth cell; condyle; medullary collecting duct; tunica adventitia of aorta; brown adipose tissue; cumulus cell; atrioventricular junction; fossa; migratory enteric neural crest cell; renal corpuscle; More reference expression data
BioGPS	n/a
Gene ontology
Molecular function	oxidoreductase activity; 3-hydroxyacyl-CoA dehydrogenase activity; NAD+ binding
Cellular component	cytoplasm; mitochondrial matrix; mitochondrion; nucleoplasm
Biological process	response to insulin; response to hormone; fatty acid beta-oxidation; negative regulation of insulin secretion; response to activity; fatty acid metabolic process; lipid metabolism; positive regulation of cold-induced thermogenesis
Sources:Amigo / QuickGO
Orthologs
Databases	NCBI: entry; OMA: entry
Species	Human	Mouse
Entrez	3033	15107
Ensembl	ENSG00000138796	ENSMUSG00000027984
UniProt	Q16836	Q61425
RefSeq (mRNA)	NM_001184705; NM_005327; NM_001331027	NM_008212
RefSeq (protein)	NP_001171634; NP_001317956; NP_005318	NP_032238
Location (UCSC)	Chr 4: 107.99 – 108.04 Mb	Chr 3: 131.03 – 131.07 Mb
PubMed search
- Wikidata
View/Edit Human	View/Edit Mouse

Hydroxyacyl-Coenzyme A dehydrogenase (HADH) is an enzyme which in humans is encoded by the HADH gene.

== Structure ==
The HADH gene is located on the 4th chromosome, with its specific location being identified as 4q22-q26. The gene has 10 exons. The HADH gene encodes a 34.3 kDa protein that has 314 amino acids and 124 observed peptides.

== Function ==
This gene is a member of the 3-hydroxyacyl-CoA dehydrogenase gene family. The encoded protein functions in the mitochondrial matrix to catalyze the oxidation of straight-chain 3-hydroxyacyl-CoAs as part of the beta-oxidation pathway. Its enzymatic activity is highest with medium-chain-length fatty acids.

== Clinical significance ==
Mutations in this gene cause one form of familial hyperinsulinemic hypoglycemia. A deficiency is associated with 3-hydroxyacyl-coenzyme A dehydrogenase deficiency. Mutations also cause 3-hydroxyacyl-CoA dehydrogenase deficiency. There are a wide variety of mutations that have been identified to cause this disease. Among them are missense mutations (A40T, P258L, D57G, Y226H) and nonsense mutations (R236X) in the protein, and splicing mutations (261+1G>A, 710-2A>G) and some small deletions (587delC) in the cDNA. One mutation, 636+471G>T in the HADH gene, was shown to create a cryptic splice donor site and an out-of-frame pseudoexon. Most of the described cases have homozygous mutations. This disease has fairly homogenous clinical presentation across cases. The symptoms first appear in early life, between 1.5 hours post birth and 3 years of age, and the most common symptoms are hypoglycemia and seizures/convulsions directly related to the hypoglycemia. There are other clinical presentations that have been identified, namely: myoglobinuria, dicarboxylic aciduria, feeding difficulties in infancy, muscular hypotonia, hepatic steatosis, growth delay, hypertrophic cardiomyopathy, dilated cardiomyopathy, hepatic necrosis, and fulminant hepatic failure. The disorder may be diagnosed by either the analysis of the molecular genetics of the individual, or by detection of abnormal metabolite levels in blood and/or plasma. Individuals with this deficiency have an elevated amount of 3-hydroxyglutarate excreted through the urine; a heightened level of C4-OH acylcarnitine in the blood plasma is also a characteristic of this FAO disorder. Most documented cases thus far have shown that individuals are responsive to diazoxide treatment, and highlight the need for diagnosis and treatment administration as early as possible in order to correct hypoglycemia and avoid irreversible brain damage.

== Interactions ==
HADH has been shown to interact with Vpr, such that HIV-1 Vpr regulates mitochondrial respiration and enhances the activity of hydroxyacyl-CoA dehydrogenase (HADH) through PPARbeta/delta.

== See also ==
- 3-hydroxyacyl-CoA dehydrogenase
- hydroxyacyl-CoA dehydrogenase/3-ketoacyl-CoA thiolase/enoyl-CoA hydratase (trifunctional protein), alpha subunit
