= Peroxisomal bifunctional enzyme =

EHHADH

Identifiers
- Aliases: EHHADH, ECHD, FRTS3, L-PBE, LBFP, LBP, PBFE, enoyl-CoA, hydratase/3-hydroxyacyl CoA dehydrogenase, enoyl-CoA hydratase and 3-hydroxyacyl CoA dehydrogenase, MFE1
- External IDs: OMIM: 607037; MGI: 1277964; GeneCards: EHHADH
Enzyme activity
EC #	BRENDA	ExPASy	KEGG	MetaCyc
1.1.1.35	↗	↗	↗	↗
4.2.1.17	↗	↗	↗	↗
5.3.3.8	↗	↗	↗	↗

Gene location (Human)
Chr.	Chromosome 3 (human)
Band	3q27.2	Start	185,190,624 bp
Band	3q27.2	End	185,281,990 bp

Gene location (Mouse)
Chr.	Chromosome 16 (mouse)
Band	16|16 B1	Start	21,580,037 bp
Band	16|16 B1	End	21,606,557 bp
RNA expression pattern
Bgee	Human / Mouse (ortholog); Top expressed in: right lobe of liver; kidney tubule; jejunal mucosa; glomerulus; metanephric glomerulus; renal medulla; human kidney; Epithelium of choroid plexus; mucosa of transverse colon; gonad / Top expressed in: right kidney; human kidney; left lobe of liver; parotid gland; proximal tubule; duodenum; jejunum; brown adipose tissue; yolk sac; epithelium of stomach; More reference expression data
BioGPS	n/a
Gene ontology
Molecular function	dodecenoyl-CoA delta-isomerase activity; signaling receptor binding; catalytic activity; lyase activity; isomerase activity; enoyl-CoA hydratase activity; oxidoreductase activity; protein binding; enzyme binding; long-chain-enoyl-CoA hydratase activity; 3-hydroxyacyl-CoA dehydrogenase activity; nucleotide binding; GTP binding; structural constituent of cytoskeleton; GTPase activity
Cellular component	peroxisome; peroxisomal matrix; cytosol; cytoplasm; microtubule; cytoskeleton; microtubule cytoskeleton
Biological process	fatty acid metabolic process; internal protein amino acid acetylation; metabolism; lipid metabolism; fatty acid beta-oxidation; fatty acid beta-oxidation using acyl-CoA oxidase; protein targeting to peroxisome; microtubule-based process; cytoskeleton organization; microtubule cytoskeleton organization; mitotic cell cycle
Sources:Amigo / QuickGO
Orthologs
Databases	NCBI: entry; OMA: entry
Species	Human	Mouse
Entrez	1962	74147
Ensembl	ENSG00000113790	ENSMUSG00000022853
UniProt	Q08426; Q9NY65	Q9DBM2
RefSeq (mRNA)	NM_001166415; NM_001966	NM_023737
RefSeq (protein)	NP_001159887; NP_001957; NP_001180343; NP_061816	NP_076226
Location (UCSC)	Chr 3: 185.19 – 185.28 Mb	Chr 16: 21.58 – 21.61 Mb
PubMed search
- Wikidata
View/Edit Human	View/Edit Mouse

Peroxisomal bifunctional enzyme is an enzyme that in humans is encoded by the gene EHHADH. This is a bifunctional enzyme and is one of the four enzymes of the peroxisomal beta-oxidation pathway. Mutations of the gene are a cause of peroxisomal disorders such as Zellweger syndrome.

== 3-Hydroxyacyl ACP dehydratase activity ==
Peroxisomal bifunctional enzyme is able to act as a Enoyl-CoA hydratase which is involved in the breakdown of fatty acids in the peroxisomes.

== See also ==
- HSD17B4
