= HSD17B8 =

Protein-coding gene in the species Homo sapiens

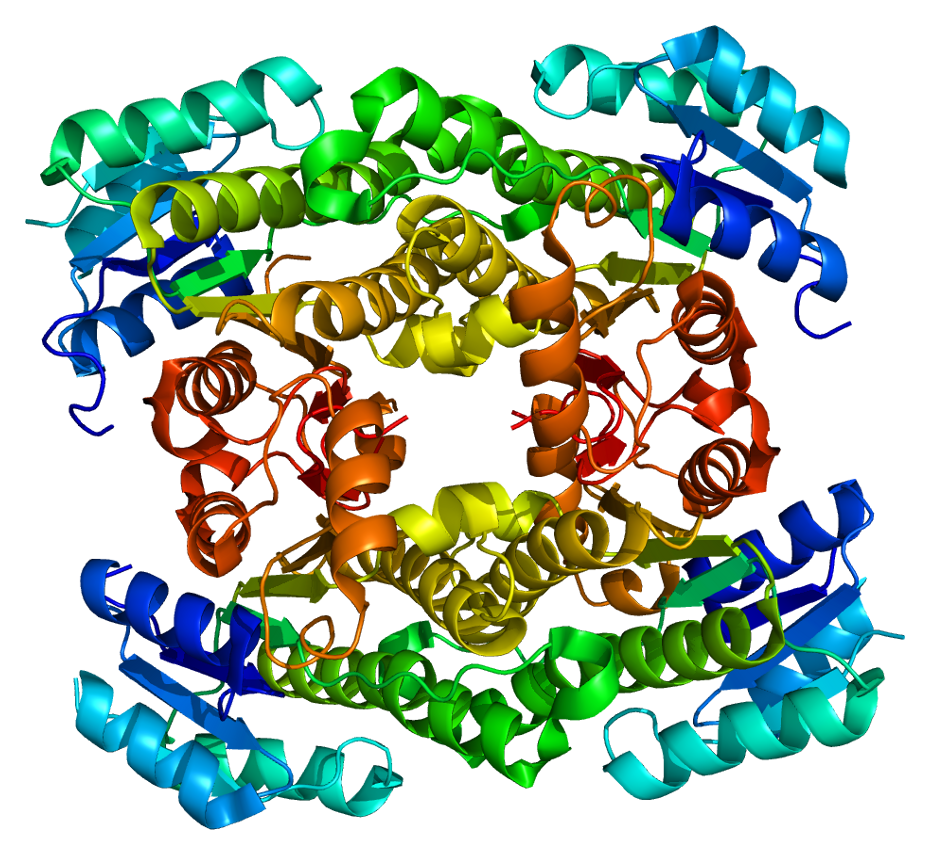

Identifiers
- Aliases: HSD17B8, D6S2245E, FABG, FABGL, H2-KE6, HKE6, KE6, RING2, SDR30C1, dJ1033B10.9, hydroxysteroid (17-beta) dehydrogenase 8, hydroxysteroid 17-beta dehydrogenase 8
- External IDs: OMIM: 601417; MGI: 95911; GeneCards: HSD17B8
Available structures
PDB	Ortholog search: PDBe RCSB
PDB	List of PDB id codes 2PD6, 4CQL, 4CQM
Enzyme activity
EC #	BRENDA	ExPASy	KEGG	MetaCyc
1.1.1.62	↗	↗	↗	↗
1.1.1.239	↗	↗	↗	↗

Gene location (Human)
Chr.	Chromosome 6 (human)
Band	6p21.32	Start	33,204,655 bp
Band	6p21.32	End	33,206,831 bp

Gene location (Mouse)
Chr.	Chromosome 17 (mouse)
Band	17 B1|17 17.98 cM	Start	34,245,007 bp
Band	17 B1|17 17.98 cM	End	34,247,034 bp
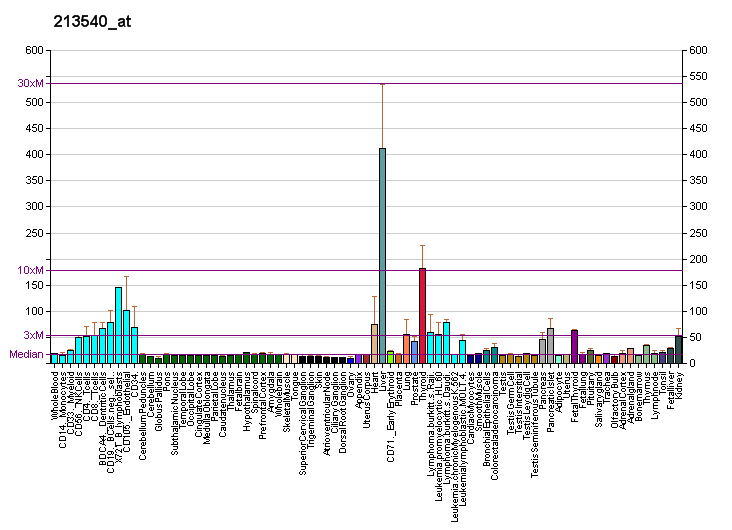
RNA expression pattern
Bgee	Human / Mouse (ortholog); Top expressed in: body of pancreas; right lobe of liver; right uterine tube; testicle; mucosa of transverse colon; right adrenal gland; human kidney; right adrenal cortex; left lobe of thyroid gland; right lobe of thyroid gland / Top expressed in: adrenal gland; proximal tubule; right kidney; islet of Langerhans; human kidney; neural layer of retina; granulocyte; white adipose tissue; bone marrow; urinary bladder; More reference expression data
BioGPS	More reference expression data
Gene ontology
Molecular function	oxidoreductase activity; estradiol 17-beta-dehydrogenase activity; protein binding; testosterone dehydrogenase (NAD+) activity; 3-hydroxyacyl-CoA dehydrogenase activity; 3-oxoacyl-[acyl-carrier-protein reductase (NADH) activity]; NADH binding; oxidoreductase activity, acting on the CH-OH group of donors, NAD or NADP as acceptor
Cellular component	plasma membrane; mitochondrial envelope; membrane; mitochondrion; mitochondrial matrix
Biological process	estrogen biosynthetic process; estrogen metabolic process; androgen metabolic process; fatty acid metabolic process; lipid metabolism; steroid biosynthetic process; fatty acid biosynthetic process; protein heterotetramerization; fatty-acyl-CoA biosynthetic process
Sources:Amigo / QuickGO
Orthologs
Databases	NCBI: entry; OMA: entry
Species	Human	Mouse
Entrez	7923	14979
Ensembl	ENSG00000204228; ENSG00000228357; ENSG00000225312; ENSG00000232357; ENSG00000112474 ENSG00000228712	ENSMUSG00000073422
UniProt	Q92506	P50171
RefSeq (mRNA)	NM_014234	NM_013543
RefSeq (protein)	NP_055049	NP_038571
Location (UCSC)	Chr 6: 33.2 – 33.21 Mb	Chr 17: 34.25 – 34.25 Mb
PubMed search
- Wikidata
View/Edit Human	View/Edit Mouse

Estradiol 17 beta-dehydrogenase 8 is an enzyme that in humans is encoded by the HSD17B8 gene.

In mice, the Ke6 protein is a 17-beta-hydroxysteroid dehydrogenase that can regulate the concentration of biologically active estrogens and androgens. It is preferentially an oxidative enzyme and inactivates estradiol, testosterone, and dihydrotestosterone. However, the enzyme has some reductive activity and can synthesize estradiol from estrone. The protein encoded by this gene is similar to Ke6 and is a member of the short-chain dehydrogenase superfamily. An alternatively spliced transcript of this gene has been detected, but the full-length nature of this variant has not been determined.
