= HSD17B14 =

Protein-coding gene in the species Homo sapiens

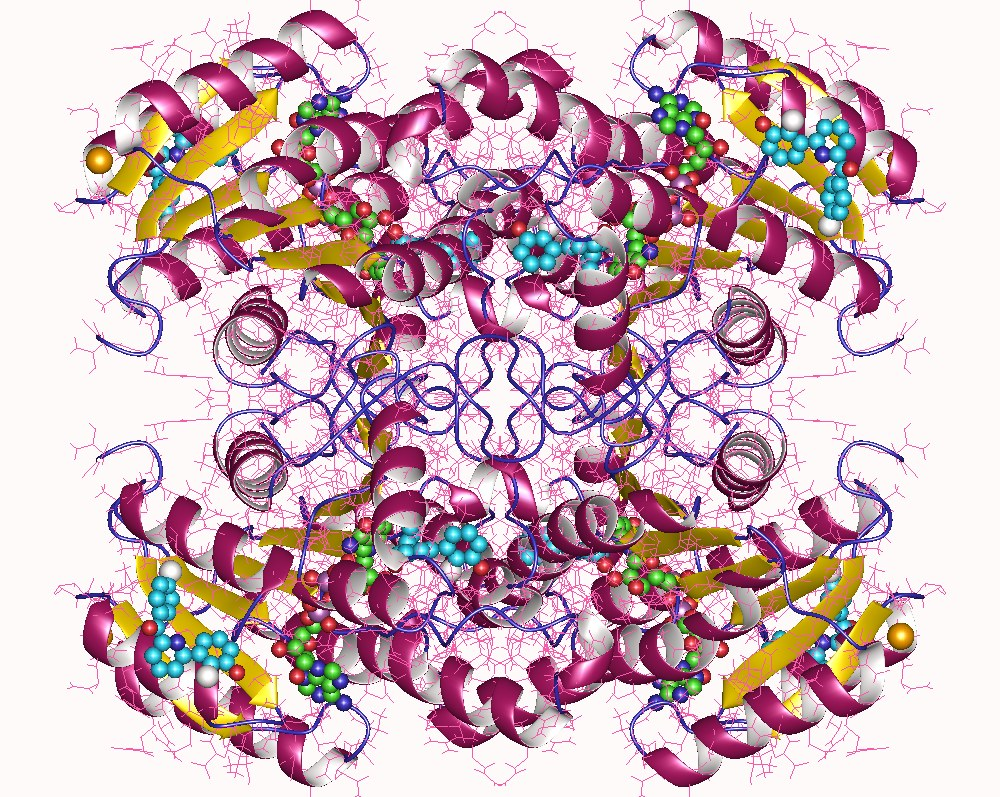

Identifiers
- Aliases: HSD17B14, DHRS10, SDR47C1, retSDR3, hydroxysteroid (17-beta) dehydrogenase 14, hydroxysteroid 17-beta dehydrogenase 14
- External IDs: OMIM: 612832; MGI: 1913315; GeneCards: HSD17B14
Available structures
PDB	Human UniProt search: PDBe RCSB
PDB	List of PDB id codes 1YDE, 5ICS, 5ICM, 5JS6, 5HS6, 5JSF
Enzyme activity
EC #	BRENDA	ExPASy	KEGG	MetaCyc
1.1.1.122	↗	↗	↗	↗

Gene location (Human)
Chr.	Chromosome 19 (human)
Band	19q13.33	Start	48,813,018 bp
Band	19q13.33	End	48,836,510 bp

Gene location (Mouse)
Chr.	Chromosome 7 (mouse)
Band	7|7 B3	Start	45,204,317 bp
Band	7|7 B3	End	45,217,176 bp
RNA expression pattern
Bgee	Human / Mouse (ortholog); Top expressed in: gastric mucosa; right adrenal cortex; right lobe of liver; left ovary; left adrenal cortex; nucleus accumbens; testicle; right ovary; right hemisphere of cerebellum; caudate nucleus / Top expressed in: morula; blastocyst; lip; transitional epithelium of urinary bladder; embryo; muscle of thigh; esophagus; gastrula; blood; right kidney; More reference expression data
BioGPS	n/a
Gene ontology
Molecular function	oxidoreductase activity; protein binding; testosterone 17-beta-dehydrogenase (NADP+) activity; identical protein binding; estradiol 17-beta-dehydrogenase activity
Cellular component	cytoplasm; cytosol
Biological process	steroid metabolic process; steroid catabolic process; lipid metabolism; estrogen biosynthetic process
Sources:Amigo / QuickGO
Orthologs
Databases	NCBI: entry; OMA: entry
Species	Human	Mouse
Entrez	51171	66065
Ensembl	ENSG00000087076	ENSMUSG00000030825
UniProt	Q9BPX1	n/a
RefSeq (mRNA)	NM_016246	NM_025330
RefSeq (protein)	NP_057330	n/a
Location (UCSC)	Chr 19: 48.81 – 48.84 Mb	Chr 7: 45.2 – 45.22 Mb
PubMed search
- Wikidata
View/Edit Human	View/Edit Mouse

17β-Hydroxysteroid dehydrogenase type 14 also known as 17β-HSD type 14 or 17βHSD14 is an enzyme that in humans is encoded by the HSD17B14 gene.

17βHSD14 catalyzes the stereospecific oxidation and reduction of the 17β carbon atom of androgens and estrogens using NAD(P)(H) as a cofactor. It is primarily expressed in glandular epithelial tissues of breast, ovary, and testis.
