= HSD17B3 =

Protein-coding gene in the species Homo sapiens

Identifiers
- Aliases: HSD17B3, EDH17B3, SDR12C2, hydroxysteroid (17-beta) dehydrogenase 3, hydroxysteroid 17-beta dehydrogenase 3
- External IDs: OMIM: 605573; MGI: 107177; GeneCards: HSD17B3
Enzyme activity
EC #	BRENDA	ExPASy	KEGG	MetaCyc
1.1.1.62	↗	↗	↗	↗
1.1.1.64	↗	↗	↗	↗

Gene location (Human)
Chr.	Chromosome 9 (human)
Band	9q22.32	Start	96,235,306 bp
Band	9q22.32	End	96,302,176 bp

Gene location (Mouse)
Chr.	Chromosome 13 (mouse)
Band	13|13 B3	Start	64,206,080 bp
Band	13|13 B3	End	64,237,044 bp
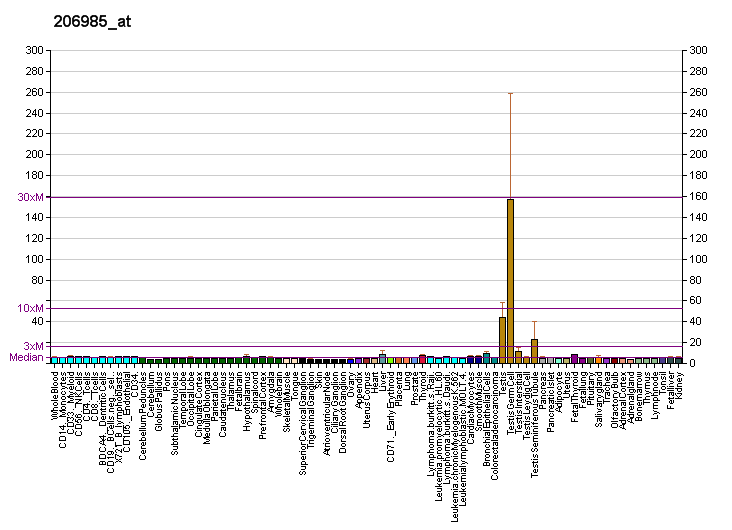
RNA expression pattern
Bgee	Human / Mouse (ortholog); Top expressed in: right testis; left testis; testicle; right lobe of liver; C1 segment; tibial nerve; substantia nigra; gastric mucosa; left lobe of thyroid gland; olfactory zone of nasal mucosa / Top expressed in: Gonadal ridge; testicle; embryo; spermatocyte; seminiferous tubule; embryo; right ventricle; gastrula; blastocyst; adrenal gland; More reference expression data
BioGPS	More reference expression data
Gene ontology
Molecular function	testosterone 17-beta-dehydrogenase (NADP+) activity; oxidoreductase activity; testosterone dehydrogenase (NAD+) activity; testosterone dehydrogenase [NAD(P) activity]
Cellular component	endoplasmic reticulum membrane; intracellular membrane-bounded organelle; endoplasmic reticulum
Biological process	testosterone biosynthetic process; steroid biosynthetic process; lipid metabolism; androgen biosynthetic process; male genitalia development
Sources:Amigo / QuickGO
Orthologs
Databases	NCBI: entry; OMA: entry
Species	Human	Mouse
Entrez	3293	15487
Ensembl	ENSG00000130948	ENSMUSG00000033122
UniProt	P37058; Q6FH62	P70385
RefSeq (mRNA)	NM_000197	NM_008291
RefSeq (protein)	NP_000188; NP_000188.1	NP_032317
Location (UCSC)	Chr 9: 96.24 – 96.3 Mb	Chr 13: 64.21 – 64.24 Mb
PubMed search
- Wikidata
View/Edit Human	View/Edit Mouse

17β-Hydroxysteroid dehydrogenase 3 (17β-HSD3) is an enzyme that in humans is encoded by the HSD17B3 gene and is involved in androgen steroidogenesis.

== Function ==
This isoform of 17β-HSD is expressed predominantly in the testis and catalyzes the conversion of androstenedione to testosterone. It preferentially uses NADP as cofactor. Deficiency can result in impaired virilization of genetically male infants, formerly termed male pseudohermaphroditism.

== See also ==
- 17β-Hydroxysteroid dehydrogenase
