= Acyl-CoA oxidase deficiency =

- Other names: ACOX1 deficiency
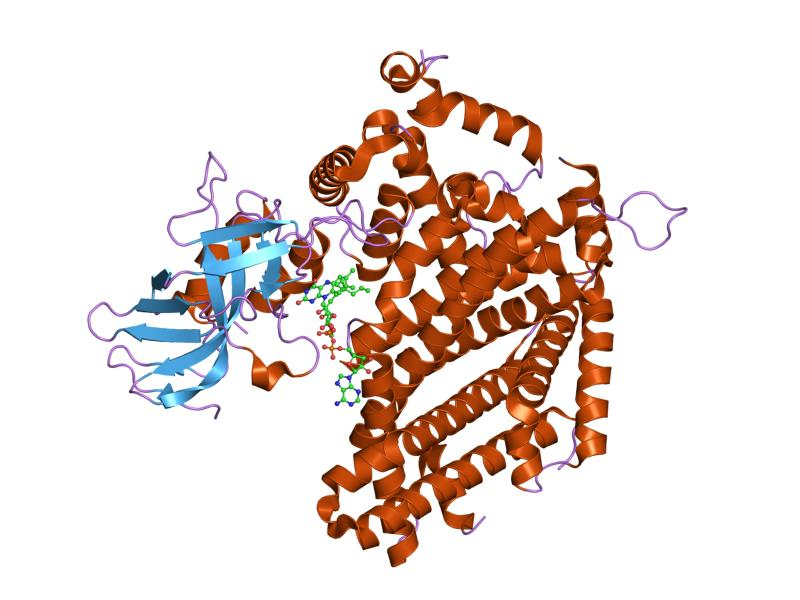
- Acyl CoA oxidase enzyme
- Specialty: Medical genetics

Acyl-CoA oxidase deficiency is a rare genetic disorder that leads to significant damage and deterioration of nervous system functions (neurodegeneration). It is caused by pathogenic variants in ACOX1, which codes for the production of an enzyme called peroxisomal straight-chain acyl-CoA oxidase (ACOX1). It is responsible for the breakdown of very long chain fatty acids (VLCFAs).

Defective function of the ACOX1 enzyme prevents proper breakdown of VLCFAs, leading to their accumulation and interference with the nervous system. Acyl-CoA oxidase deficiency's symptoms begin at birth, and most affected newborns do not survive past early childhood. Affected individuals can be born with hypotonia, seizures, and dysmorphic features, such as widely spaced eyes, a low nasal bridge and low set ears. Polydactyly and hepatomegaly have also been described. Most babies will learn to walk and begin speaking, before experiencing a rapid decline in motor function between the ages of 1 and 3. As the person ages, and the conditions worsens, they begin to experience exaggerated reflexes (hyperreflexia), more severe and frequent seizures, and gradual loss of vision and hearing. There is no cure, however, a range of symptom-based treatments are used to provide supportive care.

== Signs and symptoms ==
Symptoms of ACOX1 deficiency appear at birth. In the early stages these can appear quite mild; weak muscle tone (often extreme hypotonia), lack of neonatal reflexes, seizures and abnormal (dysmorphic) facial features such as widely spaced eyes, a low nasal bridge, low set ears and an abnormally large forehead. Symptoms worsen progressively over time due to the build-up of VLCFAs. Children can often reach the stage at which they begin to walk and talk, before experiencing a rapid decline in motor skills due to demyelination and subsequent nerve damage. A hearing deficit may develop, eyesight and response to visual and physical stimuli begins to diminish and eventually becomes non-existent. The life expectancy of an individual with ACOX1 deficiency is 5 years.

== Genetics ==
Acyl-CoA oxidase deficiency is an autosomal recessive disorder that is caused by biallelic pathogenic variants in ACOX1. This is the gene that codes for the production of an enzyme called peroxisomal straight-chain acyl-CoA oxidase which is responsible for the breakdown of VLCFAs. It is not completely clear how the build-up of these VLCFAs causes the symptoms seen with this condition, however research suggests that this abnormal accumulation triggers an inflammation in the nervous system which leads to demyelination. Demyelination leads to the loss of white matter, leukodystrophy, in the brain and spinal cord. It is this leukodystrophy that is related to the development of neurological abnormalities in people with Acyl-CoA oxidase deficiency. Acyl-CoA oxidase deficiency is an extremely rare condition.

== Diagnosis ==
Diagnosis can be done both prenatally based on family history and after birth based on clinical suspicion. The primary prenatal diagnosis techniques involve the assessment of amniotic fluid for an abnormal elevation in VLCFAs, and a reduced presence (or in some cases complete absence) of acyl-CoA oxidase in fibroblasts. If the causative variants in a family are known, prenatal diagnosis can be performed by molecular testing. After birth, there are a number of diagnostic techniques available for use. A blood sample can be taken, from which the serum levels of VLCFAs and acyl-CoA oxidase activity can be assessed. Analysis of VLCFAs is important for the identification of ACOX1 deficiency, if a leukodystrophy has been identified Since the condition is genetic, and is caused by pathogenic variants in ACOX1, it can be confirmed by sequence or copy number analysis. Due to the rarity of this condition, people who have it may not be diagnosed early in their disease progression. As a result, acyl-CoA oxidase deficiency may be misdiagnosed as similar conditions such as Usher syndrome and neonatal adrenoleukodystrophy.

== Treatment ==
There are no cures for ACOX1 deficiency, supportive care is used to manage specific clinical symptoms for affected individuals. Treatment is based upon symptoms, with the aim to provide relief. Pharmacologic agents are used to help improve muscle tone (management of dystonia) and to block neurological signalling to the muscle. Physical therapy is used to improve movement and function. For the specific treatment of recurrent seizures, there are both pharmaceutical and surgical options.
