= HSD17B13 =

Protein-coding gene in the species Homo sapiens

Identifiers
- Aliases: HSD17B13, NIIL497, SCDR9, SDR16C3, HMFN0376, hydroxysteroid (17-beta) dehydrogenase 13, hydroxysteroid 17-beta dehydrogenase 13
- External IDs: OMIM: 612127; MGI: 2140804; GeneCards: HSD17B13
Enzyme activity
EC #	BRENDA	ExPASy	KEGG	MetaCyc
1.1.1.62	↗	↗	↗	↗
1.1.1.105	↗	↗	↗	↗

Gene location (Human)
Chr.	Chromosome 4 (human)
Band	4q22.1	Start	87,303,789 bp
Band	4q22.1	End	87,322,886 bp

Gene location (Mouse)
Chr.	Chromosome 5 (mouse)
Band	5|5 E5	Start	104,103,306 bp
Band	5|5 E5	End	104,125,276 bp
RNA expression pattern
Bgee	Human / Mouse (ortholog); Top expressed in: liver; right lobe of liver; olfactory zone of nasal mucosa; vagina; subcutaneous adipose tissue; lactiferous gland; myometrium; ectocervix; skin of leg; body of uterus / Top expressed in: left lobe of liver; epithelium of small intestine; duodenum; zygote; secondary oocyte; ileum; migratory enteric neural crest cell; primary oocyte; islet of Langerhans; jejunum; More reference expression data
BioGPS	n/a
Gene ontology
Molecular function	oxidoreductase activity; molecular function; steroid dehydrogenase activity
Cellular component	extracellular region; lipid droplet; cytosol; cellular component
Biological process	positive regulation of lipid biosynthetic process; lipid droplet organization; biological process
Sources:Amigo / QuickGO
Orthologs
Databases	NCBI: entry; OMA: entry
Species	Human	Mouse
Entrez	345275	243168
Ensembl	ENSG00000170509	ENSMUSG00000034528
UniProt	Q7Z5P4	Q8VCR2
RefSeq (mRNA)	NM_178135; NM_001136230	NM_001163486; NM_198030
RefSeq (protein)	NP_001129702; NP_835236	NP_001156958; NP_932147
Location (UCSC)	Chr 4: 87.3 – 87.32 Mb	Chr 5: 104.1 – 104.13 Mb
PubMed search
- Wikidata
View/Edit Human	View/Edit Mouse

17β-Hydroxysteroid dehydrogenase type 13 also known as 17β-HSD type 13 is an enzyme that in humans is encoded by the HSD17B13 gene.

17β-HSD13 is significantly up-regulated in the liver of patients with metabolic dysfunction–associated steatotic liver disease (MASLD) and enhances lipogenesis.

== Inhibitors ==
In 2023 the first potent and selective HSD17B13 inhibitor, BI-3231, was reported. The inhibitor meets the quality criteria of a 'Donated Chemical Probe' as defined by the Structural Genomics Consortium.
