= HSD17B11 =

Protein-coding gene in the species Homo sapiens

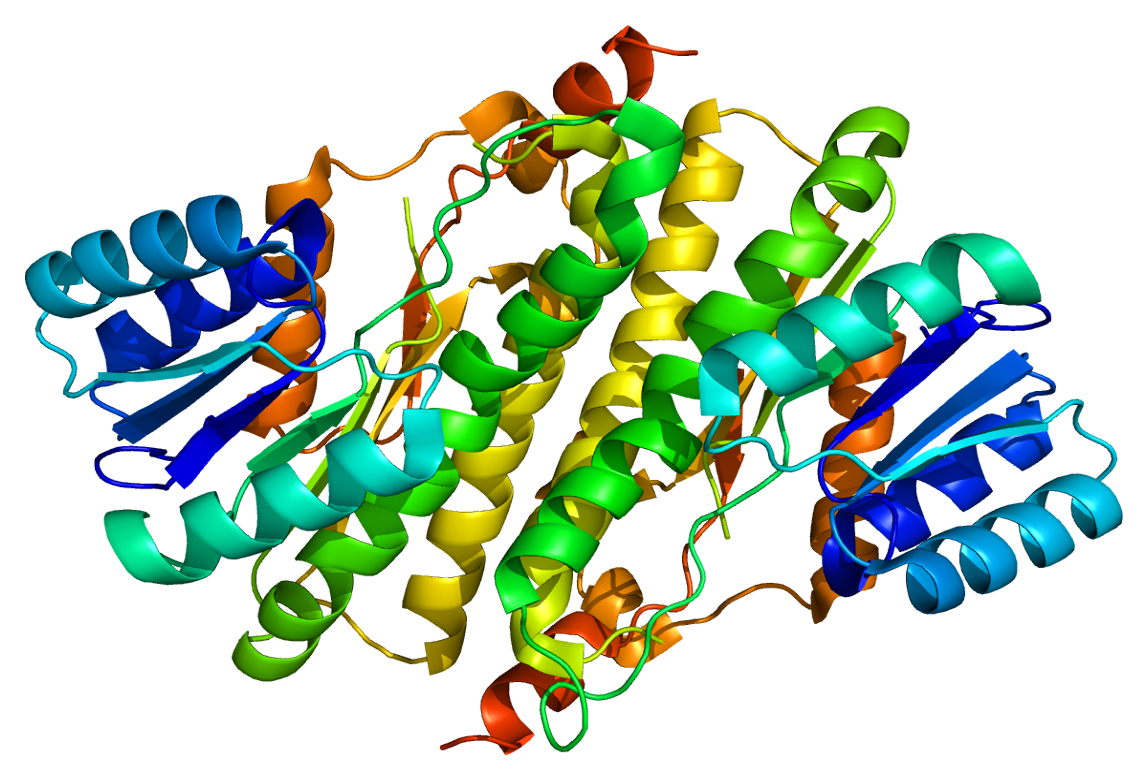

Identifiers
- Aliases: HSD17B11, 17-BETA-HSD11, 17-BETA-HSDXI, 17BHSD11, DHRS8, PAN1B, RETSDR2, SDR16C2, hydroxysteroid (17-beta) dehydrogenase 11, hydroxysteroid 17-beta dehydrogenase 11
- External IDs: OMIM: 612831; MGI: 2149821; GeneCards: HSD17B11
Available structures
PDB	Ortholog search: PDBe RCSB
PDB	List of PDB id codes 1YB1
Enzyme activity
EC #	BRENDA	ExPASy	KEGG	MetaCyc
1.1.1.62	↗	↗	↗	↗

Gene location (Human)
Chr.	Chromosome 4 (human)
Band	4q22.1	Start	87,336,515 bp
Band	4q22.1	End	87,391,188 bp

Gene location (Mouse)
Chr.	Chromosome 5 (mouse)
Band	5|5 E5	Start	104,137,628 bp
Band	5|5 E5	End	104,169,785 bp
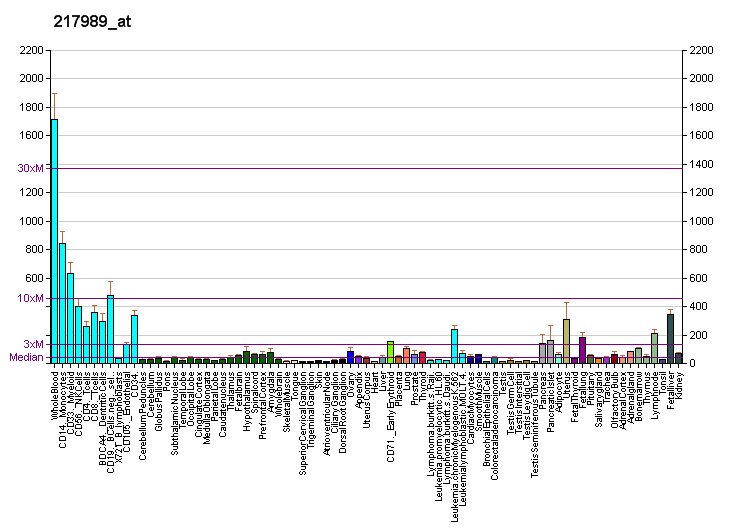
RNA expression pattern
Bgee	Human / Mouse (ortholog); Top expressed in: jejunal mucosa; mucosa of colon; duodenum; mucosa of sigmoid colon; rectum; mucosa of ileum; monocyte; gallbladder; mucosa of transverse colon; blood / Top expressed in: vestibular membrane of cochlear duct; pyloric antrum; epithelium of stomach; mucous cell of stomach; iris; intestinal villus; stria vascularis; Ileal epithelium; left lobe of liver; duodenum; More reference expression data
BioGPS	More reference expression data
Gene ontology
Molecular function	oxidoreductase activity; steroid dehydrogenase activity; estradiol 17-beta-dehydrogenase activity
Cellular component	cytoplasm; extracellular region; cytosol; lipid droplet
Biological process	estrogen biosynthetic process; androgen catabolic process; lipid metabolism; steroid biosynthetic process
Sources:Amigo / QuickGO
Orthologs
Databases	NCBI: entry; OMA: entry
Species	Human	Mouse
Entrez	51170	114664
Ensembl	ENSG00000198189	ENSMUSG00000029311
UniProt	Q8NBQ5	Q9EQ06
RefSeq (mRNA)	NM_016245	NM_053262
RefSeq (protein)	NP_057329	NP_444492
Location (UCSC)	Chr 4: 87.34 – 87.39 Mb	Chr 5: 104.14 – 104.17 Mb
PubMed search
- Wikidata
View/Edit Human	View/Edit Mouse

Estradiol 17-beta-dehydrogenase 11 is an enzyme that in humans is encoded by the HSD17B11 gene.

HSD17B11 expression has been linked to higher survival rates for lung cancer patients.
