= HSD17B7 =

Protein-coding gene in humans

Identifiers
- Aliases: HSD17B7, PRAP, SDR37C1, hydroxysteroid (17-beta) dehydrogenase 7, hydroxysteroid 17-beta dehydrogenase 7
- External IDs: OMIM: 606756; MGI: 1330808; GeneCards: HSD17B7
Enzyme activity
EC #	BRENDA	ExPASy	KEGG	MetaCyc
1.1.1.62	↗	↗	↗	↗
1.1.1.210	↗	↗	↗	↗
1.1.1.270	↗	↗	↗	↗

Gene location (Human)
Chr.	Chromosome 1 (human)
Band	1q23.3	Start	162,790,702 bp
Band	1q23.3	End	162,812,823 bp

Gene location (Mouse)
Chr.	Chromosome 1 (mouse)
Band	1|1 H3	Start	169,777,104 bp
Band	1|1 H3	End	169,796,810 bp
RNA expression pattern
Bgee	Human / Mouse (ortholog); Top expressed in: right lobe of liver; right adrenal gland; right adrenal cortex; left adrenal gland; left adrenal cortex; anterior pituitary; C1 segment; upper lobe of left lung; islet of Langerhans; ectocervix / Top expressed in: vestibular sensory epithelium; skin of external ear; Paneth cell; ciliary body; facial motor nucleus; condyle; hair follicle; substantia nigra; iris; medullary collecting duct; More reference expression data
BioGPS	n/a
Gene ontology
Molecular function	oxidoreductase activity; estradiol 17-beta-dehydrogenase activity; 3-keto sterol reductase activity
Cellular component	integral component of membrane; plasma membrane; endoplasmic reticulum membrane; endoplasmic reticulum; membrane
Biological process	estrogen biosynthetic process; cholesterol biosynthetic process; lipid metabolism; steroid biosynthetic process; nervous system development; cell differentiation; embryonic skeletal system development
Sources:Amigo / QuickGO
Orthologs
Databases	NCBI: entry; OMA: entry
Species	Human	Mouse
Entrez	51478	15490
Ensembl	ENSG00000132196	ENSMUSG00000026675
UniProt	P56937	O88736
RefSeq (mRNA)	NM_001304512; NM_001304513; NM_016371	NM_010476
RefSeq (protein)	NP_001291441; NP_001291442; NP_057455	NP_034606
Location (UCSC)	Chr 1: 162.79 – 162.81 Mb	Chr 1: 169.78 – 169.8 Mb
PubMed search
- Wikidata
View/Edit Human	View/Edit Mouse

3-keto-steroid reductase is an enzyme that in humans is encoded by the HSD17B7 gene.

The 17-beta-hydroxysteroid dehydrogenase enzyme (EC 1.1.1.62) oxidizes or reduces estrogens and androgens in mammals and regulates the biologic potency of these steroids.[supplied by OMIM]
