= Acyl-CoA oxidase 3 =

Enzyme found in humans

ACOX3

Identifiers
- Aliases: ACOX3, acyl-CoA oxidase 3, pristanoyl
- External IDs: OMIM: 603402; MGI: 1933156; GeneCards: ACOX3
Enzyme activity
EC #	BRENDA	ExPASy	KEGG	MetaCyc
1.3.3.6	↗	↗	↗	↗

Gene location (Human)
Chr.	Chromosome 4 (human)
Band	4p16.1	Start	8,366,282 bp
Band	4p16.1	End	8,440,723 bp

Gene location (Mouse)
Chr.	Chromosome 5 (mouse)
Band	5|5 B3	Start	35,740,384 bp
Band	5|5 B3	End	35,772,696 bp
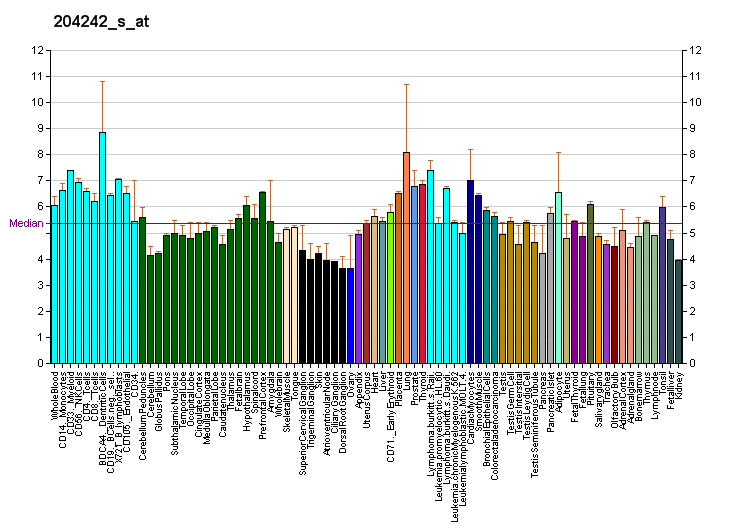

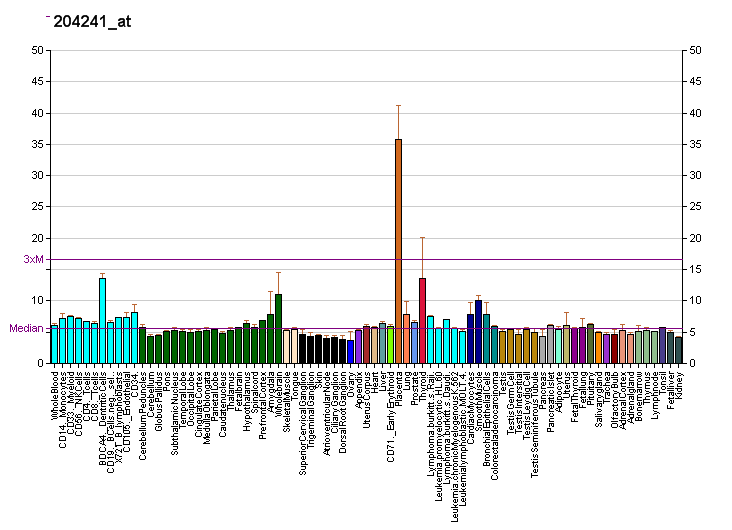
RNA expression pattern
Bgee	Human / Mouse (ortholog); Top expressed in: pancreatic ductal cell; gingival epithelium; right auricle of heart; apex of heart; right lobe of liver; olfactory zone of nasal mucosa; skin of leg; skin of abdomen; minor salivary glands; sural nerve / Top expressed in: right kidney; granulocyte; spermatocyte; zygote; secondary oocyte; proximal tubule; spermatid; lip; muscle of thigh; primary visual cortex; More reference expression data
BioGPS	More reference expression data
Gene ontology
Molecular function	oxidoreductase activity, acting on the CH-CH group of donors; acyl-CoA oxidase activity; oxidoreductase activity; signaling receptor binding; pristanoyl-CoA oxidase activity; FAD binding; acyl-CoA dehydrogenase activity; flavin adenine dinucleotide binding; fatty acid binding
Cellular component	membrane; peroxisome; peroxisomal matrix; mitochondrion; cytosol
Biological process	lipid metabolism; fatty acid metabolic process; fatty acid beta-oxidation using acyl-CoA oxidase; fatty acid beta-oxidation; metabolism; fatty acid beta-oxidation using acyl-CoA dehydrogenase; protein targeting to peroxisome; lipid homeostasis
Sources:Amigo / QuickGO
Orthologs
Databases	NCBI: entry; OMA: entry
Species	Human	Mouse
Entrez	8310	80911
Ensembl	ENSG00000087008	ENSMUSG00000029098
UniProt	O15254	Q9EPL9
RefSeq (mRNA)	NM_001101667; NM_003501	NM_030721; NM_001357018; NM_001357019; NM_001357020
RefSeq (protein)	NP_001095137; NP_003492; NP_001362712; NP_001362713; NP_001362714 NP_001362715; NP_001362716; NP_001362717; NP_001362718; NP_001362719	NP_109646; NP_001343947; NP_001343948; NP_001343949
Location (UCSC)	Chr 4: 8.37 – 8.44 Mb	Chr 5: 35.74 – 35.77 Mb
PubMed search
- Wikidata
View/Edit Human	View/Edit Mouse

Acyl-CoA oxidase 3 is an enzyme that in humans is encoded by the ACOX3 gene. This enzyme is also known as pristanoyl-CoA oxidase, and is involved in the desaturation of 2-methyl branched fatty acids in peroxisomes.

Unlike the rat homolog, the human gene is expressed in very low amounts in the liver such that its mRNA was undetectable by routine Northern-blot analysis, by immunoblotting for its product, or by enzyme activity measurements. However the human cDNA encoding a 700 amino acid protein with a peroxisomal targeting C-terminal tripeptide S-K-L was isolated and is thought to be expressed under special conditions such as specific developmental stages or in a tissue specific manner in tissues that have not yet been examined.

== See also ==
- Acyl-CoA oxidase 1
- Acyl-CoA oxidase 2
- Acyl-CoA oxidase
