= HSD17B12 =

Protein-coding gene in the species Homo sapiens

Identifiers
- Aliases: HSD17B12, KAR, SDR12C1, hydroxysteroid (17-beta) dehydrogenase 12, hydroxysteroid 17-beta dehydrogenase 12
- External IDs: OMIM: 609574; MGI: 1926967; GeneCards: HSD17B12
Enzyme activity
EC #	BRENDA	ExPASy	KEGG	MetaCyc
1.1.1.62	↗	↗	↗	↗
1.1.1.330	↗	↗	↗	↗

Gene location (Human)
Chr.	Chromosome 11 (human)
Band	11p11.2	Start	43,680,680 bp
Band	11p11.2	End	43,856,617 bp

Gene location (Mouse)
Chr.	Chromosome 2 (mouse)
Band	2|2 E1	Start	93,863,034 bp
Band	2|2 E1	End	93,988,309 bp
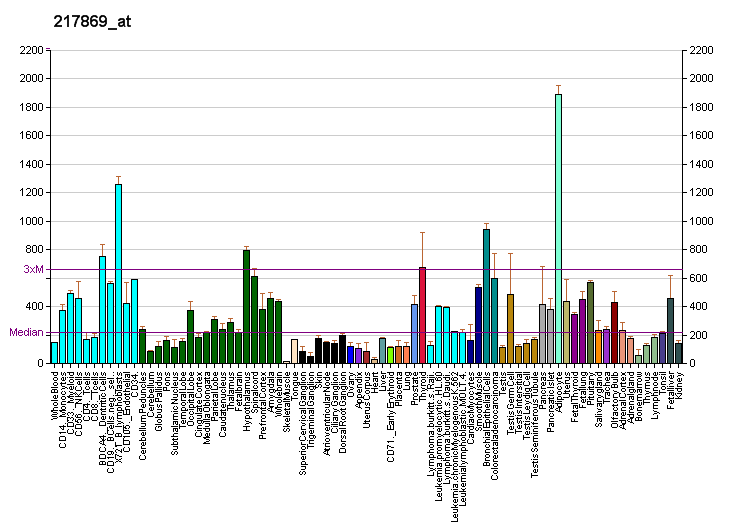
RNA expression pattern
Bgee	Human / Mouse (ortholog); Top expressed in: endothelial cell; retinal pigment epithelium; pancreatic ductal cell; optic nerve; pars reticulata; inferior ganglion of vagus nerve; cardia; renal medulla; spinal ganglia; pars compacta / Top expressed in: skin of external ear; brown adipose tissue; transitional epithelium of urinary bladder; cumulus cell; tunica adventitia of aorta; left lobe of liver; ciliary body; iris; sciatic nerve; lip; More reference expression data
BioGPS	More reference expression data
Gene ontology
Molecular function	heparin binding; estradiol 17-beta-dehydrogenase activity; oxidoreductase activity; collagen binding; fibronectin binding; protein binding; 3-oxo-lignoceroyl-CoA reductase activity; 3-oxo-behenoyl-CoA reductase activity; long-chain-3-hydroxyacyl-CoA dehydrogenase activity; 3-oxo-arachidoyl-CoA reductase activity; 3-oxo-cerotoyl-CoA reductase activity
Cellular component	integral component of membrane; membrane; endoplasmic reticulum; endoplasmic reticulum membrane; extracellular matrix
Biological process	lipid metabolism; extracellular matrix organization; long-chain fatty-acyl-CoA biosynthetic process; positive regulation of cell-substrate adhesion; fatty acid biosynthetic process; estrogen biosynthetic process; steroid biosynthetic process
Sources:Amigo / QuickGO
Orthologs
Databases	NCBI: entry; OMA: entry
Species	Human	Mouse
Entrez	51144	56348
Ensembl	ENSG00000149084	ENSMUSG00000027195
UniProt	Q53GQ0	O70503
RefSeq (mRNA)	NM_016142	NM_019657
RefSeq (protein)	NP_057226	NP_062631
Location (UCSC)	Chr 11: 43.68 – 43.86 Mb	Chr 2: 93.86 – 93.99 Mb
PubMed search
- Wikidata
View/Edit Human	View/Edit Mouse

Estradiol 17-beta-dehydrogenase 12 is an enzyme that in humans is encoded by the HSD17B12 gene.

The enzyme 17-beta hydroxysteroid dehydrogenase-12 (HSD17B12) uses NADPH to reduce 3-ketoacyl-CoA to 3-hydroxyacyl-CoA during the second step of fatty acid elongation.[supplied by OMIM]
