= Alcohol oxidoreductase =

Class of enzymes

Functional group of an alcohol molecule. The carbon atom is attached to other carbon or hydrogen atoms.

Alcohol oxidoreductases are oxidoreductase enzymes that act upon an alcohol functional group.

They are classified under "1.1" in the EC number numbering system.
