= HSD17B10 =

Protein-coding gene in the species Homo sapiens

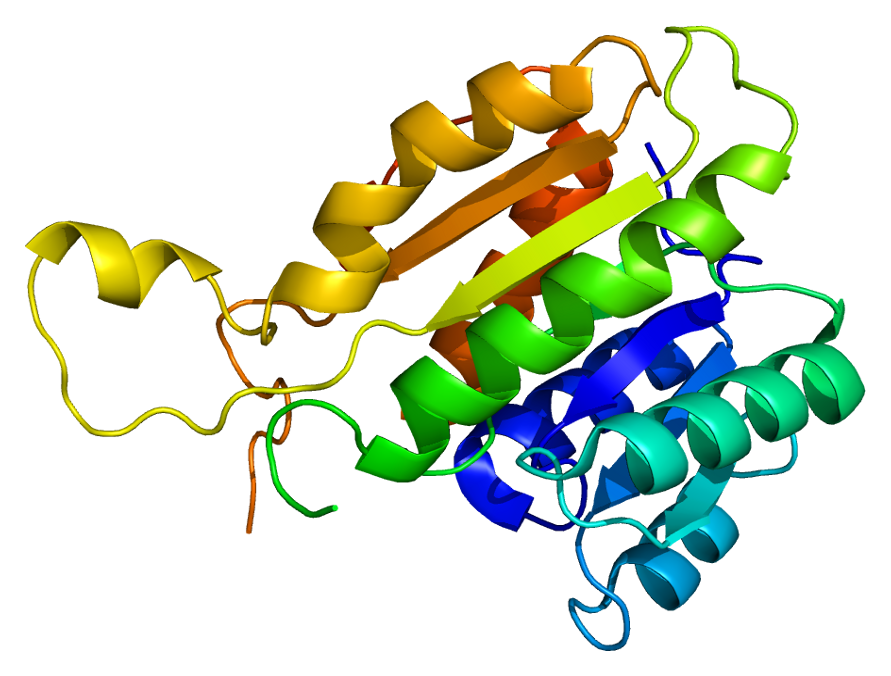

Identifiers
- Aliases: HSD17B10, 17b-HSD10, ABAD, CAMR, DUPXp11.22, ERAB, HADH2, HCD2, MHBD, MRPP2, MRX17, MRX31, MRXS10, SCHAD, SDR5C1, hydroxysteroid (17-beta) dehydrogenase 10, hydroxysteroid 17-beta dehydrogenase 10, HSD10MD
- External IDs: OMIM: 300256; MGI: 1333871; GeneCards: HSD17B10
Available structures
PDB	Ortholog search: PDBe RCSB
PDB	List of PDB id codes 1SO8, 1U7T, 2O23
Enzyme activity
EC #	BRENDA	ExPASy	KEGG	MetaCyc
1.1.1.35	↗	↗	↗	↗
1.1.1.51	↗	↗	↗	↗
1.1.1.53	↗	↗	↗	↗
1.1.1.62	↗	↗	↗	↗
1.1.1.159	↗	↗	↗	↗
1.1.1.178	↗	↗	↗	↗
1.1.1.239	↗	↗	↗	↗

Gene location (Human)
Chr.	X chromosome (human)
Band	Xp11.22	Start	53,431,258 bp
Band	Xp11.22	End	53,434,370 bp

Gene location (Mouse)
Chr.	X chromosome (mouse)
Band	X|X F3	Start	150,784,841 bp
Band	X|X F3	End	150,787,438 bp
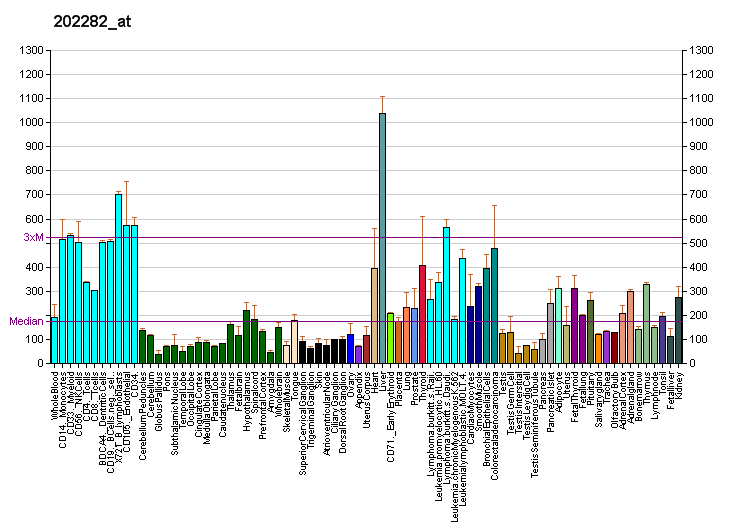
RNA expression pattern
Bgee	Human / Mouse (ortholog); Top expressed in: right lobe of liver; right adrenal gland; right adrenal cortex; left adrenal gland; left adrenal cortex; apex of heart; human kidney; mucosa of esophagus; right auricle of heart; left ventricle / Top expressed in: left lobe of liver; epithelium of lens; cumulus cell; vestibular sensory epithelium; right kidney; right ventricle; epithelium of stomach; medullary collecting duct; brown adipose tissue; internal carotid artery; More reference expression data
BioGPS	More reference expression data
Gene ontology
Molecular function	testosterone dehydrogenase [NAD(P) activity]; 3-hydroxy-2-methylbutyryl-CoA dehydrogenase activity; protein binding; oxidoreductase activity; cholate 7-alpha-dehydrogenase activity; RNA binding; 3-hydroxyacyl-CoA dehydrogenase activity; tRNA binding; dihydrotestosterone 17-beta-dehydrogenase activity
Cellular component	cytoplasm; plasma membrane; mitochondrial matrix; mitochondrion; mitochondrial ribonuclease P complex
Biological process	lipid metabolism; branched-chain amino acid catabolic process; mitochondrial tRNA processing; mitochondrial tRNA methylation; tRNA processing; mitochondrion organization; protein homotetramerization; mitochondrial tRNA 5'-end processing; mitochondrial tRNA 3'-end processing
Sources:Amigo / QuickGO
Orthologs
Databases	NCBI: entry; OMA: entry
Species	Human	Mouse
Entrez	3028	15108
Ensembl	ENSG00000072506	ENSMUSG00000025260
UniProt	Q99714	O08756
RefSeq (mRNA)	NM_004493; NM_001037811	NM_016763
RefSeq (protein)	NP_001032900; NP_004484	n/a
Location (UCSC)	Chr X: 53.43 – 53.43 Mb	Chr X: 150.78 – 150.79 Mb
PubMed search
- Wikidata
View/Edit Human	View/Edit Mouse

17-β-Hydroxysteroid dehydrogenase X (HSD10) also known as 3-hydroxyacyl-CoA dehydrogenase type-2 is a mitochondrial enzyme that in humans is encoded by the HSD17B10 (hydroxysteroid (17β) dehydrogenase 10) gene. Several alternatively spliced transcript variants have been identified, but the full-length nature of only two transcript variants has been determined. Human HSD10 cDNA was cloned from the brain (NM_004493), and the resulting protein, a homotetramer, was first characterized as a short chain 3-hydroxyacyl-CoA dehydrogenase (SCHAD). Active sites of this enzyme can accommodate different substrates; 17β-HSD10 is involved in the oxidation of isoleucine, branched-chain fatty acids, and xenobiotics as well as the metabolism of sex hormones and neuroactive steroids.

== Function ==
17beta-hydroxysteroid dehydrogenase 10 is a member of the short-chain dehydrogenase/reductase superfamily. This homotetrameric mitochondrial multifunctional enzyme catalyzes the oxidation of neuroactive steroids and the degradation of isoleucine. This enzyme is capable of binding to other peptides, such as estrogen receptor α, amyloid-β, and tRNA methyltransferase 10C. Missense mutations of the HSD17B10 gene result in 17β-HSD10 deficiency, an infantile neurodegeneration characterized by progressive psychomotor regression and alteration of mitochondria morphology. 17β-HSD10 exhibits only a negligible alcohol dehydrogenase activity, and is not localized in the endoplasmic reticulum or plasma membrane. Its alternate name – Aβ binding alcohol dehydrogenase (ABAD) – is a misnomer predicated on the mistaken belief that this enzyme is alcohol dehydrogenase.

== Structure ==
=== Gene ===
The Human HSD17B10 gene has 6 exons residing on the X chromosome at p11.22.

=== Protein ===
The gene product is a mitochondrial protein that catalyzes the oxidation of a wide variety of fatty acids and steroids, and is a subunit of mitochondrial ribonuclease P, which is involved in tRNA maturation. The molecular weight of 17β-HSD10 that is composed of four identical subunits is 108 kDa; each subunit consists of 261 amino acid residues. Although the endoplasmic reticulum (ER)-associated amyloid-β peptide binding protein (ERAB) was reported to be associated with the ER and to consist of 262 residues with a molecular weight of 27 kDa, ERAB is actually identical to 17β-HSD10 that is localized in mitochondria but not ER.

== Clinical significance ==
Abnormal expression, as well as mutations of the HSD17B10 gene leads to impairment of the structure, function, and dynamics of mitochondria. This may underlie the pathogenesis of the synaptic and neuronal deficiency exhibited in 17β-HSD10 related diseases, including 17β-HSD10 deficiency and Alzheimer's disease (AD). Missense and silent mutations in the gene are the cause of hydroxysteroid (17β) dehydrogenase X (HSD10) deficiency, formerly MHBD deficiency, and X-linked intellectual disability, choreoathetosis, and abnormal behavior (MRXS10), respectively. Restoration of steroid homeostasis could be achieved by the supplementation of neuroactive steroids with a proper dosing and treatment regimen or by the adjustment of 17β-HSD10 activity to protect neurons. The discovery of this enzyme's true function has opened a new therapeutic avenue for treating AD.

== Interactions ==
HSD17B10 has been shown to interact with Amyloid precursor protein.
