= Acyl-CoA oxidase 1 =

Enzyme found in humans

ACOX1

Identifiers
- Aliases: ACOX1, ACOX, PALMCOX, SCOX, acyl-CoA oxidase 1, palmitoyl, acyl-CoA oxidase 1, MITCH
- External IDs: OMIM: 609751; MGI: 1330812; GeneCards: ACOX1
Enzyme activity
EC #	BRENDA	ExPASy	KEGG	MetaCyc
1.3.3.6	↗	↗	↗	↗

Gene location (Human)
Chr.	Chromosome 17 (human)
Band	17q25.1	Start	75,941,507 bp
Band	17q25.1	End	75,979,177 bp

Gene location (Mouse)
Chr.	Chromosome 11 (mouse)
Band	11|11 E2	Start	116,062,714 bp
Band	11|11 E2	End	116,089,871 bp
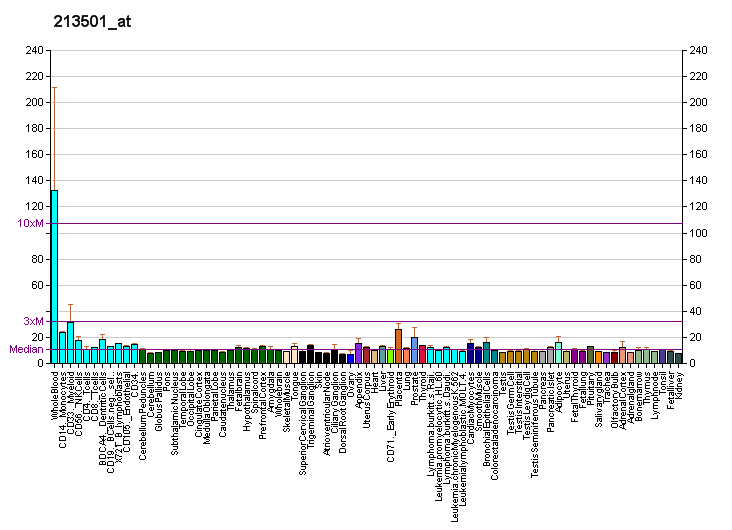

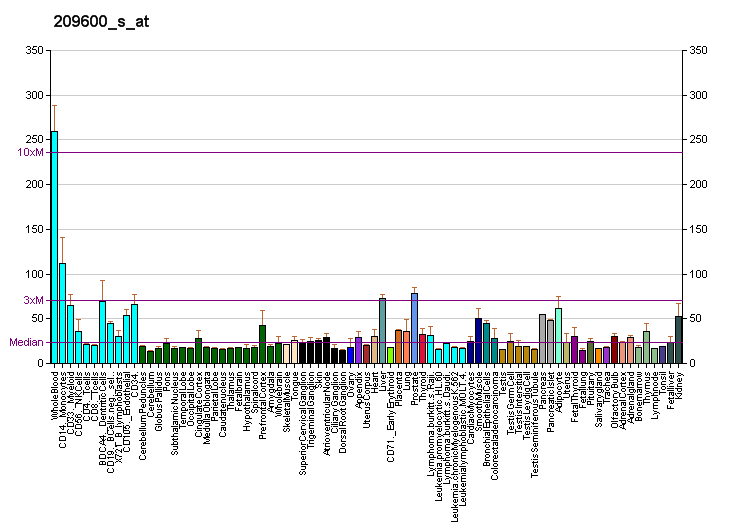
RNA expression pattern
Bgee	Human / Mouse (ortholog); Top expressed in: jejunal mucosa; buccal mucosa cell; duodenum; mucosa of transverse colon; liver; right lobe of liver; internal globus pallidus; oral cavity; mucosa of ileum; rectum / Top expressed in: left lobe of liver; right kidney; proximal tubule; human kidney; tunica adventitia of aorta; brown adipose tissue; pyloric antrum; epithelium of stomach; jejunum; white adipose tissue; More reference expression data
BioGPS	More reference expression data
Gene ontology
Molecular function	signaling receptor binding; PDZ domain binding; palmitoyl-CoA oxidase activity; protein N-terminus binding; oxidoreductase activity; oxidoreductase activity, acting on the CH-CH group of donors; acyl-CoA oxidase activity; FAD binding; acyl-CoA dehydrogenase activity; flavin adenine dinucleotide binding; fatty acid binding
Cellular component	nucleolus; nucleoplasm; cytoplasm; mitochondrion; nucleus; peroxisomal membrane; intracellular membrane-bounded organelle; peroxisome; membrane; peroxisomal matrix; plasma membrane; cytosol
Biological process	spermatogenesis; generation of precursor metabolites and energy; lipid metabolism; fatty acid beta-oxidation; alpha-linolenic acid metabolic process; metabolism; peroxisome fission; fatty acid metabolic process; very long-chain fatty acid metabolic process; prostaglandin metabolic process; lipid homeostasis; fatty acid oxidation; fatty acid beta-oxidation using acyl-CoA oxidase; regulation of lipid metabolic process; fatty acid beta-oxidation using acyl-CoA dehydrogenase; protein targeting to peroxisome
Sources:Amigo / QuickGO
Orthologs
Databases	NCBI: entry; OMA: entry
Species	Human	Mouse
Entrez	51	11430
Ensembl	ENSG00000161533	ENSMUSG00000020777
UniProt	Q15067	Q9R0H0
RefSeq (mRNA)	NM_001185039; NM_004035; NM_007292	NM_001271898; NM_015729; NM_001377521; NM_001377522
RefSeq (protein)	NP_001171968; NP_004026; NP_009223	NP_001258827; NP_056544; NP_001364450; NP_001364451
Location (UCSC)	Chr 17: 75.94 – 75.98 Mb	Chr 11: 116.06 – 116.09 Mb
PubMed search
- Wikidata
View/Edit Human	View/Edit Mouse

Acyl-CoA oxidase 1 (ACOX1) is an enzyme that in humans is encoded by the ACOX1 gene. This form of acyl-CoA oxidase is involved in breaking down straight chain very-long-chain fatty acids (VLCFAs) as part of peroxisomal beta-oxidation. It can act on both saturated and unsaturated VLCFAs.

The protein encoded by this gene is the first enzyme of the fatty acid beta-oxidation pathway, which catalyzes the desaturation of acyl-CoAs to 2-trans-enoyl-CoAs. It donates electrons directly to molecular oxygen, thereby producing hydrogen peroxide. Defects in this gene result in pseudoneonatal adrenoleukodystrophy, a disease that is characterized by accumulation of very long chain fatty acids. Alternatively spliced transcript variants encoding different isoforms have been identified.

Clinical features of ACOX1 deficiency generally include hypotonia and neonatal seizures.

== See also ==
- Acyl-CoA oxidase 2
- Acyl-CoA oxidase 3
- Acyl-CoA oxidase deficiency
