= Oxidoreductase =

Enzyme involved in redox reactions

In biochemistry, an oxidoreductase is an enzyme that catalyzes the transfer of electrons from one molecule, the reductant, also called the electron donor, to another, the oxidant, also called the electron acceptor. This group of enzymes usually utilizes NADP+ or NAD+ as cofactors. Transmembrane oxidoreductases create electron transport chains in bacteria, chloroplasts and mitochondria, including respiratory complexes I, II, and III. Some others can associate with biological membranes as peripheral membrane proteins or be anchored to the membranes through a single transmembrane helix.

== Reactions ==
For example, an enzyme that catalyzed this reaction would be an oxidoreductase:

A^{–} + B → A + B^{–}

In this example, A is the reductant (electron donor) and B is the oxidant (electron acceptor).

In biochemical reactions, the redox reactions are sometimes more difficult to see, such as this reaction from glycolysis:

P_{i} + glyceraldehyde-3-phosphate + NAD^{+} → NADH + H^{+} + 1,3-bisphosphoglycerate

In this reaction, NAD^{+} is the oxidant (electron acceptor), and glyceraldehyde-3-phosphate is the reductant (electron donor).

== Nomenclature ==
Proper names of oxidoreductases are formed as "donor:acceptor oxidoreductase"; however, other names are much more common.

- The common name is "donor dehydrogenase" when possible, such as glyceraldehyde-3-phosphate dehydrogenase for the second reaction above.
- Common names are also sometimes formed as "acceptor reductase", such as NAD^{+} reductase.
- "Donor oxidase" is a special case where O_{2} is the acceptor.

== Classification ==
Oxidoreductases are classified as EC 1 in the EC number classification of enzymes. Oxidoreductases can be further classified into 21 subclasses:

- EC 1.1 includes oxidoreductases that act on the CH-OH group of donors (alcohol oxidoreductases such as methanol dehydrogenase)
- EC 1.2 includes oxidoreductases that act on the aldehyde or oxo group of donors
- EC 1.3 includes oxidoreductases that act on the CH-CH group of donors (CH-CH oxidoreductases)
- EC 1.4 includes oxidoreductases that act on the CH-NH_{2} group of donors (Amino acid oxidoreductases, Monoamine oxidase)
- EC 1.5 includes oxidoreductases that act on CH-NH group of donors
- EC 1.6 includes oxidoreductases that act on NADH or NADPH
- EC 1.7 includes oxidoreductases that act on other nitrogenous compounds as donors
- EC 1.8 includes oxidoreductases that act on a sulfur group of donors
- EC 1.9 includes oxidoreductases that act on a heme group of donors
- EC 1.10 includes oxidoreductases that act on diphenols and related substances as donors
- EC 1.11 includes oxidoreductases that act on peroxide as an acceptor (peroxidases)
- EC 1.12 includes oxidoreductases that act on hydrogen as donors
- EC 1.13 includes oxidoreductases that act on single donors with incorporation of molecular oxygen (oxygenases)
- EC 1.14 includes oxidoreductases that act on paired donors with incorporation of molecular oxygen
- EC 1.15 includes oxidoreductases that act on superoxide radicals as acceptors
- EC 1.16 includes oxidoreductases that oxidize metal ions
- EC 1.17 includes oxidoreductases that act on CH or CH_{2} groups
- EC 1.18 includes oxidoreductases that act on iron-sulfur proteins as donors
- EC 1.19 includes oxidoreductases that act on reduced flavodoxin as a donor
- EC 1.20 includes oxidoreductases that act on phosphorus or arsenic in donors
- EC 1.21 includes oxidoreductases that act on X-H and Y-H to form an X-Y bond

== See also ==
- Hydroxylase
- List of enzymes
