= Short-chain dehydrogenase =

short chain dehydrogenase
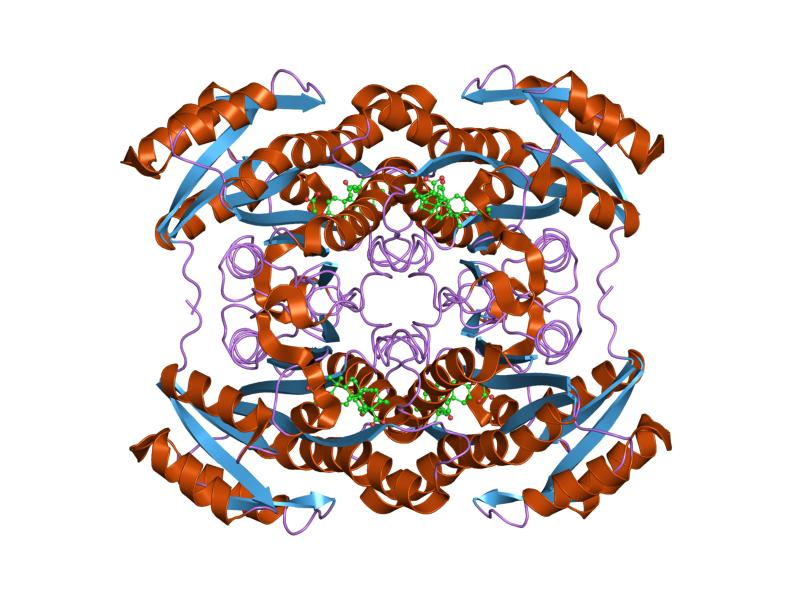

Identifiers
- Symbol: adh_short
- Pfam: PF00106
- InterPro: IPR002198
- PROSITE: PDOC00060
- SCOP2: 1hdc / SCOPe / SUPFAM
- OPM superfamily: 119
- OPM protein: 1xu7
- CDD: cd02266
- Membranome: 246
Available protein structures:
- PDB: IPR002198 PF00106 (ECOD; PDBsum)
- AlphaFold: IPR002198; PF00106

The short-chain dehydrogenases/reductases family (SDR) is a very large family of enzymes, most of which are known to be NAD- or NADP-dependent oxidoreductases. As the first member of this family to be characterised was Drosophila alcohol dehydrogenase, this family used to be called 'insect-type', or 'short-chain' alcohol dehydrogenases. Most members of this family are proteins of about 250 to 300 amino acid residues. Most dehydrogenases possess at least 2 domains, the first binding the coenzyme, often NAD, and the second binding the substrate. This latter domain determines the substrate specificity and contains amino acids involved in catalysis. Little sequence similarity has been found in the coenzyme binding domain although there is a large degree of structural similarity, and it has therefore been suggested that the structure of dehydrogenases has arisen through gene fusion of a common ancestral coenzyme nucleotide sequence with various substrate specific domains.

== Subfamilies ==
- Glucose/ribitol dehydrogenase InterPro: IPR002347
- Insect alcohol dehydrogenase family InterPro: IPR002424
- 2,3-dihydro-2,3-dihydroxybenzoate dehydrogenase InterPro: IPR003560

== Human proteins containing this domain ==
BDH1; BDH2; CBR1; CBR3; CBR4; DCXR; DECR1; DECR2; DHRS1; DHRS10; DHRS13; DHRS2; DHRS3; DHRS4; DHRS4L2; DHRS7; DHRS7B; DHRS8; DHRS9; DHRSX; FASN; FVT1; HADH2; HPGD; HSD11B1; HSD11B2; HSD17B1; HSD17B10; HSD17B12; HSD17B13; HSD17B2; HSD17B3; HSD17B4; HSD17B6; HSD17B7; HSD17B7P2; HSD17B8; HSDL1; HSDL2; PECR; QDPR; RDH10; RDH11; RDH12; RDH13; RDH14; RDH16; RDH5; RDH8; RDHE2; RDHS; SCDR10; SPR; WWOX;
