= NADP-retinol dehydrogenase =

Identifiers
- EC no.: 1.1.1.300

Databases
- IntEnz: IntEnz view
- BRENDA: BRENDA entry
- ExPASy: NiceZyme view
- KEGG: KEGG entry
- MetaCyc: metabolic pathway
- PRIAM: profile
- PDB structures: RCSB PDB PDBe PDBsum
Search
- PMC: articles
- PubMed: articles
- NCBI: proteins

NADP-retinol dehydrogenase (EC 1.1.1.300, all-trans retinal reductase, all-trans-retinol dehydrogenase, NADP(H)-dependent retinol dehydrogenase/reductase, RDH11, RDH12, RDH13, RDH14, retinol dehydrogenase 12, retinol dehydrogenase 14, retinol dehydrogenase (NADP^{+}), RalR1, PSDR1) is an enzyme with systematic name retinol:NADP^{+} oxidoreductase. This enzyme catalyses the following chemical reaction:

retinol
+ NADP^{+}
H^{+}
H^{+}
retinal
+ NADPH

This enzyme has greater catalytic efficiency in the reductive direction.
