= CBR =

CBR may refer to:

== Business and organizations ==
- CBR Innovation Network (or Canberra Innovation Network), a government initiative
- Central Bank of Russia
- Center for Bio-Ethical Reform, an American anti-abortion non-profit organization
- Centre for Blood Research, at the University of British Columbia, in Canada
- Central Board of Revenue, the Pakistan department for revenue collection
- Championship Bull Riding, a rodeo organization in Texas, USA
- Cimenteries et Briqueteries Réunies, a former Belgian company, now part of HeidelbergCement

== Comics ==
- .cbr, a file extension for comic book archive files
- Comic Book Resources, a news and discussion website now known by its acronym

== Radio ==
- CBR (AM), a radio station in Calgary, Alberta, Canada
- CBR-FM, a radio station in Calgary, Alberta, Canada
- CBR, former call sign of radio station CBU in Vancouver, British Columbia, Canada

== Science, medicine, and engineering ==
- California bearing ratio, a strength measurement of material under a paved area
- Cannabinoid receptor, a type of cell membrane receptor
- Carbonyl reductase genes: CBR1 and CBR3
- Case-based reasoning, an artificial intelligence technique
- Central benzodiazepine receptor, the receptor for benzodiazepines in the central nervous system
- Confidence-based repetition, one technique used in spaced repetition, especially for learning via digital flashcards
- Crude birth rate, a measure of live births
- Community-based rehabilitation, programs for the disabled
- Cosmic background radiation
- Critical body residue, the measure of toxicity in tissue residue

== Telecommunications ==
- Constant bitrate, in telecommunication, sound and music formats
- Constraint-based routing, in telecommunication and computer networks
- Content-based routing or router, a type of application-oriented networking

== Transport ==
- Canberra Airport, IATA airport code CBR
- Canberra MRT station, Singapore
- Chesapeake Beach Railway, a former railroad from Washington, D.C. to Maryland, USA
- Cleburne (Amtrak station), Texas, USA
- Cooksbridge railway station, in Sussex, England
- Honda CBR series, a line of sports motorbikes

== Other uses ==
- CBR Building, an office building situated in Watermael-Boitsfort, Brussels, Belgium, former headquarter of Cimenteries et Briqueteries Réunies
- Captive bead ring, a type of body piercing jewelry
- Chesapeake Bay Retriever, a dog breed
- Cost-benefit ratio, in economics, also named benefit–cost ratio (BCR)
- Crash Bandicoot Racing, Japanese name for the Crash Team Racing video game
- Carpathian Biosphere Reserve, a nature reserve in eastern Europe
- CBR, a sports and marketing term for Canberra, Australia
- CBR, car plate designation of Brodnica, in Poland

== See also ==
- Chemical, biological, radiological, and nuclear (CBRN), a category of hazardous incidents or weapons, and its subset Chemical, biological and radiological (CBR)
