= TMEM169 =

Protein-coding gene in humans

Identifiers
- Aliases: TMEM169, transmembrane protein 169
- External IDs: MGI: 2442781; GeneCards: TMEM169

Gene location (Human)
Chr.	Chromosome 2 (human)
Band	2q35	Start	216,081,866 bp
Band	2q35	End	216,102,783 bp

Gene location (Mouse)
Chr.	Chromosome 1 (mouse)
Band	1|1 C3	Start	72,323,528 bp
Band	1|1 C3	End	72,342,263 bp
RNA expression pattern
Bgee	Human / Mouse (ortholog); Top expressed in: buccal mucosa cell; ganglionic eminence; secondary oocyte; prefrontal cortex; stromal cell of endometrium; Brodmann area 9; ventricular zone; cerebellar cortex; cerebellar hemisphere; gonad / Top expressed in: secondary oocyte; zygote; proximal tubule; primary oocyte; right kidney; trigeminal ganglion; ganglionic eminence; neural tube; dentate gyrus of hippocampal formation granule cell; supraoptic nucleus; More reference expression data
BioGPS	n/a
Orthologs
Databases	NCBI: entry; OMA: entry
Species	Human	Mouse
Entrez	92691	271711
Ensembl	ENSG00000163449	ENSMUSG00000026188
UniProt	Q96HH4	Q8BG50
RefSeq (mRNA)	NM_001142310; NM_001142311; NM_001142312; NM_138390	NM_175564
RefSeq (protein)	NP_001135782; NP_001135783; NP_001135784; NP_612399	NP_780773
Location (UCSC)	Chr 2: 216.08 – 216.1 Mb	Chr 1: 72.32 – 72.34 Mb
PubMed search
- Wikidata
View/Edit Human	View/Edit Mouse

Transmembrane protein 169 (TMEM169) in humans is encoded by TMEM169 gene. The aliases of TMEM169 include FLJ34263, DKFZp781L2456, and LOC92691. TMEM169 has the highest expression in the brain, particularly the fetal brain. TMEM169 has homologs mammals, reptiles, amphibians, birds, fish, chordates and invertebrates. The most distantly related homolog of TMEM169 is Anopheles albimanus.

== Gene ==
=== Locus ===
The gene is located on human chromosome 2(2q35) and spans 20,918 bases (216,081,866-216,102,783) on the + strand. The gene contains four exons in total. The direct neighbors of TMEM169 include XRCC5 (X-ray repair cross complementing 5) and PECR (peroxisomal trans-2-enoyl-CoA reductase).

== Transcripts ==
Transcription of TMEM169 gene produces five alternatively spliced variants to generate four variants of the transcript. The variants all code for the same protein and have differences within the 5’ UTR region. Variant 1 is the longest transcript (NM_001142310.2) and consists of 3,408 base pairs and four exons.

== Protein ==
All four transcripts encode for the same protein (TMEM169) consisting of 297 amino acids. According to SAPS the molecular weight of protein TMEM169 is 33.6 kdal and it has an overall net negative charge (-5.7%). TMEM169 has an isoelectric point of 4.76.

=== Domains ===
There are two transmembrane domains of Homo sapiens TMEM169 located at amino acids 160-180 and 211–231. The N and C terminus are both located in the cytoplasmic domain. The conceptual translation provides further annotation of Homo sapiens TMEM169 protein.

=== Secondary Structure ===
The specific structure of TMEM169 is unknown, although includes both alpha helices and beta sheets.

== Gene level regulation ==
=== Promoter ===
The promoter (GXP_6745619) is 1242 base pairs at coordinates 216080866–216082107. It supports 11 coding transcripts.

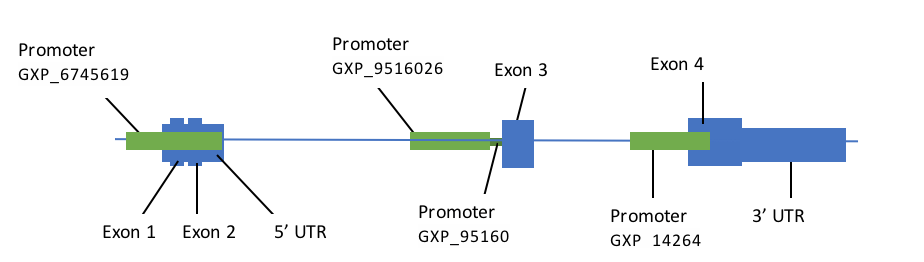
Schematic illustration of TMEM169 promoters (green) and exons (blue).

Promoter	Size	Coordinates	Supporting Transcripts
GXP_6745619 (+)	1242 bp	216080866-216082107	11
GXP_9516026 (+)	1040 bp	216094326-216095365	Computational
GXP_9516027 (+)	1040 bp	216094696-216095735	Computational
GXP_142640 (+)	1040 bp	216099253-216100292	1

Table 2. There are four promoters that result from TMEM169 search on Genomatix.

=== Expression pattern ===
==== RNA sequencing ====
RNA sequencing data revealed TMEM169 is expressed ubiquitously, although it displays high expression in the brain, particularly during fetal development. HPA RNA-seq normal tissues for TMEM169 were obtained from 95 human tissue samples. The HPA RNA-seq demonstrates highest expression of TMEM169 in the brain (RPKM=3.159). Particularly, in the fetal brain (RPKM= 1.583) and cerebellum(RPKM=0.795).

==== NCBI GEO Profile Microarray ====
GEO Profile: GDS3113/220527

The highest expression of TMEM169 is found in the fetal brain. TMEM169 tends to have a high expression in the brain relative to other tissues, although not to other genes.

==== Antibodies ====
The use of polyclonal TMEM169 antibody (NBP2-69796) of a human melanoma cell line (SK-MEL-30) in the host of rabbit demonstrates TMEM169 localization to nucleoplasm, cytosol and centrosome. Strong positivity in glial cells is revealed through immunohistochemical staining of the human cerebral cortex with antibody HPA074877.

== Protein Level Regulation ==
=== Post-transalational modifications ===
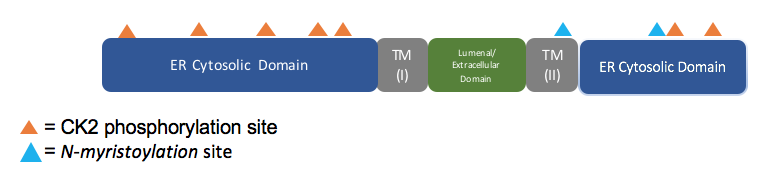
Conceptual Diagram of Homo sapiens TMEM169 highlighting domains and post-translational modifications

The MyHits Tool revealed two types of conserved predicted post-translational modifications.

Predicted Modification	Homo Sapiens Amino Acid Location
Casein Kinase 2 phosphorylation sites	5-8, 47–50, 57–60, 62–65, 123–26, 138–141, 142–145, 269–272, 284–287
N-myristoylation site	226-231, 261–266

== Homology ==
TMEM169 is well-conserved across strict orthologs shown by the following multiple sequence alignment created Clustal using BoxShade. The multiple sequence alignment of distant orthologs highlighting the transmembrane domains was also created using Clustal and BoxShade. The red boxes illustrate conserved transmembrane domains across orthologs.

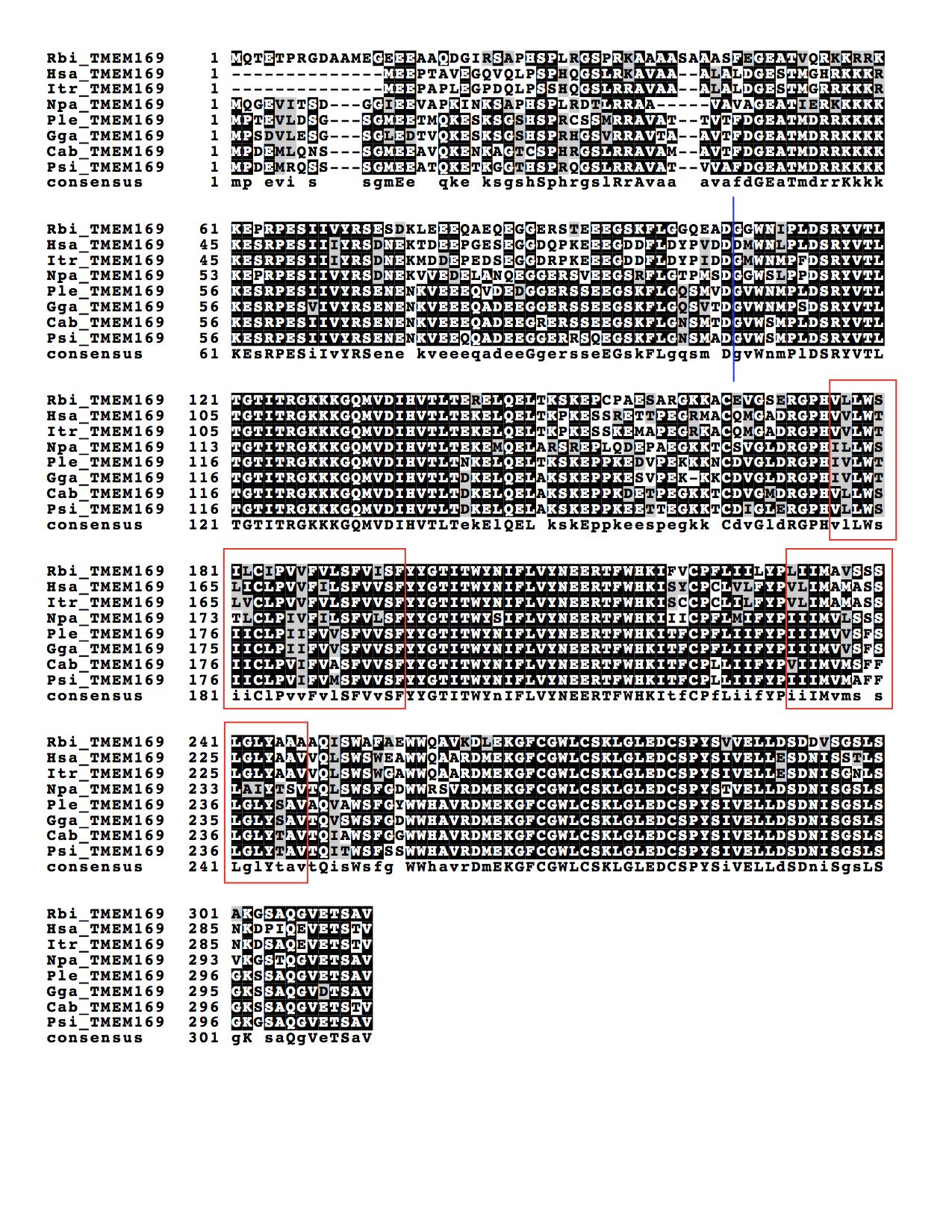
The amino acid conservation of strict Homo sapiens TMEM169 orthologs is illustrated. The darker shade reflects higher conservation. The blue line reveals exon/exon boundary. The red boxes identify transmembrane domains.

=== Orthologs ===
Orthologs are found in over 300 organisms within the kingdom metazoan. There are not any orthologs found in fungi or plants. Invertebrates are the most distantly related orthologs, according to BLAST searches. The subset of closely related organisms include mammals, reptiles, birds, and amphibians (E-value 1e-177 to 1e-124). These orthologs range from 78% to 93% sequence similarity to the human protein. Moderately related orthologs to human TMEM169 protein include fish and cephalochordates (similarity= 62%-75%; E-value= 3e-120 to 1e-71). Protein sequences of hemichordates, arthropods, and mollusks are the most distantly related to the human protein sequence (similarity= 56%-64%; E-value= 2e-58 to 1e-44). The most distantly related organism with TMEM169 ortholog is Anopheles albimanus, within the taxonomic group Arthropoda. The size of the gene family for Anopheles albimanus is one and there is only one isoform.

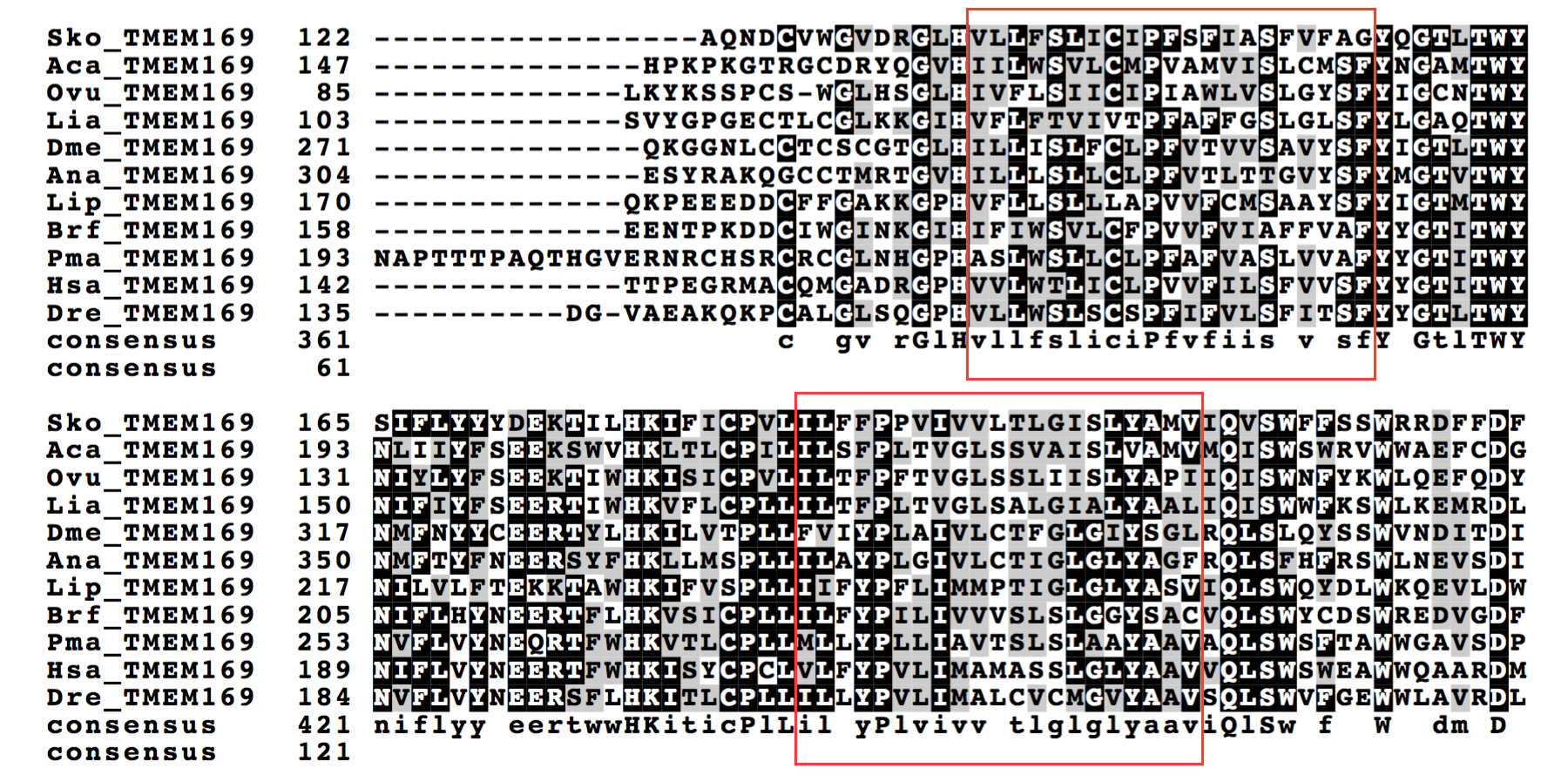
A portion of amino acid conservation of distant Homo sapiens TMEM169 orthologs is illustrated, highlighting transmembrane domains. The darker shade reflects higher conservation. The red boxes identify transmembrane domains.

Scientific Name	Common name	Taxonomic group	Accession number	Date of Divergence (MYA)	% identity
Homo sapiens	Human	Mammalia	NP_001135782.1	0	100
Ictidomys tridecemlineatus	Thirteen-lined ground squirrel	Mammalia	XP_005331895.1	90	90
Chelonoidis abingdonii	Pinta island tortoise	Reptilla	XP_032620330	312	69
Pelodiscus sinensis	Chinese softshell turtle	Reptilia	XP_006124795	312	68
Phaethon lepturus	White tailed tropic bird	Aves	XP_010279821.1	312	67
Gallus gallus	Chicken	Aves	XP_015145533.1	318	66
Rhinatrema bivittatum	Two-lined caecilian	Amphibia	XP_029460980.1	352	66
Nanorana parkeri	High himalaya frog	Amphibia	XP_018409958.1	353	65
Danio rerio	Zebrafish	Actinopterygii	NP_001313389.1	435	50
Callorhinchus milii	Australian ghostshark	Chondrichthyes	XP_007908296.1	473	64
Rhincodon typus	Whale shark	Chondrichthyes	XP_020389226.1	473	60
Petromyzon marinus	Sea lamprey	Petrymyzontidae	XP_032801904.1	615	51
Acanthaster planci	Crown of thorns starfish	Echinodermata	XP_022081757.1	627	40
Brachiostoma floridae	Florida lancelet	Cephalochordata	XP_035657488.1	684	54
Saccoglossus kowalevskii	Acorn worm	Hemichordata	XP_002740626	684	45
Drosophila melangogaster	Fruit fly	Arthropoda	NP_650031.1	797	45
Limulus polyphemus	Atlantic horseshoe crab	Arthropoda	XP_022256315	797	51
Octopus vulgaris	Octopus	Mollusca	XP_029635540.1	797	41
Lingula anatina	Lingula anantina	Mollusca	XP_013413871.1	797	39
Anopheles albimanus	Mosquito strain	Arthropoda	XP_035794912.1	797	38

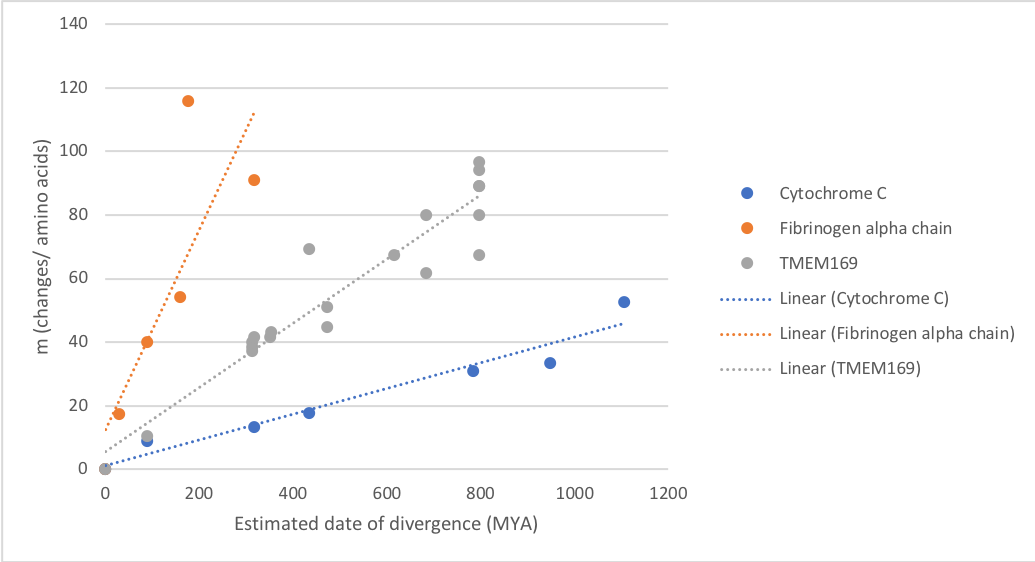
Rate of Divergence of TMEM169

Table 1. Identified orthologs of Homo sapiens TMEM169 protein. The table is organized by increasing DOD (data of divergence from the human lineage) and then by sequence similarity to the human protein (%). The date of divergence was calculated using TimeTree. Seq. is an abbreviation for sequence.

=== Evolutionary History ===
TMEM169 gene first appeared in invertebrates, more specifically in arthropods and mollusks. The approximate date of divergence from humans for arthropods and mollusks is 797 million years ago (MYA). Based upon comparison of the evolution for cytochrome C (a quickly evolving protein) and fibrinogen alpha chain (a slowly evolving protein), TMEM169 gene is evolving at a moderate pace.

== Interacting Proteins ==
RhoU (rho-related GTP-binding protein RhoU) is known to interact with TMEM169 according to PSICQUIC. The pull down assay revealed RhoU as a protein interaction with TMEM169.

== Clinical Relevance- Disease Association ==
A single nucleotide polymorphism of TMEM169, defined as rs3821104, is one of two SNP's that revealed strong association (p<0.1) with Chronic Obstructive Pulmonary Disease (COPD) within the international COPD genetics network. Additionally, gene TMEM169 is one of the four most down-regulated genes in response to oxidative stress; it is downregulated by 0.50 fold in patients with myocardial infarctions. The gene has association to two different birth defects; neural tube defects and preeclampsia. An amino acid change (p.K41I) in TMEM169 is known to cause neural tube defects and hypermethylated loci cg20968678, associated with TMEM169, leads to early onset preeclampsia.
