= RDH10 =

Protein-coding gene in humans

Identifiers
- Aliases: RDH10, SDR16C4, retinol dehydrogenase 10 (all-trans), retinol dehydrogenase 10
- External IDs: OMIM: 607599; MGI: 1924238; GeneCards: RDH10
Enzyme activity
EC #	BRENDA	ExPASy	KEGG	MetaCyc
1.1.1.300	↗	↗	↗	↗

Gene location (Human)
Chr.	Chromosome 8 (human)
Band	8q21.11	Start	73,294,602 bp
Band	8q21.11	End	73,325,281 bp

Gene location (Mouse)
Chr.	Chromosome 1 (mouse)
Band	1 A3|1 4.94 cM	Start	16,175,998 bp
Band	1 A3|1 4.94 cM	End	16,203,958 bp
RNA expression pattern
Bgee	Human / Mouse (ortholog); Top expressed in: nasal epithelium; palpebral conjunctiva; decidua; oocyte; mucosa of paranasal sinus; trachea; secondary oocyte; jejunal mucosa; bronchus; bronchial epithelial cell / Top expressed in: retinal pigment epithelium; ciliary body; interventricular septum; molar; vestibular sensory epithelium; rectum; primary oocyte; gastrula; utricle; seminal vesicula; More reference expression data
BioGPS	n/a
Gene ontology
Molecular function	oxidoreductase activity; NADP-retinol dehydrogenase activity; NAD-retinol dehydrogenase activity
Cellular component	cytoplasm; integral component of membrane; nucleus; cell body; membrane; endoplasmic reticulum; endoplasmic reticulum membrane; organelle membrane; intracellular membrane-bounded organelle; lipid droplet
Biological process	bud elongation involved in lung branching; neural crest cell development; embryonic camera-type eye development; nose development; embryonic organ development; embryonic forelimb morphogenesis; gonad development; ear development; embryonic viscerocranium morphogenesis; retinoid metabolic process; retinol metabolic process; retinoic acid biosynthetic process; in utero embryonic development; primary lung bud formation; retinal metabolic process; metanephros development; visual perception; animal organ morphogenesis; positive regulation of retinoic acid biosynthetic process
Sources:Amigo / QuickGO
Orthologs
Databases	NCBI: entry; OMA: entry
Species	Human	Mouse
Entrez	157506	98711
Ensembl	ENSG00000121039	ENSMUSG00000025921
UniProt	Q8IZV5	Q8VCH7
RefSeq (mRNA)	NM_172037	NM_133832
RefSeq (protein)	NP_742034	NP_598593
Location (UCSC)	Chr 8: 73.29 – 73.33 Mb	Chr 1: 16.18 – 16.2 Mb
PubMed search
- Wikidata
View/Edit Human	View/Edit Mouse

Retinol dehydrogenase 10 is an enzyme that in humans is encoded by the RDH10 gene on chromosome 8.

== Function ==
Retinol dehydrogenase 10

Identifiers
- EC no.: 1.1.1.105
- Alt. names: NAD^{+}-retinol dehydrogenase

Databases
- BRENDA: enzyme data
- ExPASy: NiceZyme view
- KEGG: enzyme entry
- MetaCyc: metabolic pathway
- Rhea: reactions
- PDB structures: RCSB PDB PDBe PDBsum
- Gene Ontology: AmiGO / QuickGO
Search
- PMC: articles
- PubMed: articles
- NCBI: proteins

RDH10 is a membrane-bound NAD^{+}-dependent retinol dehydrogenase which belongs to the superfamily of short-chain dehydrogenases. RDH10 catalyzes the first oxidative step in retinoic acid biosynthesis:

all-trans-retinol+ NAD^{+} $\rightleftharpoons$ all-trans-retinal + NADH + H^{+}

Due to its preference for NAD^{+} rather than NADP^{+} as a cofactor, RDH10 functions near-exclusively in the oxidative direction under physiological conditions to increase levels of retinal and retinoic acid.

RDH10 has also been shown to act on 11-cis-retinol via interactions with CRALBP and RPE65.

RDH10 plays an essential role in organ, limb, and craniofacial development during embryogenesis.

== Clinical significance ==
RDH10 loss of function mutations in mice are embryonically lethal. Despite its similarity to other retinol dehydrogenases, RDH10 is not associated with any known human retinal disease. RDH10 may partially compensate for loss of RDH5 function in fundus albipunctatus. RDH10 overexpression is associated with brain and spinal cord glioma progression. Serum levels of RDH10 may serve as a biomarker for type 2 diabetes or metabolic dysfunction–associated steatotic liver disease.
