= DHRS7B =

Protein-coding gene in the species Homo sapiens

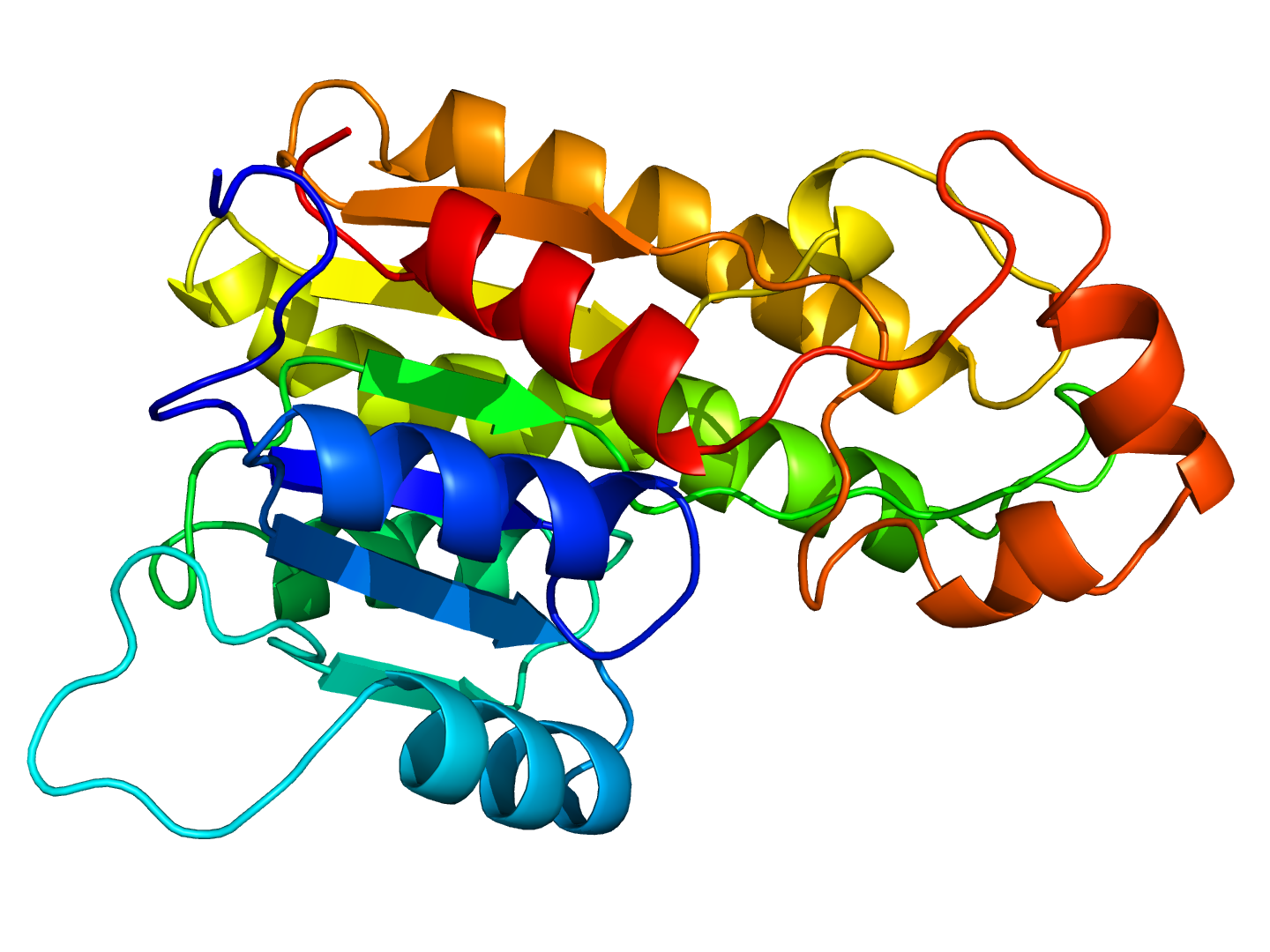

Identifiers
- Aliases: DHRS7B, SDR32C1, CGI-93, dehydrogenase/reductase (SDR family) member 7B, dehydrogenase/reductase 7B
- External IDs: OMIM: 616160; MGI: 2384931; GeneCards: DHRS7B
Enzyme activity
EC #	BRENDA	ExPASy	KEGG	MetaCyc
1.1.1.101	↗	↗	↗	↗

Gene location (Human)
Chr.	Chromosome 17 (human)
Band	17p11.2	Start	21,123,364 bp
Band	17p11.2	End	21,193,265 bp

Gene location (Mouse)
Chr.	Chromosome 11 (mouse)
Band	11|11 B2	Start	60,721,457 bp
Band	11|11 B2	End	60,751,021 bp
RNA expression pattern
Bgee	Human / Mouse (ortholog); Top expressed in: muscle of thigh; olfactory zone of nasal mucosa; gastrocnemius muscle; mucosa of transverse colon; apex of heart; triceps brachii muscle; Achilles tendon; left ventricle; left testis; bronchial epithelial cell / Top expressed in: Ileal epithelium; spermatocyte; brown adipose tissue; yolk sac; right kidney; lactiferous gland; duodenum; jejunum; intercostal muscle; proximal tubule; More reference expression data
BioGPS	n/a
Gene ontology
Molecular function	oxidoreductase activity; molecular function
Cellular component	integral component of membrane; endoplasmic reticulum membrane; membrane; endoplasmic reticulum
Biological process	biological process; ether lipid biosynthetic process; neutrophil differentiation; macromolecule metabolic process
Sources:Amigo / QuickGO
Orthologs
Databases	NCBI: entry; OMA: entry
Species	Human	Mouse
Entrez	25979	216820
Ensembl	ENSG00000109016	ENSMUSG00000042569
UniProt	Q6IAN0	Q99J47
RefSeq (mRNA)	NM_015510; NM_001330159	NM_001172112; NM_145428
RefSeq (protein)	NP_001317088; NP_056325	NP_001165583; NP_663403
Location (UCSC)	Chr 17: 21.12 – 21.19 Mb	Chr 11: 60.72 – 60.75 Mb
PubMed search
- Wikidata
View/Edit Human	View/Edit Mouse

Dehydrogenase/reductase (SDR family) member 7B is an enzyme encoded by the DHRS7B gene in humans, found on chromosome 17p11.2. DHRS7B encodes a protein that is predicted to function in steroid hormone regulation. A deletion in the chromosomal region 17p11.2 has been associated with Smith-Magenis Syndrome, a genetic developmental disorder.

== Gene ==
=== Overview ===
The DHRS7B gene is located on the positive strand of chromosome 17, beginning at position 21030258 and ending at position 21094836 (64579 bp). DHRS7B contains seven exons with no predicted alternate splice forms, resulting in an 1841 bp mRNA product.

Upstream of DHRS7B on the negative strand of chromosome 17p11.2 are the genes Coiled-coil domain containing 144 family, N-terminal-like (CCDC144NL) and Ubiquitin specific peptidase 22 (USP22). Downstream of DHSRS7B on the negative strand of chromosome 17p11.2 is the gene Transmembrane protein 11 (TMEM11), and on the positive strand is the gene Mitogen-activated protein kinase, kinase 3 (MAP2K3).

=== Gene expression ===
Microarray and EST data indicates that the DHRS7B gene is highly expressed in the testes, thyroid, kidneys, and adipose tissues. There is moderate expression in the brain, pancreas, mammary glands, and ovaries. Finally, there is little expression in spleen, thymus, tonsils, bone marrow, and bladder.

== Protein structure ==
The DHRS7B gene has a predicted protein product that is 325 amino acids, a molecular weight of 35.1 kDa, and an isoelectric point of 9.867. There is one predicted transmembrane domain in the protein sequence, a large neutrally charged region spanning residues 18-38. No signal peptides have been identified in DHRS7B; cellular localization remains unclear.

DHRS7B is a member of the short chain dehydrogenase/reductase (SDR) superfamily and possesses characteristic features of an SDR within the protein sequence. The following table identifies sequences in the protein and corresponding function.

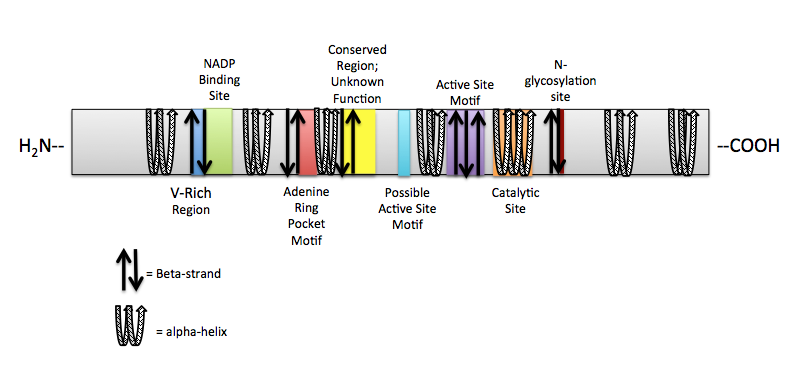
Predicted Features of DHRS7B Protein

Sequence	Function
"VVV"	Valine-rich region, unknown function
"TGXXXGXG"	NADP binding site
"NXXG"	Possible active site motif
"DXXD"	Adenine ring pocket motif
"GXXXXXSS"	Possible active site motif
"SXYXXXK"	Catalytic site, with upstream serine residue
"LXNNXG"	Conserved region, unknown function
"NLS"	N-glycosylation site

=== Interactions ===
In humans, DHRS7B has been shown to physically interact with other proteins such as Mediator complex subunit 19 (MED19) and Brain and reproductive expressed-modulator protein (BRE). MED19 was found to interact with DHRS7B through a two hybrid screening approach and plays a role as a co-activator in regulated transcription of most RNA polymerase II dependent genes. BRE is a component of the BRCA1-A complex, which recognizes Lys-63 linked ubiquitinated histones H2A and H2AX DNA lesion sites (identified using anti-tag coimmunoprecipitation). Other proteins interacting with DHRS7B have only been identified through text mining.

== Homology ==
=== Orthologs ===
Conservation of the DHRS7B protein sequence has been observed highly in mammals; moderately in reptiles, birds, fish and amphibians; minimally in invertebrates, insects, and fungi.

Genus/Species	Common name	Accession #	Sequence Length	Sequence Identity	Sequence Similarity	Notes
Homo sapiens	Human	NP_056325.2	325 aa	100%	100%	DHRS7B
Pan troglodytes	Chimpanzee	XP_511344.2	325 aa	99%	99%	Mammal
Pongo abelli	Sumatran orangutan	NP_001127381	325 aa	99%	99%	Mammal
Mustela putorius furo	Domestic ferret	AER97198	345 aa	88%	94%	Mammal
Canis familiaris	Dog	XP_536670	325 aa	87%	94%	Mammal
Gallus gallus	Chicken	XP_414804	309 aa	73%	87%	Bird
Anolis carolinensis	Lizard	XP_003226576	309 aa	68%	85%	Reptile
Salmo salar	Salmon	ACM08861	310 aa	64%	85%	Fish
Xenopus (silurana) tropicalis	Western clawed frog	NP_001072246	309 aa	68%	84%	Amphibia
Drosophila melanogaster	Fruit fly	NP_651717	326 aa	45%	63%	Insect
Strongylocentrotus purpuratus	Purple sea urchin	XP_790920	344 aa	34%	50%	Invertebrate
Saccharomyces cerevisiae S288C	Yeast	NP_013953	267 aa	33%	49%	Fungi

=== Paralogs ===
Paralogs of DHRS7B are all in the SDR superfamily and conservation of the SDR functional motifs was identified in a multiple sequence alignment.

Common name	Accession #	Sequence Length	Sequence Identity	Sequence Similarity
DHRS7B	NP_056325.2	325 aa	100%	100%
DHRS7C	AA_147025.1	308 aa	46%	66%
DHRS7	CAH56402	375 aa	37%	53%
HBD1	AAA58352	343 aa	35%	56%
RDH8	EAW84062	331 aa	34%	53%
RDH16	AAC39922	317 aa	33%	53%
KDSR	NP002026	332 aa	31%	51%
HSD11B1	AAK83653	292 aa	29%	50%
DHRS9	AAH58883	319 aa	29%	50%
RDH5	AAH28298	318 aa	30%	49%

== Clinical significance ==
DHRS7B has been identified in the Smith-Magenis Syndrome region, where a deletion in this chromosomal region (17p11.2) causes a genetic developmental disorder. In breast cancer cells expressing CD44 and CD24, DHRS7B expression was observed to be down regulated. CD44 is an antigen found on the surface of most cell types and functions as a receptor that binds tissue macromolecules. Additionally, it acts as an adhesion molecule for leukocytes on peripheral lymphoid organs and inflammation sites. CD24 is associated with B-cells, epithelial cells, and dendritic cells, functioning as an adhesion molecule and shown to enhance a tumor cell's capability of metastasizing.
