= DHRSX =

Protein-coding gene in humans

Identifiers
- Aliases: DHRSX, CXorf11, DHRS5X, DHRS5Y, DHRSXY, DHRSY, SDR46C1, SDR7C6, dehydrogenase/reductase (SDR family) X-linked, dehydrogenase/reductase X-linked
- External IDs: MGI: 2181510; GeneCards: DHRSX
Enzyme activity
EC #	BRENDA	ExPASy	KEGG	MetaCyc
1.1.1.441	↗	↗	↗	↗

Gene location (Human)
Chr.	X chromosome (human)
Band	Xp22.33 and Yp11.2	Start	2,219,506 bp
Band	Xp22.33 and Yp11.2	End	2,502,805 bp
RNA expression pattern
Bgee	Human / Mouse (ortholog); Top expressed in: stromal cell of endometrium; ventricular zone; ganglionic eminence; body of pancreas; apex of heart; right atrium; right auricle of heart; right lobe of liver; gastrocnemius muscle; left ventricle / n/a; More reference expression data
BioGPS	n/a
Gene ontology
Molecular function	oxidoreductase activity
Cellular component	extracellular region
Biological process	positive regulation of autophagy
Sources:Amigo / QuickGO
Orthologs
Databases	NCBI: entry; OMA: entry
Species	Human	Mouse
Entrez	207063	236082
Ensembl	ENSG00000169084	ENSMUSG00000063897
UniProt	Q8N5I4	Q8VBZ0
RefSeq (mRNA)	NM_145177	NM_001033326
RefSeq (protein)	NP_660160	n/a
Location (UCSC)	Chr X: 2.22 – 2.5 Mb	n/a
PubMed search
- Wikidata
View/Edit Human	View/Edit Mouse

Dehydrogenase/reductase (SDR family) X-linked also known as DHRSX is an enzyme which in humans is encoded by the pseudoautosomal DHRSX gene. DHRSX is a member of the short-chain dehydrogenase family of oxidoreductase enzymes.

DHRSX is required for two steps in the biosynthesis of dolichol: i) the NAD^{+}-dependent conversion of polyprenol to its aldehyde analogue, polyprenal; ii) the NADPH-dependent reduction of dolichal to dolichol. Dolichol is a long polyisoprenoid lipid required as the carrier of mono- and oligosaccharides in the processes of N-glycosylation, C-/O-mannosylation and the formation of glycosylphosphatidylinositol (GPI) anchors.
