= RDH8 =

Protein-coding gene in humans

Identifiers
- Aliases: RDH8, PRRDH, SDR28C2, retinol dehydrogenase 8 (all-trans), retinol dehydrogenase 8
- External IDs: OMIM: 608575; MGI: 2685028; GeneCards: RDH8
Enzyme activity
EC #	BRENDA	ExPASy	KEGG	MetaCyc
1.1.1.300	↗	↗	↗	↗

Gene location (Human)
Chr.	Chromosome 19 (human)
Band	19p13.2	Start	10,013,249 bp
Band	19p13.2	End	10,022,279 bp

Gene location (Mouse)
Chr.	Chromosome 9 (mouse)
Band	9|9 A3	Start	20,729,799 bp
Band	9|9 A3	End	20,737,413 bp
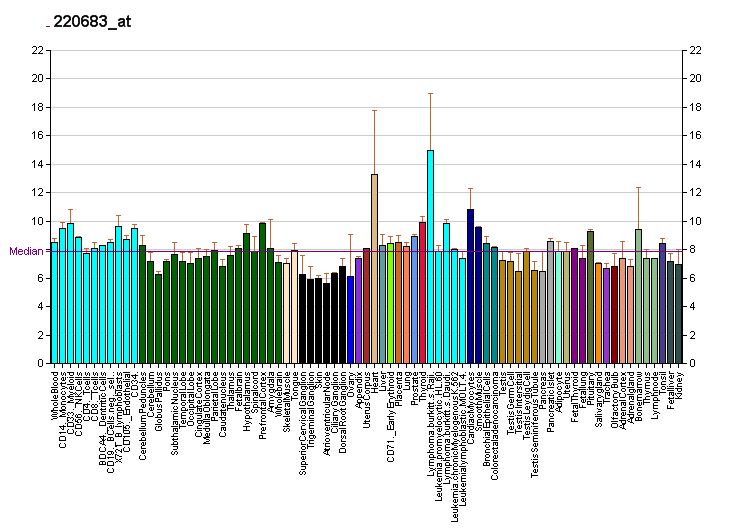
RNA expression pattern
Bgee	Human / Mouse (ortholog); Top expressed in: sperm; right testis; left testis; retinal pigment epithelium; islet of Langerhans; human kidney; sural nerve; cecum; breast; mammary gland / Top expressed in: neural layer of retina; hypothalamus; muscle of thigh; lens; skeletal muscle tissue; More reference expression data
BioGPS	More reference expression data
Gene ontology
Molecular function	oxidoreductase activity; NADP-retinol dehydrogenase activity; estradiol 17-beta-dehydrogenase activity; NAD-retinol dehydrogenase activity
Cellular component	cytoplasm; integral component of membrane; integral component of plasma membrane; membrane
Biological process	estrogen biosynthetic process; retinol metabolic process; response to stimulus; visual perception; steroid biosynthetic process
Sources:Amigo / QuickGO
Orthologs
Databases	NCBI: entry; OMA: entry
Species	Human	Mouse
Entrez	50700	235033
Ensembl	ENSG00000080511	ENSMUSG00000053773
UniProt	Q9NYR8	D3Z6W3
RefSeq (mRNA)	NM_015725	NM_001030290
RefSeq (protein)	NP_056540	NP_001025461
Location (UCSC)	Chr 19: 10.01 – 10.02 Mb	Chr 9: 20.73 – 20.74 Mb
PubMed search
- Wikidata
View/Edit Human	View/Edit Mouse

Retinol dehydrogenase 8 is an enzyme that in humans is encoded by the RDH8 gene.

All-trans-retinol dehydrogenase (RDH8) is a visual cycle enzyme that reduces all-trans-retinal to all-trans-retinol in the presence of NADPH. It is a member of the short chain dehydrogenase/reductase family and is located in the outer segments of the photoreceptor cells; hence it is also known as photoreceptor retinol dehydrogenase. It is important in the visual cycle by beginning the rhodopsin regeneration pathway by reducing all-trans-retinal, the product of bleached and hydrolysed rhodopsin. This is a rate-limiting step in the visual cycle.[supplied by OMIM]
