= 3-dehydrosphinganine reductase =

Protein-coding gene in the species Homo sapiens

Identifiers
- EC no.: 1.1.1.102
- CAS no.: 37250-36-5

Databases
- BRENDA: enzyme data
- ExPASy: NiceZyme view
- KEGG: enzyme entry
- MetaCyc: metabolic pathway
- Rhea: reactions
- PDB structures: RCSB PDB PDBe PDBsum
- Gene Ontology: AmiGO / QuickGO
Search
- PMC: articles
- PubMed: articles
- NCBI: proteins

KDSR

Identifiers
- Aliases: KDSR, Kdsr, 6330410P18Rik, 9430079B08Rik, Fvt1, DHSR, SDR35C1, 3-ketodihydrosphingosine reductase, 3-dehydrosphinganine reductase, EKVP4
- External IDs: OMIM: 136440; MGI: 1918000; GeneCards: KDSR
Enzyme activity
EC #	BRENDA	ExPASy	KEGG	MetaCyc
1.1.1.102	↗	↗	↗	↗

Gene location (Human)
Chr.	Chromosome 18 (human)
Band	18q21.33	Start	63,327,726 bp
Band	18q21.33	End	63,367,228 bp

Gene location (Mouse)
Chr.	Chromosome 1 (mouse)
Band	1|1 E2.1	Start	106,648,189 bp
Band	1|1 E2.1	End	106,687,457 bp
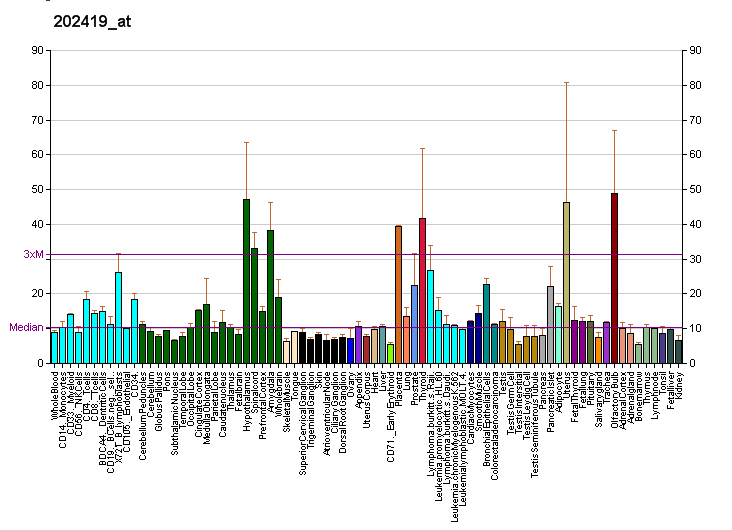
RNA expression pattern
Bgee	Human / Mouse (ortholog); Top expressed in: endothelial cell; buccal mucosa cell; C1 segment; nipple; skin of leg; palpebral conjunctiva; epithelium of colon; skin of abdomen; parotid gland; internal globus pallidus / Top expressed in: decidua; gastrula; otolith organ; utricle; cumulus cell; retinal pigment epithelium; pineal gland; iris; otic vesicle; ciliary body; More reference expression data
BioGPS	More reference expression data
Gene ontology
Molecular function	oxidoreductase activity; 3-dehydrosphinganine reductase activity
Cellular component	integral component of membrane; endoplasmic reticulum membrane; endoplasmic reticulum; membrane; extracellular space
Biological process	3-keto-sphinganine metabolic process; sphingolipid biosynthetic process; lipid metabolism; sphingolipid metabolic process
Sources:Amigo / QuickGO
Orthologs
Databases	NCBI: entry; OMA: entry
Species	Human	Mouse
Entrez	2531	70750
Ensembl	ENSG00000119537	ENSMUSG00000009905
UniProt	Q06136	Q6GV12
RefSeq (mRNA)	NM_002035	NM_027534; NM_001316750
RefSeq (protein)	NP_002026	NP_001303679; NP_081810
Location (UCSC)	Chr 18: 63.33 – 63.37 Mb	Chr 1: 106.65 – 106.69 Mb
PubMed search
- Wikidata
View/Edit Human	View/Edit Mouse

3-dehydrosphinganine reductase (EC 1.1.1.102) also known as 3-ketodihydrosphingosine reductase (KDSR) or follicular variant translocation protein 1 (FVT1) is an enzyme that in humans is encoded by the KDSR gene.

== Function ==
3-dehydrosphinganine reductase catalyzes the chemical reaction:

sphinganine
+ NADP^{+}
H^{+}
H^{+}
3-ketosphinganine
+ NADPH

The two substrates of this enzyme are sphinganine and oxidised nicotinamide adenine dinucleotide phosphate (NADP^{+}). Its products are 3-ketosphinganine, reduced NADPH, and a proton.

This enzyme belongs to the family of oxidoreductases, specifically those acting on the CH-OH group of donor with NAD^{+} or NADP^{+} as acceptor. This enzyme participates in sphingolipid metabolism.

== Tissue distribution ==
Follicular lymphoma variant translocation 1 is a secreted protein which is weakly expressed in hematopoietic tissue.

== Clinical significance ==
FVT1 shows a high rate of transcription in some T cell malignancies and in phytohemagglutinin-stimulated lymphocytes. The proximity of FVT1 to BCL2 suggests that it may participate in the tumoral process.
