= DHRS4 =

Protein-coding gene in the species Homo sapiens

Identifiers
- Aliases: DHRS4, CR, NRDR, PHCR, PSCD, SCAD-SRL, SDR-SRL, SDR25C1, SDR25C2, dehydrogenase/reductase (SDR family) member 4, dehydrogenase/reductase 4
- External IDs: OMIM: 611596; MGI: 90169; GeneCards: DHRS4
Available structures
PDB	Ortholog search: PDBe RCSB
PDB	List of PDB id codes 3O4R
Enzyme activity
EC #	BRENDA	ExPASy	KEGG	MetaCyc
1.1.1.184	↗	↗	↗	↗

Gene location (Human)
Chr.	Chromosome 14 (human)
Band	14q11.2	Start	23,953,734 bp
Band	14q11.2	End	23,969,279 bp

Gene location (Mouse)
Chr.	Chromosome 14 (mouse)
Band	14 C3|14 28.19 cM	Start	55,716,215 bp
Band	14 C3|14 28.19 cM	End	55,727,797 bp
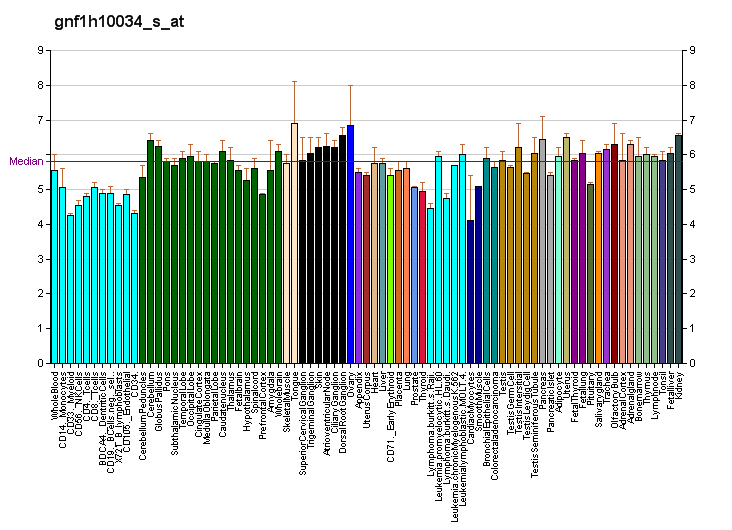
RNA expression pattern
Bgee	Human / Mouse (ortholog); Top expressed in: right lobe of liver; duodenum; human kidney; mucosa of transverse colon; monocyte; apex of heart; left adrenal cortex; left ventricle; gastrocnemius muscle; right adrenal cortex / Top expressed in: right kidney; human kidney; proximal tubule; left lobe of liver; duodenum; gallbladder; submandibular gland; brown adipose tissue; Paneth cell; saccule; More reference expression data
BioGPS	More reference expression data
Gene ontology
Molecular function	oxidoreductase activity; alcohol dehydrogenase [NAD(P)+ activity]; signaling receptor binding; oxidoreductase activity, acting on NAD(P)H, quinone or similar compound as acceptor; carbonyl reductase (NADPH) activity; 3-keto sterol reductase activity; NADP-retinol dehydrogenase activity
Cellular component	peroxisomal membrane; peroxisome; extracellular exosome; endoplasmic reticulum membrane; mitochondrion; nucleus; peroxisomal matrix; cytosol
Biological process	steroid metabolic process; alcohol metabolic process; protein tetramerization; cellular ketone metabolic process; retinol metabolic process; protein targeting to peroxisome
Sources:Amigo / QuickGO
Orthologs
Databases	NCBI: entry; OMA: entry
Species	Human	Mouse
Entrez	10901	28200
Ensembl	ENSG00000157326; ENSG00000284807	ENSMUSG00000022210
UniProt	Q9BTZ2	Q99LB2
RefSeq (mRNA)	NM_001282987; NM_001282988; NM_001282989; NM_001282990; NM_001282991 NM_021004	NM_001037938; NM_030686
RefSeq (protein)	NP_001269916; NP_001269917; NP_001269918; NP_001269919; NP_001269920 NP_066284	NP_001033027; NP_109611
Location (UCSC)	Chr 14: 23.95 – 23.97 Mb	Chr 14: 55.72 – 55.73 Mb
PubMed search
- Wikidata
View/Edit Human	View/Edit Mouse

Dehydrogenase/reductase SDR family member 4 is an enzyme that in humans is encoded by the DHRS4 gene.
