= RDH11 =

Protein-coding gene in humans

Identifiers
- Aliases: RDH11, ARSDR1, CGI82, HCBP12, MDT1, PSDR1, RALR1, SCALD, SDR7C1, RDJCSS, retinol dehydrogenase 11 (all-trans/9-cis/11-cis), retinol dehydrogenase 11
- External IDs: OMIM: 607849; MGI: 102581; GeneCards: RDH11
Enzyme activity
EC #	BRENDA	ExPASy	KEGG	MetaCyc
1.1.1.300	↗	↗	↗	↗

Gene location (Human)
Chr.	Chromosome 14 (human)
Band	14q24.1	Start	67,676,800 bp
Band	14q24.1	End	67,695,793 bp
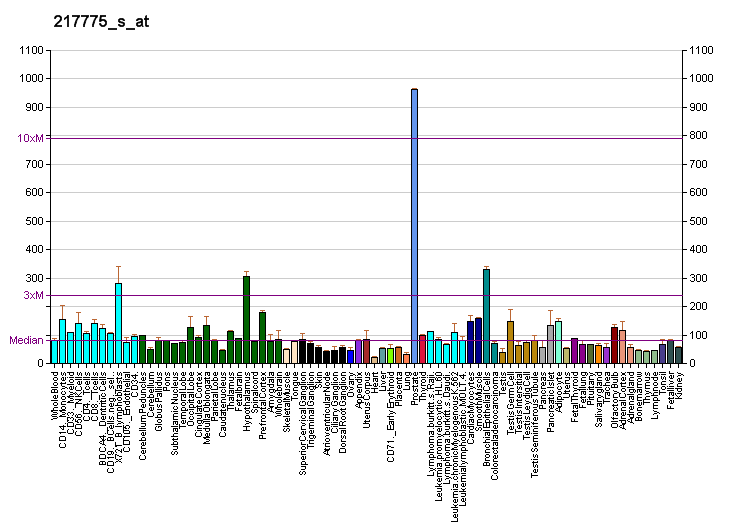

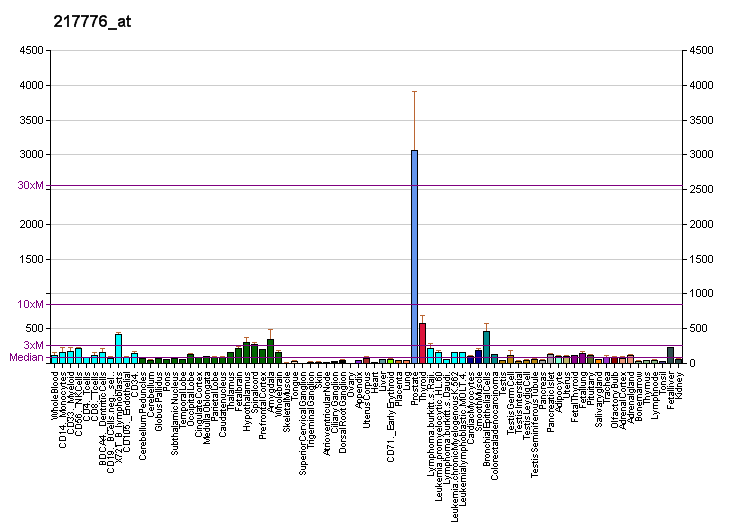
RNA expression pattern
Bgee	Human / Mouse (ortholog); Top expressed in: retinal pigment epithelium; islet of Langerhans; Brodmann area 23; kidney tubule; pars compacta; tibia; skin of thigh; pars reticulata; corpus epididymis; vulva / n/a; More reference expression data
BioGPS	More reference expression data
Gene ontology
Molecular function	oxidoreductase activity; oxidoreductase activity, acting on the CH-OH group of donors, NAD or NADP as acceptor; NADP-retinol dehydrogenase activity; NAD-retinol dehydrogenase activity; protein binding; aldehyde dehydrogenase (NADP+) activity
Cellular component	integral component of membrane; intracellular anatomical structure; endoplasmic reticulum membrane; membrane; endoplasmic reticulum; photoreceptor inner segment
Biological process	retinoid metabolic process; retinol metabolic process; retinal metabolic process; adaptation of rhodopsin mediated signaling; visual perception; cellular detoxification of aldehyde
Sources:Amigo / QuickGO
Orthologs
Databases	NCBI: entry; OMA: entry
Species	Human	Mouse
Entrez	51109	17252
Ensembl	ENSG00000072042	n/a
UniProt	Q8TC12	Q9QYF1
RefSeq (mRNA)	NM_016026; NM_001252650	NM_021557; NM_001362269; NM_001362270
RefSeq (protein)	NP_001239579; NP_057110	NP_067532; NP_001349198; NP_001349199
Location (UCSC)	Chr 14: 67.68 – 67.7 Mb	n/a
PubMed search
- Wikidata
View/Edit Human	View/Edit Mouse

Retinol dehydrogenase 11 is an enzyme that in humans is encoded by the RDH11 gene.

RHD11, a member of the short-chain dehydrogenase/reductase (SDR) superfamily of oxidoreductases, is expressed at high levels in prostate epithelium, and its expression is regulated by androgens.[supplied by OMIM]

== Clinical significance ==
Mutations in RDH11 are associated to retinitis pigmentosa.
