= USP22 =

Protein-coding gene in the species Homo sapiens

Identifiers
- Aliases: USP22, USP3L, ubiquitin specific peptidase 22
- External IDs: OMIM: 612116; MGI: 2144157; GeneCards: USP22
Enzyme activity
EC #	BRENDA	ExPASy	KEGG	MetaCyc
3.4.19.12	↗	↗	↗	↗

Gene location (Human)
Chr.	Chromosome 17 (human)
Band	17p11.2	Start	20,999,596 bp
Band	17p11.2	End	21,043,760 bp

Gene location (Mouse)
Chr.	Chromosome 11 (mouse)
Band	11|11 B2	Start	61,042,611 bp
Band	11|11 B2	End	61,065,881 bp
RNA expression pattern
Bgee	Human / Mouse (ortholog); Top expressed in: paraflocculus of cerebellum; ganglionic eminence; middle frontal gyrus; frontal pole; stromal cell of endometrium; Brodmann area 10; ventricular zone; right hemisphere of cerebellum; cingulate gyrus; anterior cingulate cortex / Top expressed in: ganglionic eminence; medial ganglionic eminence; paraventricular nucleus of hypothalamus; arcuate nucleus; dentate gyrus of hippocampal formation granule cell; dorsomedial hypothalamic nucleus; ventromedial nucleus; medial geniculate nucleus; anterior amygdaloid area; subiculum; More reference expression data
BioGPS	n/a
Gene ontology
Molecular function	cysteine-type peptidase activity; transcription coactivator activity; zinc ion binding; H4 histone acetyltransferase activity; metal ion binding; peptidase activity; protein binding; nuclear receptor coactivator activity; thiol-dependent deubiquitinase; enzyme binding; hydrolase activity
Cellular component	SAGA-type complex; SAGA complex; nucleus; nucleoplasm; nuclear speck
Biological process	regulation of transcription, DNA-templated; ubiquitin-dependent protein catabolic process; positive regulation of mitotic cell cycle; transcription, DNA-templated; proteolysis; positive regulation of transcription, DNA-templated; histone deubiquitination; cell cycle; histone ubiquitination; histone H4 acetylation; protein deubiquitination; embryo development ending in birth or egg hatching; chromatin organization
Sources:Amigo / QuickGO
Orthologs
Databases	NCBI: entry; OMA: entry
Species	Human	Mouse
Entrez	23326	216825
Ensembl	ENSG00000124422	ENSMUSG00000042506
UniProt	Q9UPT9	Q5DU02
RefSeq (mRNA)	NM_015276	NM_001004143
RefSeq (protein)	NP_056091	NP_001004143
Location (UCSC)	Chr 17: 21 – 21.04 Mb	Chr 11: 61.04 – 61.07 Mb
PubMed search
- Wikidata
View/Edit Human	View/Edit Mouse

Ubiquitin specific peptidase 22 is a protein that in humans is encoded by the USP22 gene on chromosome 17. USP22 is known to function as a histone deubiquitinating component of the transcription regulatory histone acetylation (HAT) complex SAGA.
