= CBR1 =

Protein found in humans

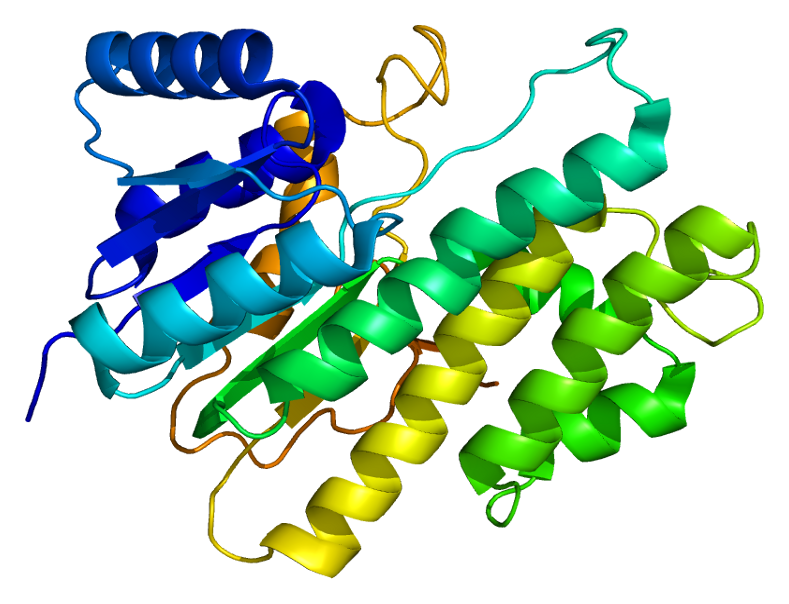

Identifiers
- Aliases: CBR1, CBR, SDR21C1, hcarbonyl reductase 1, PG-9-KR
- External IDs: OMIM: 114830; MGI: 88284; GeneCards: CBR1
Available structures
PDB	Ortholog search: PDBe RCSB
PDB	List of PDB id codes 1WMA, 2PFG, 3BHI, 3BHJ, 3BHM, 4Z3D
Enzyme activity
EC #	BRENDA	ExPASy	KEGG	MetaCyc
1.1.1.71	↗	↗	↗	↗
1.1.1.184	↗	↗	↗	↗
1.1.1.189	↗	↗	↗	↗
1.1.1.196	↗	↗	↗	↗
1.1.1.197	↗	↗	↗	↗

Gene location (Human)
Chr.	Chromosome 21 (human)
Band	21q22.12	Start	36,069,941 bp
Band	21q22.12	End	36,073,166 bp

Gene location (Mouse)
Chr.	Chromosome 16 (mouse)
Band	16 C4|16 54.53 cM	Start	93,402,741 bp
Band	16 C4|16 54.53 cM	End	93,407,393 bp
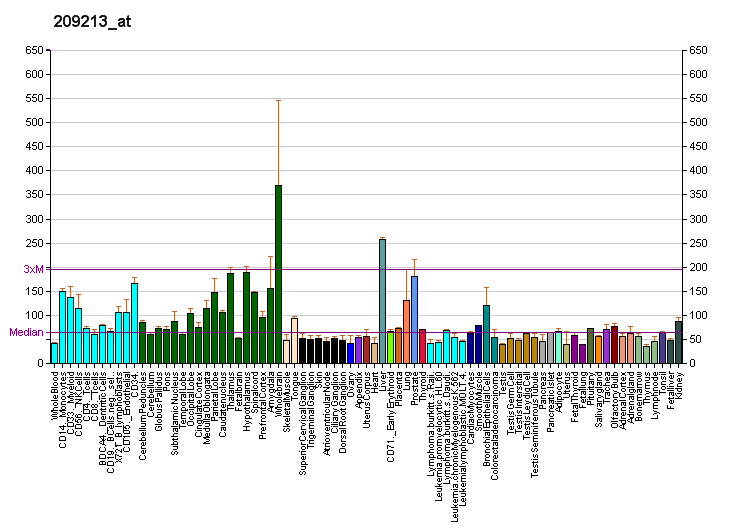
RNA expression pattern
Bgee	Human / Mouse (ortholog); Top expressed in: jejunal mucosa; duodenum; C1 segment; corpus callosum; olfactory zone of nasal mucosa; right adrenal gland; right adrenal cortex; caudate nucleus; mucosa of esophagus; putamen / Top expressed in: epithelium of stomach; superior surface of tongue; duodenum; gallbladder; pyloric antrum; mucous cell of stomach; large intestine; colon; left colon; jejunum; More reference expression data
BioGPS	More reference expression data
Gene ontology
Molecular function	oxidoreductase activity; oxidoreductase activity, acting on NAD(P)H, quinone or similar compound as acceptor; 15-hydroxyprostaglandin dehydrogenase (NADP+) activity; carbonyl reductase (NADPH) activity; prostaglandin-E2 9-reductase activity
Cellular component	cytoplasm; extracellular vesicle; cytosol; extracellular exosome
Biological process	epithelial cell differentiation; vitamin K metabolic process; cyclooxygenase pathway
Sources:Amigo / QuickGO
Orthologs
Databases	NCBI: entry; OMA: entry
Species	Human	Mouse
Entrez	873	12408
Ensembl	ENSG00000159228	ENSMUSG00000051483
UniProt	P16152	P48758
RefSeq (mRNA)	NM_001757; NM_001286789	NM_007620
RefSeq (protein)	NP_001273718; NP_001748	NP_031646
Location (UCSC)	Chr 21: 36.07 – 36.07 Mb	Chr 16: 93.4 – 93.41 Mb
PubMed search
- Wikidata
View/Edit Human	View/Edit Mouse

Carbonyl reductase 1, also known as CBR1, is an enzyme which in humans is encoded by the CBR1 gene. The protein encoded by this gene belongs to the short-chain dehydrogenases/reductases (SDR) family, which function as NADPH-dependent oxidoreductases having wide specificity for carbonyl compounds, such as quinones, prostaglandins, and various xenobiotics. Alternatively spliced transcript variants have been found for this gene.

== Function ==
Carbonyl reductase is one of several monomeric, NADPH-dependent oxidoreductases having wide specificity for carbonyl compounds. This enzyme is widely distributed in human tissues. Another carbonyl reductase gene, CBR3, lies close to this gene on chromosome 21q22.12. CBR1 metabolizes many toxic environmental quinones and pharmacological relevant substrates such as the anticancer doxorubicin. Several studies have shown that CBR1 plays a protective role in oxidative stress, neurodegeneration, and apoptosis. In addition, CBR1 inactivates lipid aldehydes during oxidative stress in cells. Therefore, CBR1 may play a beneficial role in protecting against cellular damage resulting from oxidative stress.

== Polymorphisms ==
Up-to-date two non-synonymous polymorphisms on CBR1 have been identified. The CBR1 V88I polymorphism encodes for a valine-to-isoleucine substitution at position 88 of the aminoacid chain. In vitro studies with recombinant proteins indicate that the CBR1 V88 isoform has a higher Vmax towards the substrates menadione (vitamin K_{3}) and daunorubicin. Recent studies in human liver cytosols show that an untranslated polymorphism on the 3'UTR region of the CBR1 gene (rs9024) is associated with higher levels of the cardiotoxic metabolite doxorubicinol.

== Structure ==
=== Gene ===
Human CBR1 gene includes 3 exons.

=== Protein ===
The enzyme consists of 277 amino acid residues and is widely distributed in human tissues such as liver, epidermis, stomach, small intestine, kidney, neuronal cells, and smooth muscle fibers. The best substrates of CBR1 are quinones, including ubiquinone-1 and tocopherolquinone (vitamin E). Ubiquinones (coenzyme Q) are constitutive parts of the respiratory chain, and tocopherolquinone protects lipids of biological membranes against lipid peroxidation, indicating that CBR1 may play an important role as an oxidation–reduction catalyst in biological processes.

== Clinical significance ==
CBR1 has been reported to relate to tumor progression. Suppression of CBR1 expression was associated with poor prognosis in uterine endometrial cancer and uterine cervical squamous cell carcinoma. Previous studies showed that decreased CBR1 expression is associated with lymph node metastasis and poor prognosis in ovarian cancer, and induction of CBR1 expression in ovarian tumors leads to a spontaneous decrease in tumor size.

Recent study demonstrates that CBR1 attenuates apoptosis and promotes cell survival in pancreatic β cell lines under glucotoxic and glucolipotoxic conditions via reducing ROS generation. Their data demonstrates that CBR1 expression level and enzyme activity are decreased in pancreatic islets isolated from db/db mice, an animal model of type 2 diabetes. These results suggest that CBR1 may play a role in protecting pancreatic β-cells against oxidative stress under glucotoxic or glucolipotoxic conditions, and its reduced expression or activity may contribute to β-cell dysfunction in db/db mice or human type 2 diabetes.

In addition, CBR1 may play a critical role in prostaglandin F_{2α} (PGF_{2α}) synthesis in human amnion fibroblasts, and cortisol promotes the conversion of PGE_{2} into PGF_{2α} via glucocorticoid receptor (GR)-mediated induction of CBR1 in human amnion fibroblasts. This stimulatory effect of cortisol on CBR1 expression may partly explain the concurrent increases of cortisol and PGF_{2α} in human amnion tissue with labor, and these findings may account for the increased production of PGF_{2α} in the fetal membranes prior to the onset of labor.

== Interactions ==
CBR1 has been shown to interact with cortisol, C2 domain, and Flavonoid.
