= 2,3-dihydro-2,3-dihydroxybenzoate dehydrogenase =

InterPro Family

Identifiers
- EC no.: 1.3.1.28
- CAS no.: 37250-40-1

Databases
- IntEnz: IntEnz view
- BRENDA: BRENDA entry
- ExPASy: NiceZyme view
- KEGG: KEGG entry
- MetaCyc: metabolic pathway
- PRIAM: profile
- PDB structures: RCSB PDB PDBe PDBsum
- Gene Ontology: AmiGO / QuickGO
Search
- PMC: articles
- PubMed: articles
- NCBI: proteins

In enzymology, 2,3-dihydro-2,3-dihydroxybenzoate dehydrogenase (EC 1.3.1.28) is an enzyme that catalyzes the chemical reaction

2,3-Dihydroxy-2,3-dihydrobenzoic acid
+ NAD^{+}
H^{+}
H^{+}
2,3-Dihydroxybenzoic acid
+ NADH

The two substrates of this enzyme are (2S,3S)-2,3-dihydroxy-2,3-dihydrobenzoic acid and oxidised nicotinamide adenine dinucleotide (NAD^{+}). Its products are 2,3-dihydroxybenzoic acid, reduced NADH, and a proton.

This enzyme belongs to the family of oxidoreductases, specifically those acting on the CH-CH group of donor with NAD+ or NADP+ as acceptor. The systematic name of this enzyme class is 2,3-dihydro-2,3-dihydroxybenzoate:NAD+ oxidoreductase. This enzyme is also called 2,3-diDHB dehydrogenase. This enzyme participates in biosynthesis of siderophore group nonribosomal.

== Structure ==
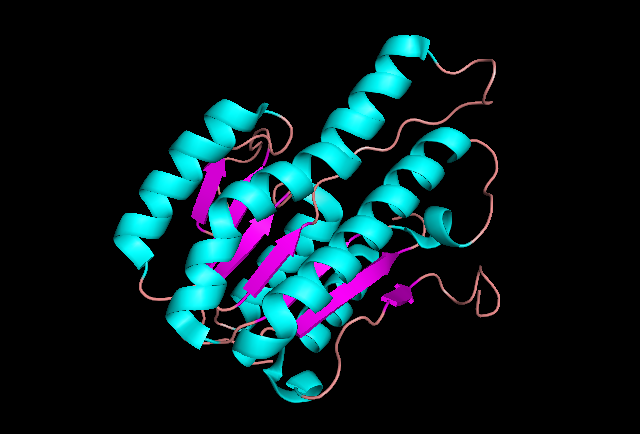
Monomer structure of 2,3-dihydro-2,3-dihydroxybenzoate dehydrogenase.

2,3-diDHB dehydrogenase is a tetramer protein with dimension 65x69x43 Å. It has a crystallographic 222 symmetry, which exhibited for other members of short-chain oxireductase (SCOR) family of enzymes. The length of each monomer is 248 residues and the weight of the protein is 24647 Da. Each monomer consists of 7 beta-pleated sheets and 6 alpha helices.

Although the structure of the binding protein is not clearly defined, it was proposed that the binding pocket is made out of Leu83, Met85, Arg138, Gly140, Met141, Ser176, Met181, Gln182 and Leu185. It was also speculated that Arg138 is a likely subunit that interacts with the carboxyl group of 2,3-diDHB. Since there was a strong indication of oxidation at C3 position, Ser176 and Gln182 interact with the C2-hydroxyl group in order for the stereo-selective reaction to occur.

== Reaction mechanism ==
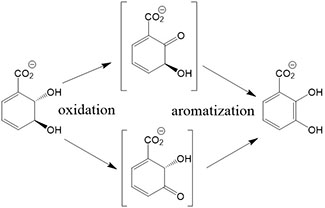
Reaction scheme for 2,3-diDHB dehydrogenase.

In times of limited iron number in the environment, the EntA reaction is irreversible physiologically. The exact mechanism for the reaction is unknown; however, the proposed reaction scheme for the reaction is as following:

== Rate of reaction ==
The rate of the conversion reaction is determined by several factors. The regiochemical position of the carboxyl group and the 3-hydroxyl group plays one role in the reaction, in which the rate of reaction of 1,3-cis-substituted substrate gives about 40-fold higher k_{cat}/K_{m} value than the 1,3-trans-substituted substrate.

== Roles in bacteria ==
=== E. coli ===
2,3-diDHB dehydrogenase catalyzes the NAD^{+}-dependent oxidation of 2,3-dihydro-2,3-dihydroxybenzoate to produce an aromatic compound 2,3-dihydroxybenzoic acid (2,3-DHB or simply DHB). In times of iron deficiency, iron uptake is controlled by three genes: ent, fep, and fes for synthesis, export, and uptake of ferric Enterobactin and its hydrolytic cleavage to release Fe^{3+} into the cell. This production of this compound is controlled by eight genes: entA-entF, entH, and entS. In E. coli, all of these genes are controlled by the Fur repressor, such that the genes are turned on when the concentration of iron in the environment is low. From these six genes, EntA, EntB, and EntC are responsible for the synthesis of DHB from chorismic acid and the gene EntA encodes the information of 2,3-diDHB dehydrogenase. Without entA, entB, and entC, the bacteria show almost an absolute requirement of DHB in order to survive.

=== A. tumefaciens ===
Production of siderophores also exhibited in some plant-infecting bacteria, such as Agrobacterium tumefaciens. The enzyme is controlled by gene cluster agb and the production of 2,3-diDHB dehydrogenase is controlled by the gene agbA. The enzyme AgbA is homologous to the EntA enzyme in E. coli, the same enzyme that produces 2,3-diDHB dehydrogenase.
