= DHRS1 =

Protein-coding gene in the species Homo sapiens

Identifiers
- Aliases: DHRS1, SDR19C1, dehydrogenase/reductase (SDR family) member 1, dehydrogenase/reductase 1
- External IDs: OMIM: 610410; MGI: 1196314; GeneCards: DHRS1
Available structures
PDB	Ortholog search: PDBe RCSB
PDB	List of PDB id codes 2QQ5

Gene location (Human)
Chr.	Chromosome 14 (human)
Band	14q12	Start	24,290,598 bp
Band	14q12	End	24,299,780 bp

Gene location (Mouse)
Chr.	Chromosome 14 (mouse)
Band	14 C3|14 28.19 cM	Start	55,976,477 bp
Band	14 C3|14 28.19 cM	End	55,983,147 bp
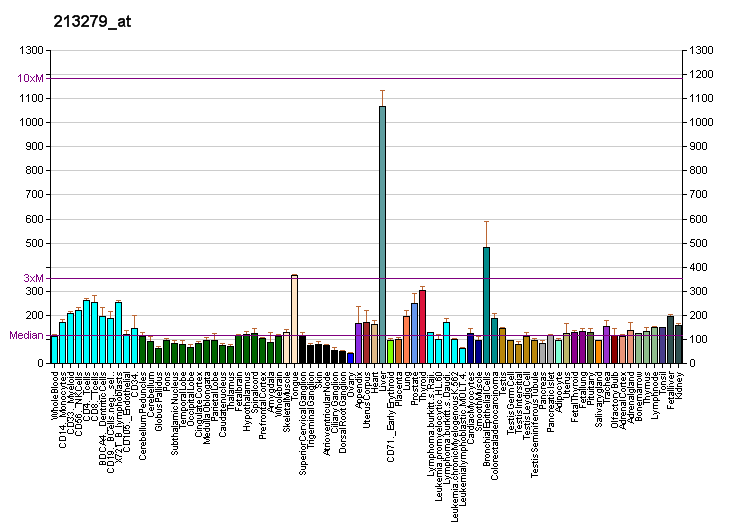
RNA expression pattern
Bgee	Human / Mouse (ortholog); Top expressed in: right lobe of liver; duodenum; skin of leg; skin of abdomen; mucosa of transverse colon; vagina; minor salivary glands; spleen; olfactory zone of nasal mucosa; ectocervix / Top expressed in: ciliary body; duodenum; iris; right kidney; lip; epithelium of small intestine; zygote; granulocyte; left lobe of liver; choroid plexus of fourth ventricle; More reference expression data
BioGPS	More reference expression data
Orthologs
Databases	NCBI: entry; OMA: entry
Species	Human	Mouse
Entrez	115817	52585
Ensembl	ENSG00000157379; ENSG00000284868	ENSMUSG00000002332
UniProt	Q96LJ7	Q99L04
RefSeq (mRNA)	NM_001136050; NM_138452	NM_026819
RefSeq (protein)	NP_001129522; NP_612461	NP_081095
Location (UCSC)	Chr 14: 24.29 – 24.3 Mb	Chr 14: 55.98 – 55.98 Mb
PubMed search
- Wikidata
View/Edit Human	View/Edit Mouse

Dehydrogenase/reductase SDR family member 1, also known as Short chain dehydrogenase/reductase family 19C member 1, is an enzyme that in humans is encoded by the DHRS1 gene located on chromosome 14.

== Structure ==
The DHRS1 gene is located on the chromosome 14q21.3 region and contains 9 exons. It encodes a 314-amino-acid, 33-kDa protein that is thought to be located to the endoplasmic reticulum and the mitochondrial inner membrane inside the cell.

== Function ==
The DHRS1 protein is thought to have oxidoreductase activity based on sequence similarity and conserved catalytic sites with other short-chain oxidoreductase enzymes. The enzyme is found to be expressed in the fetal brain.

== Interactions ==
The DHRS1 protein is thought to interact with the protein phospholipid scrambase 1 (PLSCR1).
