= DHRS3 =

Protein-coding gene in humans

Identifiers
- Aliases: DHRS3, DD83.1, RDH17, Rsdr1, SDR1, SDR16C1, retSDR1, dehydrogenase/reductase (SDR family) member 3, dehydrogenase/reductase 3
- External IDs: OMIM: 612830; MGI: 1315215; GeneCards: DHRS3
Enzyme activity
EC #	BRENDA	ExPASy	KEGG	MetaCyc
1.1.1.300	↗	↗	↗	↗

Gene location (Human)
Chr.	Chromosome 1 (human)
Band	1p36.21	Start	12,567,910 bp
Band	1p36.21	End	12,618,210 bp

Gene location (Mouse)
Chr.	Chromosome 4 (mouse)
Band	4|4 E1	Start	144,619,397 bp
Band	4|4 E1	End	144,654,779 bp
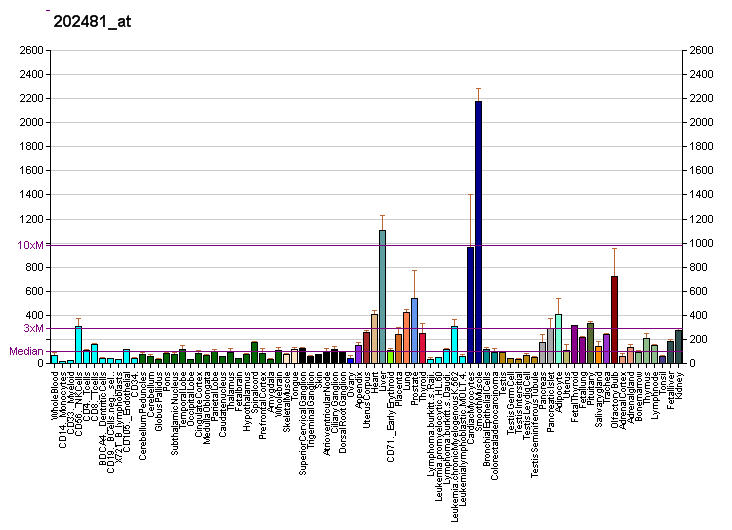
RNA expression pattern
Bgee	Human / Mouse (ortholog); Top expressed in: olfactory bulb; right lobe of liver; tibial nerve; right lobe of thyroid gland; nasal epithelium; left lobe of thyroid gland; prostate; olfactory zone of nasal mucosa; seminal vesicula; subcutaneous adipose tissue / Top expressed in: vestibular membrane of cochlear duct; transitional epithelium of urinary bladder; left lobe of liver; right kidney; neural layer of retina; external carotid artery; proximal tubule; lobe of prostate; epithelium of stomach; right lung lobe; More reference expression data
BioGPS	More reference expression data
Gene ontology
Molecular function	electron transfer activity; nucleotide binding; oxidoreductase activity; NAD-retinol dehydrogenase activity; NADP-retinol dehydrogenase activity
Cellular component	photoreceptor outer segment membrane; integral component of membrane; endoplasmic reticulum membrane; membrane; lipid droplet
Biological process	negative regulation of retinoic acid receptor signaling pathway; retinol metabolic process; roof of mouth development; bone morphogenesis; outflow tract morphogenesis; regulation of ossification; visual perception; retinoid metabolic process; cardiac septum morphogenesis; electron transport chain; regulation of retinoic acid receptor signaling pathway
Sources:Amigo / QuickGO
Orthologs
Databases	NCBI: entry; OMA: entry
Species	Human	Mouse
Entrez	9249	20148
Ensembl	ENSG00000162496	ENSMUSG00000066026
UniProt	O75911; Q5SUY4	O88876
RefSeq (mRNA)	NM_004753; NM_001319225; NM_001324370	NM_001172424; NM_011303; NM_001357274; NM_001357275; NM_001357276 NM_001357277
RefSeq (protein)	NP_001306154; NP_001311299; NP_004744	NP_001165895; NP_035433; NP_001344203; NP_001344204; NP_001344205 NP_001344206
Location (UCSC)	Chr 1: 12.57 – 12.62 Mb	Chr 4: 144.62 – 144.65 Mb
PubMed search
- Wikidata
View/Edit Human	View/Edit Mouse

Short-chain dehydrogenase/reductase 3 is an enzyme that in humans is encoded by the DHRS3 gene.
