= CBR3 =

Protein-coding gene in humans

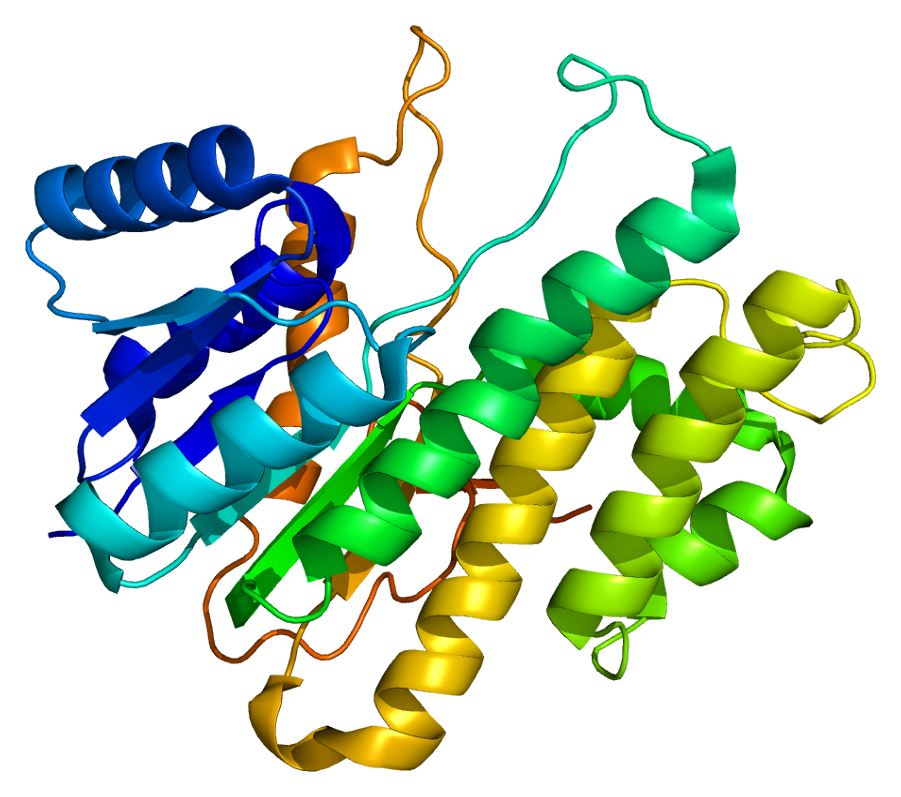

Identifiers
- Aliases: CBR3, HEL-S-25, SDR21C2, hcarbonyl reductase 3
- External IDs: OMIM: 603608; MGI: 1309992; GeneCards: CBR3
Available structures
PDB	Ortholog search: PDBe RCSB
PDB	List of PDB id codes 2HRB
Enzyme activity
EC #	BRENDA	ExPASy	KEGG	MetaCyc
1.1.1.184	↗	↗	↗	↗
1.6.5.10	↗	↗	↗	↗

Gene location (Human)
Chr.	Chromosome 21 (human)
Band	21q22.12	Start	36,135,079 bp
Band	21q22.12	End	36,146,562 bp

Gene location (Mouse)
Chr.	Chromosome 16 (mouse)
Band	16 C4|16 54.58 cM	Start	93,480,103 bp
Band	16 C4|16 54.58 cM	End	93,487,878 bp
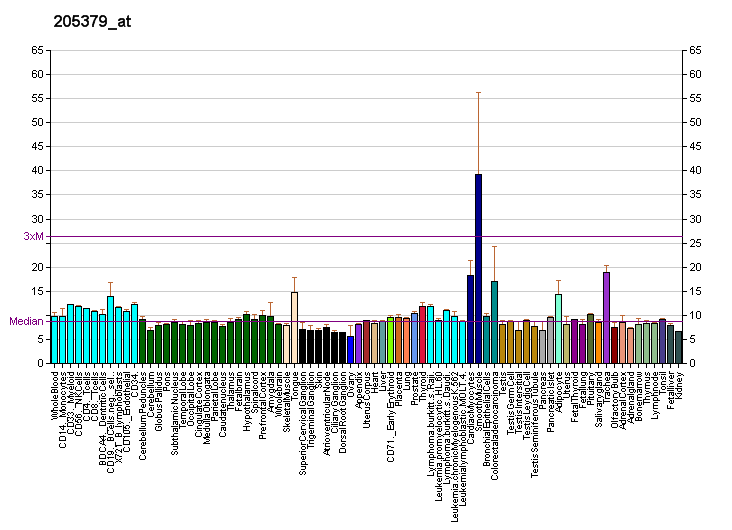
RNA expression pattern
Bgee	Human / Mouse (ortholog); Top expressed in: gingival epithelium; tendon of biceps brachii; olfactory zone of nasal mucosa; parotid gland; cartilage tissue; minor salivary glands; vulva; oral cavity; mucosa of pharynx; Achilles tendon / Top expressed in: epithelium of stomach; pyloric antrum; mucous cell of stomach; cervix; esophagus; stroma of bone marrow; skin of external ear; ankle joint; lip; dorsal striatum; More reference expression data
BioGPS	More reference expression data
Gene ontology
Molecular function	oxidoreductase activity; NADPH binding; carbonyl reductase (NADPH) activity; 3-keto sterol reductase activity; protein binding
Cellular component	nucleoplasm; extracellular space; cytoplasm; cytosol
Biological process	phylloquinone catabolic process; cognition; xenobiotic metabolic process
Sources:Amigo / QuickGO
Orthologs
Databases	NCBI: entry; OMA: entry
Species	Human	Mouse
Entrez	874	109857
Ensembl	ENSG00000159231	ENSMUSG00000022947
UniProt	O75828	Q8K354
RefSeq (mRNA)	NM_001236	NM_173047
RefSeq (protein)	NP_001227	NP_766635
Location (UCSC)	Chr 21: 36.14 – 36.15 Mb	Chr 16: 93.48 – 93.49 Mb
PubMed search
- Wikidata
View/Edit Human	View/Edit Mouse

Carbonyl reductase [NADPH] 3 is an enzyme that in humans is encoded by the CBR3 gene. The enzyme is a member of short chain dehydrogenase/reductase superfamily (SDR).

Carbonyl reductase 3 catalyzes the reduction of a large number of biologically and pharmacologically active carbonyl compounds to their corresponding alcohols. The enzyme is classified as a monomeric NADPH-dependent oxidoreductase. CBR3 contains three exons spanning 11.2 kilobases and is closely linked to another carbonyl reductase gene - CBR1.

== See also ==
- Carbonyl reductase (NADPH)
- Dehydrogenase
