= DHRS7 =

Protein-coding gene in the species Homo sapiens

Identifiers
- Aliases: DHRS7, SDR34C1, retDSR4, retSDR4, CGI-86, dehydrogenase/reductase (SDR family) member 7, dehydrogenase/reductase 7
- External IDs: OMIM: 612833; MGI: 1913625; GeneCards: DHRS7

Gene location (Human)
| Chr. | Chromosome 14 (human) |
| Band | 14q23.1 | Start | 60,144,119 bp |
| Band | 14q23.1 | End | 60,169,856 bp |

Gene location (Mouse)
| Chr. | Chromosome 12 (mouse) |
| Band | 12|12 C3 | Start | 72,697,127 bp |
| Band | 12|12 C3 | End | 72,711,683 bp |
RNA expression pattern
| Bgee | Human / Mouse (ortholog); Top expressed in: parotid gland; gastrocnemius muscle; Achilles tendon; muscle of thigh; left adrenal gland; blood; granulocyte; Descending thoracic aorta; seminal vesicula; glutes / Top expressed in: granulocyte; lacrimal gland; skin of external ear; parotid gland; brown adipose tissue; lip; adrenal gland; Ileal epithelium; cardiac muscle tissue of left ventricle; seminal vesicula; More reference expression data |
| BioGPS | n/a |
Orthologs
| Databases | NCBI: entry; OMA: entry |
| Species | Human | Mouse |
| Entrez | 51635 | 66375 |
| Ensembl | ENSG00000100612 | ENSMUSG00000021094 |
| UniProt | Q9Y394 | Q9CXR1 |
| RefSeq (mRNA) | NM_016029; NM_001322280; NM_001322281; NM_001322282 | NM_025522 |
| RefSeq (protein) | NP_001309209; NP_001309210; NP_001309211; NP_057113 | NP_079798 |
| Location (UCSC) | Chr 14: 60.14 – 60.17 Mb | Chr 12: 72.7 – 72.71 Mb |
| PubMed search |
- Wikidata
| View/Edit Human | View/Edit Mouse |

Dehydrogenase/reductase (SDR family) member 7 is a protein that in humans is encoded by the DHRS7 gene.

== Function ==
Short-chain dehydrogenases/reductases (SDRs), such as DHRS7, catalyze the oxidation/reduction of a wide range of substrates, including retinoids and steroids.
