= RDH13 =

Protein-coding gene in humans

Identifiers
- Aliases: RDH13, SDR7C3, retinol dehydrogenase 13 (all-trans/9-cis), retinol dehydrogenase 13
- External IDs: MGI: 1918732; GeneCards: RDH13
Enzyme activity
EC #	BRENDA	ExPASy	KEGG	MetaCyc
1.1.1.300	↗	↗	↗	↗

Gene location (Human)
Chr.	Chromosome 19 (human)
Band	19q13.42	Start	55,039,108 bp
Band	19q13.42	End	55,071,291 bp

Gene location (Mouse)
Chr.	Chromosome 7 (mouse)
Band	7|7 A1	Start	4,424,770 bp
Band	7|7 A1	End	4,445,649 bp
RNA expression pattern
Bgee	Human / Mouse (ortholog); Top expressed in: skin of leg; skin of abdomen; mucosa of transverse colon; apex of heart; placenta; minor salivary glands; left ventricle; vagina; body of stomach; right lobe of thyroid gland / Top expressed in: otic vesicle; saccule; otic placode; medullary collecting duct; gastric mucosa; cardiac muscle tissue of left ventricle; superior frontal gyrus; mucous cell of stomach; epithelium of stomach; primary visual cortex; More reference expression data
BioGPS	n/a
Gene ontology
Molecular function	NADP-retinol dehydrogenase activity; oxidoreductase activity
Cellular component	mitochondrial inner membrane; mitochondrion; membrane
Biological process	response to high light intensity; retina layer formation; eye photoreceptor cell development; retinol metabolic process; retinal metabolic process
Sources:Amigo / QuickGO
Orthologs
Databases	NCBI: entry; OMA: entry
Species	Human	Mouse
Entrez	112724	108841
Ensembl	ENSG00000278284; ENSG00000274418; ENSG00000276341; ENSG00000275474; ENSG00000274504 ENSG00000273944; ENSG00000276684; ENSG00000278149; ENSG00000276826; ENSG00000160439	ENSMUSG00000008435
UniProt	Q8NBN7	Q8CEE7
RefSeq (mRNA)	NM_001145971; NM_138412	NM_001290409; NM_001290411; NM_175372
RefSeq (protein)	NP_001139443; NP_612421	NP_001277338; NP_001277340; NP_780581
Location (UCSC)	Chr 19: 55.04 – 55.07 Mb	Chr 7: 4.42 – 4.45 Mb
PubMed search
- Wikidata
View/Edit Human	View/Edit Mouse

Retinol dehydrogenase 13 (all-trans/9-cis) is a protein that in humans is encoded by the RDH13 gene. This gene encodes a mitochondrial short-chain dehydrogenase/reductase, which catalyzes the reduction and oxidation of retinoids. The encoded enzyme may function in retinoic acid production and may also protect the mitochondria against oxidative stress. Alternatively spliced transcript variants have been described.

== Gene ==
The human RDH13 gene is on the 19th chromosome, with its specific localization being 19q13.42. The gene contains 12 exons in total.

== Structure ==
The analysis of the submitochondrial localization of RDH13 indicates its association with the inner mitochondrial membrane. The primary structure of RDH13 contains two hydrophobic segments, 2–21 and 242–261, which are sufficiently long to serve as transmembrane segments; however, as shown in the present study, alkaline extraction completely removes the protein from the membrane, indicating that RDH13 is a peripheral membrane protein. The peripheral association of RDH13 with the membrane further distinguishes this protein from the microsomal retinaldehyde reductases, which are integral membrane proteins that appear to be anchored in the membrane via their N-terminal hydrophobic segments.

== Function ==
RDH13 is most closely related to the NADP+-dependent microsomal enzymes RDH11, RDH12 and RDH14. Purified RDH13 acts on retinoids in an oxidative reductive manner, and strongly prefers the cofactor NADPH over NADH. Moreover, RDH13 is much has much more efficient reductase activity than dehydrogenase activity. RDH13 as a retinaldehyde reductase is significantly less active than that of a related protein RDH11, primarily because of the much higher Km value for retinaldehyde. However, the kcat value of RDH13 for retinaldehyde reduction. arable with that of RDH11, and the Km values of the two enzymes for NADPH are also very similar. Thus, consistent with its sequence similarity to RDH11, RDH12 and RDH14, RDH13 acts as an NADP+-dependent retinaldehyde reductase.

RDH13 is localized in the mitochondria, which is different from the other members of this family, as they localize to the endoplasmic reticulum. The exact sequence targeting RDH13 to the mitochondria remains to be established.

== Clinical significance ==
RDH13 is part of a subfamily of four retinol dehydrogenases, RDH11, RDH12, RDH13, and RDH14, that display dual-substrate specificity, uniquely metabolizing all-trans- and cis-retinols with C(15) pro-R specificity. The metabolites involved in these reactions are known as retinoids, which are chromophores involved in vision, transcriptional regulation, and cellular differentiation. RDH11-14 could be involved in the first step of all-trans- and 9-cis-retinoic acid production in many tissues. RDH11-14 fill the gap in our understanding of 11-cis-retinal and all-trans-retinal transformations in photoreceptor and retinal pigment epithelial cells. The dual-substrate specificity of this subfamily explains the minor phenotype associated with mutations in 11-cis-retinol dehydrogenase (RDH5) causing fundus albipunctatus in humans.
