= RDH14 =

Protein-coding gene in humans

Identifiers
- Aliases: RDH14, PAN2, SDR7C4, retinol dehydrogenase 14 (all-trans/9-cis/11-cis), retinol dehydrogenase 14
- External IDs: OMIM: 616796; MGI: 1920402; GeneCards: RDH14
Enzyme activity
EC #	BRENDA	ExPASy	KEGG	MetaCyc
1.1.1.300	↗	↗	↗	↗

Gene location (Human)
Chr.	Chromosome 2 (human)
Band	2p24.2	Start	18,554,723 bp
Band	2p24.2	End	18,560,679 bp

Gene location (Mouse)
Chr.	Chromosome 12 (mouse)
Band	12|12 A1.1	Start	10,440,772 bp
Band	12|12 A1.1	End	10,445,562 bp
RNA expression pattern
Bgee	Human / Mouse (ortholog); Top expressed in: left ventricle; islet of Langerhans; right auricle of heart; gastrocnemius muscle; skeletal muscle tissue; Achilles tendon; smooth muscle tissue; muscle of thigh; thoracic aorta; ascending aorta / Top expressed in: interventricular septum; sternocleidomastoid muscle; masseter muscle; digastric muscle; triceps brachii muscle; temporal muscle; intercostal muscle; epithelium of lens; extraocular muscle; vastus lateralis muscle; More reference expression data
BioGPS	n/a
Gene ontology
Molecular function	alcohol dehydrogenase (NADP+) activity; oxidoreductase activity; NADP-retinol dehydrogenase activity; steroid dehydrogenase activity
Cellular component	lysosomal membrane; endoplasmic reticulum; mitochondrion; nucleus; endoplasmic reticulum membrane; membrane
Biological process	retinol metabolic process; osteoblast differentiation
Sources:Amigo / QuickGO
Orthologs
Databases	NCBI: entry; OMA: entry
Species	Human	Mouse
Entrez	57665	105014
Ensembl	ENSG00000240857	ENSMUSG00000020621
UniProt	Q9HBH5	Q9ERI6
RefSeq (mRNA)	NM_020905	NM_023697
RefSeq (protein)	NP_065956	NP_076186
Location (UCSC)	Chr 2: 18.55 – 18.56 Mb	Chr 12: 10.44 – 10.45 Mb
PubMed search
- Wikidata
View/Edit Human	View/Edit Mouse

Retinol dehydrogenase 14 is an enzyme that in humans is encoded by the RDH14 gene.
