= RDH5 =

Protein-coding gene in humans

Identifiers
- Aliases: RDH5, 9cRDH, HSD17B9, RDH1, SDR9C5, retinol dehydrogenase 5
- External IDs: OMIM: 601617; MGI: 1201412; GeneCards: RDH5
Enzyme activity
EC #	BRENDA	ExPASy	KEGG	MetaCyc
1.1.1.53	↗	↗	↗	↗
1.1.1.209	↗	↗	↗	↗
1.1.1.315	↗	↗	↗	↗

Gene location (Human)
Chr.	Chromosome 12 (human)
Band	12q13.2	Start	55,720,367 bp
Band	12q13.2	End	55,724,705 bp

Gene location (Mouse)
Chr.	Chromosome 10 (mouse)
Band	10 D3|10 77.19 cM	Start	128,749,462 bp
Band	10 D3|10 77.19 cM	End	128,758,757 bp
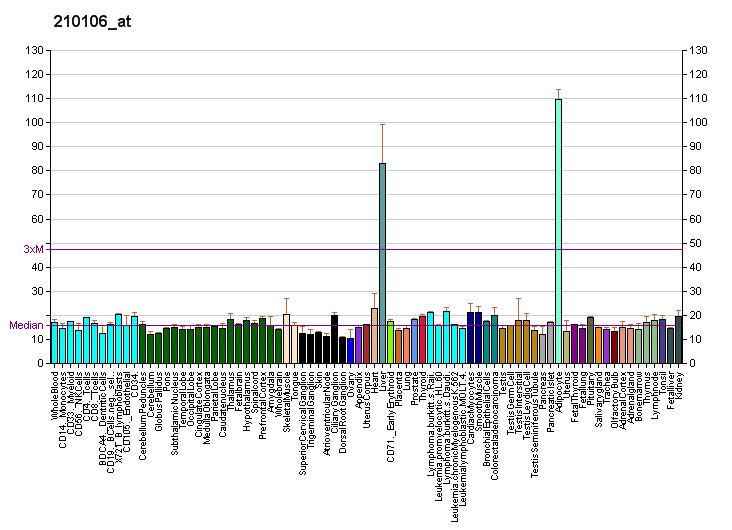
RNA expression pattern
Bgee	Human / Mouse (ortholog); Top expressed in: subcutaneous adipose tissue; right lobe of liver; mucosa of transverse colon; right auricle of heart; duodenum; muscle layer of sigmoid colon; left coronary artery; left ventricle; lactiferous gland; muscle of thigh / Top expressed in: choroid plexus of fourth ventricle; retinal pigment epithelium; Epithelium of choroid plexus; right kidney; lateral ventricle; choroid plexus of lateral ventricle; dentate gyrus of hippocampal formation granule cell; proximal tubule; granulocyte; choroid; More reference expression data
BioGPS	More reference expression data
Gene ontology
Molecular function	oxidoreductase activity; NAD-retinol dehydrogenase activity; protein homodimerization activity; androsterone dehydrogenase activity; androstan-3-alpha,17-beta-diol dehydrogenase activity
Cellular component	cell body; endoplasmic reticulum lumen; endoplasmic reticulum membrane; endoplasmic reticulum; membrane; integral component of membrane
Biological process	retinol metabolic process; visual perception; retinoid metabolic process; response to stimulus; steroid metabolic process; lipid metabolism
Sources:Amigo / QuickGO
Orthologs
Databases	NCBI: entry; OMA: entry
Species	Human	Mouse
Entrez	5959	19682
Ensembl	ENSG00000135437	ENSMUSG00000025350
UniProt	Q92781	O55240
RefSeq (mRNA)	NM_002905; NM_001199771	NM_134006; NM_001358527
RefSeq (protein)	NP_001186700; NP_002896	NP_598767; NP_001345456
Location (UCSC)	Chr 12: 55.72 – 55.72 Mb	Chr 10: 128.75 – 128.76 Mb
PubMed search
- Wikidata
View/Edit Human	View/Edit Mouse

11-cis retinol dehydrogenase is an enzyme that in humans is encoded by the RDH5 gene.
