= PECR =

Protein-coding gene in the species Homo sapiens

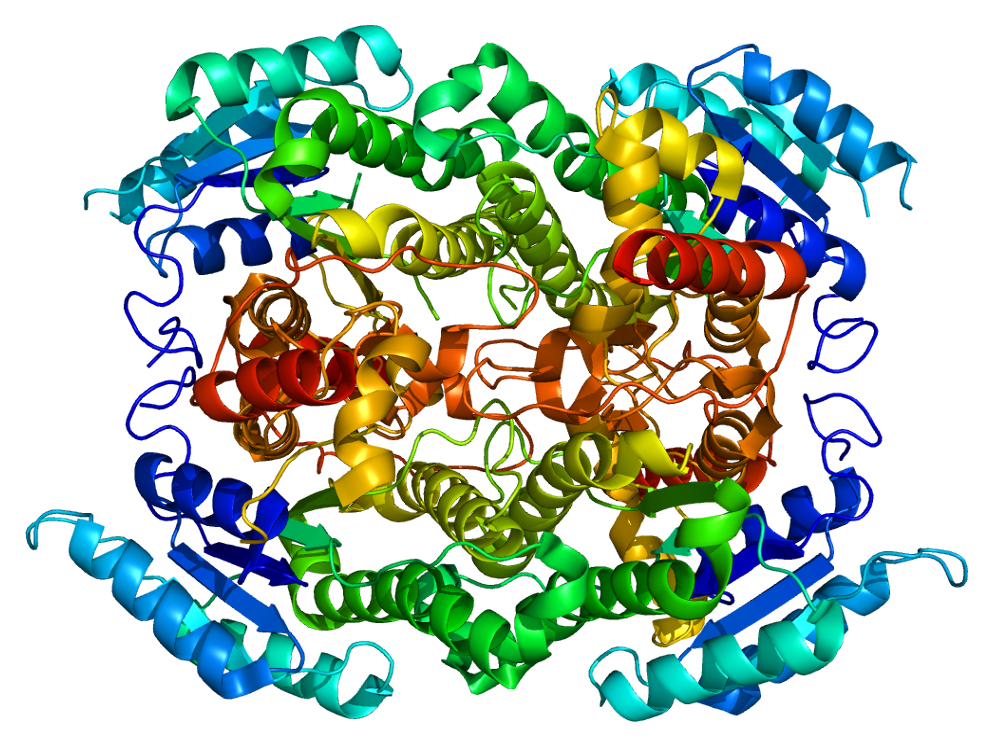

Identifiers
- Aliases: PECR, DCRRP, HPDHASE, HSA250303, PVIARL, SDR29C1, TERP, peroxisomal trans-2-enoyl-CoA reductase
- External IDs: OMIM: 605843; MGI: 2148199; GeneCards: PECR
Available structures
PDB	Ortholog search: PDBe RCSB
PDB	List of PDB id codes 1YXM
Enzyme activity
EC #	BRENDA	ExPASy	KEGG	MetaCyc
1.3.1.38	↗	↗	↗	↗

Gene location (Human)
Chr.	Chromosome 2 (human)
Band	2q35	Start	215,996,329 bp
Band	2q35	End	216,082,955 bp

Gene location (Mouse)
Chr.	Chromosome 1 (mouse)
Band	1 C3|1 36.46 cM	Start	72,298,326 bp
Band	1 C3|1 36.46 cM	End	72,323,473 bp
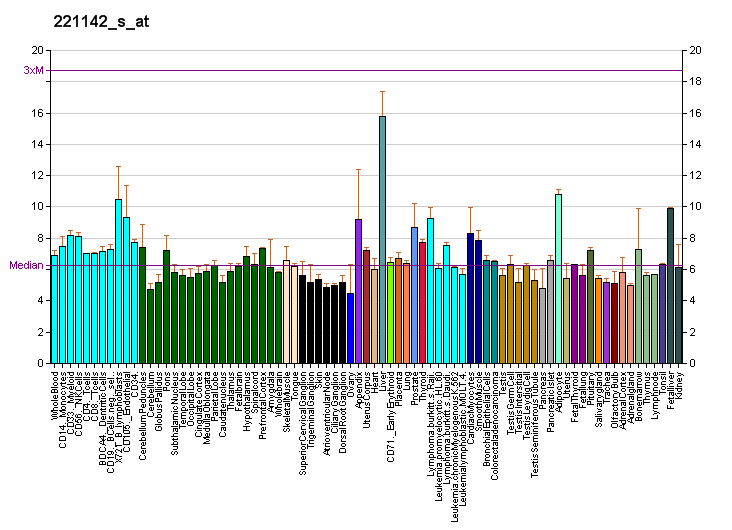
RNA expression pattern
Bgee	Human / Mouse (ortholog); Top expressed in: renal medulla; buccal mucosa cell; nipple; ventral tegmental area; synovial joint; cardia; trigeminal ganglion; subthalamic nucleus; external globus pallidus; spinal ganglia / Top expressed in: right kidney; human kidney; left lobe of liver; zygote; primary oocyte; proximal tubule; secondary oocyte; lacrimal gland; parotid gland; epithelium of small intestine; More reference expression data
BioGPS	More reference expression data
Gene ontology
Molecular function	oxidoreductase activity; signaling receptor binding; 2,4-dienoyl-CoA reductase (NADPH) activity; trans-2-enoyl-CoA reductase (NADPH) activity
Cellular component	peroxisome; mitochondrion; peroxisomal membrane; cytosol
Biological process	phytol metabolic process; fatty acid biosynthetic process; fatty acid metabolic process; lipid metabolism; fatty acid alpha-oxidation; protein targeting to peroxisome
Sources:Amigo / QuickGO
Orthologs
Databases	NCBI: entry; OMA: entry
Species	Human	Mouse
Entrez	55825	111175
Ensembl	ENSG00000115425	ENSMUSG00000026189
UniProt	Q9BY49	Q99MZ7
RefSeq (mRNA)	NM_018441	NM_023523; NM_001356516
RefSeq (protein)	NP_060911	NP_076012; NP_001343445
Location (UCSC)	Chr 2: 216 – 216.08 Mb	Chr 1: 72.3 – 72.32 Mb
PubMed search
- Wikidata
View/Edit Human	View/Edit Mouse

Peroxisomal trans-2-enoyl-CoA reductase is an enzyme that in humans is encoded by the PECR gene. Research suggests that the (human) enzyme participates in the conversion of phytol to phytanic acid in the peroxisomes, which is part of the process of breaking down phytol. In particular, it catalyzes reactions of the form:

a (2E)-enoyl-CoA + NADPH + H^{+} $\rightleftharpoons$ a 2,3-saturated acyl-CoA + NADP^{+}

With affinity for trans-2-enoyl-CoAs of lengths between 4:1 and 16:1.

== See Also ==
- MECR
