= 2-Methyl-3-hydroxybutyryl-CoA =

Names
- IUPAC name S-[2-[3-[[4-[[[(2R,3S,4R,5R)-5-(6-aminopurin-9-yl)-4-hydroxy-3-phosphonooxyoxolan-2-yl]methoxy-hydroxyphosphoryl]oxy-hydroxyphosphoryl]oxy-2-hydroxy-3,3-dimethylbutanoyl]amino]propanoylamino]ethyl] (2S,3S)-3-hydroxy-2-methylbutanethioate

Identifiers
3D model (JSmol)	Interactive image
ChEBI	CHEBI:165613
ChemSpider	389295
KEGG	C04405
PubChem CID	440326
- InChI: InChI=1S/C26H44N7O18P3S/c1-13(14(2)34)25(39)55-8-7-28-16(35)5-6-29-23(38)20(37)26(3,4)10-48-54(45,46)51-53(43,44)47-9-15-19(50-52(40,41)42)18(36)24(49-15)33-12-32-17-21(27)30-11-31-22(17)33/h11-15,18-20,24,34,36-37H,5-10H2,1-4H3,(H,28,35)(H,29,38)(H,43,44)(H,45,46)(H2,27,30,31)(H2,40,41,42)/t13-,14-,15+,18+,19+,20?,24+/m0/s1 Key: PEKYNTFSOBAABV-SYASONGASA-N
- SMILES: C[C@@H]([C@H](C)O)C(=O)SCCNC(=O)CCNC(=O)C(C(C)(C)COP(=O)(O)OP(=O)(O)OC[C@@H]1[C@H]([C@H]([C@@H](O1)N2C=NC3=C(N=CN=C32)N)O)OP(=O)(O)O)O

Properties
Chemical formula	C_{26}H_{44}N_{7}O_{18}P_{3}S
Molar mass	867.7 g/mol
- Except where otherwise noted, data are given for materials in their standard state (at 25 °C [77 °F], 100 kPa). Infobox references

2-Methyl-3-hydroxybutyryl-CoA (2M3HBA) is an intermediate in isoleucine catabolism.

It is a substrate for the enzyme 3-hydroxy-2-methylbutyryl-CoA dehydrogenase (EC 1.1.1.178) which converts it to 2-methylacetoacetyl-CoA:

2-methyl-3-hydroxybutyryl-CoA
+ NAD^{+}
H^{+}
H^{+}
2-methylacetoacetyl-CoA
+ NADH
