= 3-hydroxy-2-methylbutyryl-CoA dehydrogenase =

Class of enzymes

Identifiers
- EC no.: 1.1.1.178
- CAS no.: 52227-66-4

Databases
- IntEnz: IntEnz view
- BRENDA: BRENDA entry
- ExPASy: NiceZyme view
- KEGG: KEGG entry
- MetaCyc: metabolic pathway
- PRIAM: profile
- PDB structures: RCSB PDB PDBe PDBsum
- Gene Ontology: AmiGO / QuickGO
Search
- PMC: articles
- PubMed: articles
- NCBI: proteins

In enzymology, 3-hydroxy-2-methylbutyryl-CoA dehydrogenase (EC 1.1.1.178) is an enzyme that catalyzes the chemical reaction

2-methyl-3-hydroxybutyryl-CoA
+ NAD^{+}
H^{+}
H^{+}
2-methylacetoacetyl-CoA
+ NADH

The two substrates of this enzyme are (2S,3S)-2-methyl-3-hydroxybutyryrl-CoA and oxidised nicotinamide adenine dinucleotide (NAD^{+}). Its products are 2-methylacetoacetyl-CoA, reduced NADH, and a proton.

This enzyme belongs to the family of oxidoreductases, specifically those acting on the CH-OH group of donor with NAD^{+} or NADP^{+} as acceptor. The systematic name of this enzyme class is (2S,3S)-3-hydroxy-2-methylbutanoyl-CoA:NAD^{+} oxidoreductase. Other names in common use include 2-methyl-3-hydroxybutyryl coenzyme A dehydrogenase, 2-methyl-3-hydroxybutyryl coenzyme A dehydrogenase, and 2-methyl-3-hydroxy-butyryl CoA dehydrogenase. This enzyme participates in valine, leucine and isoleucine degradation.

== Structural studies ==
As of 20 January 2010, 6 structure have been solved for this class of enzymes, with the PDB accession code 1E3S, 1E3W, 1E6W, 1SO8, 1U7T, 2O23.
