= 2-Methylacetoacetyl-CoA =

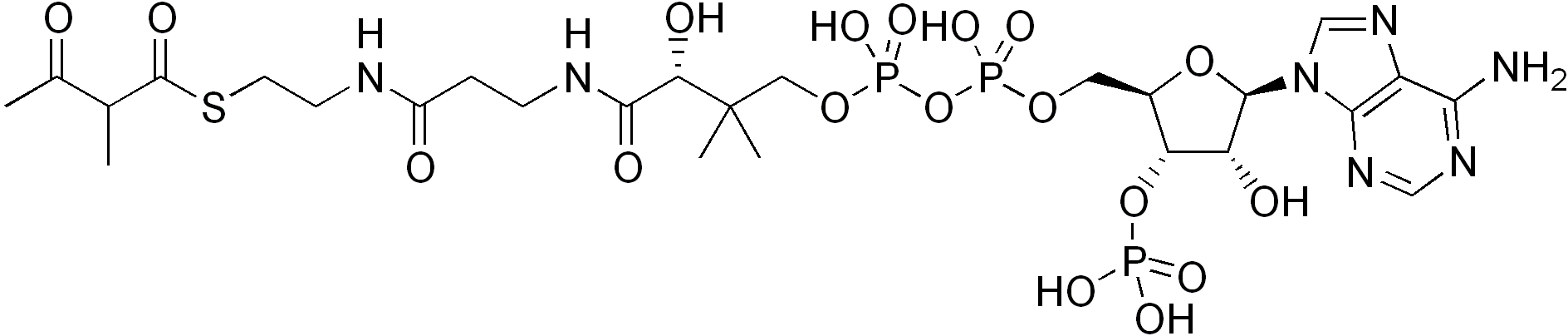

Names
- IUPAC name 3′-O-Phosphonoadenosine 5′-[(3R)-3-hydroxy-2,2-dimethyl-4-({3-[(2-{[(2Ξ)-2-methyl-3-oxobutanoyl]sulfanyl}ethyl)amino]-3-oxopropyl}amino)-4-oxobutyl dihydrogen diphosphate]
- Systematic IUPAC name O^{1}-{[(2R,3S,4R,5R)-5-(6-Amino-9H-purin-9-yl)-4-hydroxy-3-(phosphonooxy)oxolan-2-yl]methyl} O^{3}-[(3R)-3-hydroxy-2,2-dimethyl-4-({3-[(2-{[(2Ξ)-2-methyl-3-oxobutanoyl]sulfanyl}ethyl)amino]-3-oxopropyl}amino)-4-oxobutyl] dihydrogen diphosphate

Identifiers
| CAS Number | 6712-01-2 |
| 3D model (JSmol) | Interactive image |
| ChemSpider | 17216071 |
| MeSH | 2-methylacetoacetyl-coenzyme+A |
| PubChem CID | 53 |
| CompTox Dashboard (EPA) | DTXSID70986160 |
- InChI: InChI=1S/C26H42N7O18P3S/c1-13(14(2)34)25(39)55-8-7-28-16(35)5-6-29-23(38)20(37)26(3,4)10-48-54(45,46)51-53(43,44)47-9-15-19(50-52(40,41)42)18(36)24(49-15)33-12-32-17-21(27)30-11-31-22(17)33/h11-13,15,18-20,24,36-37H,5-10H2,1-4H3,(H,28,35)(H,29,38)(H,43,44)(H,45,46)(H2,27,30,31)(H2,40,41,42)/t13?,15-,18-,19-,20-,24-/m1/s1 Key: NHNODHRSCRALBF-JGCWONBBSA-N; InChI=1/C26H42N7O18P3S/c1-13(14(2)34)25(39)55-8-7-28-16(35)5-6-29-23(38)20(37)26(3,4)10-48-54(45,46)51-53(43,44)47-9-15-19(50-52(40,41)42)18(36)24(49-15)33-12-32-17-21(27)30-11-31-22(17)33/h11-13,15,18-20,24,36-37H,5-10H2,1-4H3,(H,28,35)(H,29,38)(H,43,44)(H,45,46)(H2,27,30,31)(H2,40,41,42)/t13?,15-,18-,19-,20-,24-/m1/s1 Key: NHNODHRSCRALBF-JGCWONBBBK
- SMILES: CC(=O)[C@H](C)C(=O)SCCNC(=O)CCNC(=O)[C@@H](O)C(C)(C)COP(O)(=O)OP(O)(=O)OC[C@H]3O[C@@H](n2cnc1c(N)ncnc12)[C@H](O)[C@@H]3OP(O)(O)=O

Properties
| Chemical formula | C_{26}H_{42}N_{7}O_{18}P_{3}S |
| Molar mass | 865.63 g/mol |
- Except where otherwise noted, data are given for materials in their standard state (at 25 °C [77 °F], 100 kPa). verify (what is ?) Infobox references

2-Methylacetoacetyl-CoA is an intermediate in the metabolism of isoleucine. It was first synthesized n 1983. There is an extremely rare metabolic disorder, which involves humans who can't produce the enzyme that metabolizes the chemical into isoleucine; an emergency infusion of electrolytes and long-term a low-protein diet resolves the symptoms. This condition is similar to Phenylketonuria.

== See also ==
- 3-hydroxy-2-methylbutyryl-CoA dehydrogenase
