= PEDOT-TMA =

Chemical compound

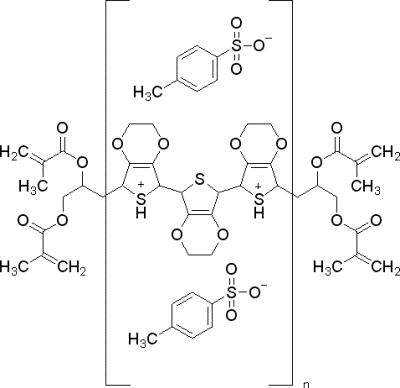

Names
- Other names Oligotron; Pedot tetramethacrylate; Poly(3,4-ethylenedioxythiophene), tetramethacrylate end-capped, PEDOT-TM, Meth-Pedot, Pedot-Meth

Identifiers

Properties
| Molar mass | ~6000 g/mol |
- Except where otherwise noted, data are given for materials in their standard state (at 25 °C [77 °F], 100 kPa). verify (what is ?) Infobox references

Poly(3,4-ethylenedioxythiophene)-tetramethacrylate or PEDOT-TMA is a p-type conducting polymer based on 3,4-ethylenedioxylthiophene or the EDOT monomer. It is a modification of the PEDOT structure. Advantages of this polymer relative to PEDOT (or PEDOT:PSS) are that it is dispersible in organic solvents, and it is non-corrosive. PEDOT-TMA was developed under a contract with the National Science Foundation, and it was first announced publicly on April 12, 2004. The trade name for PEDOT-TMA is Oligotron. PEDOT-TMA was featured in an article entitled "Next Stretch for Plastic Electronics" that appeared in Scientific American in 2004. The U.S. Patent office issued a patent protecting PEDOT-TMA on April 22, 2008.

PEDOT-TMA differs from the parent polymer PEDOT in that it is capped on both ends of the polymer. This limits the chain-length of the polymer, making it more soluble in organic solvents than PEDOT. The methacrylate groups on the two end-caps allow further chemistry to occur such as cross-linking to other polymers or materials.

== Physical properties ==
The bulk conductivity of PEDOT-TMA is 0.1-.5 S/cm, the sheet resistance 1-10 M Ω/sq, and the methacrylate equivalent weight 1360-1600 g/mol. The chemical composition of a film of PEDOT-TMA was measured by energy-dispersive x-ray spectroscopy (EDS). The relative C, O, and S weight percentages were 51.28%, 35.37%, and 10.43%. There was also 2.92% Fe present in the film.

== Applications ==
Several devices and materials have been described in both journals and the patent literature that use PEDOT-TMA as a critical component. In this section, a brief overview of these inventions is given.

- Patternable OLEDs: In a study by researchers at General Electric, PEDOT-TMA was used in the hole injection layer in a series of OLED devices. They have also filed a patent application to protect this invention.
- Quantum dot modified OLEDs: In an international patent application, PEDOT-TMA surfaces were modified with quantum dots such as CdSe, CdS, and ZnS.
- Ion selective membranes: PEDOT-TMA was used as a key ingredient in ion selective membranes and in particular in calcium-selective electrodes. The performance of PEDOT-TMA films in solid contact ion selective electrodes compared to other commercially available conducting polymers has also been reported.
- Dye sensitized solar cell: PEDOT-TMA was used in the construction of effective Dye-sensitized solar cells. The PEDOT-TMA was spun-coat to give a 15 nm thick layer which was used as the counter-electrode in a series of Dye-sensitized solar cells. Efficiencies as high as 7.85% were obtained.
- Flexible touch screens: PEDOT-TMA was used in the construction of electrodes for flexible touch screens as described in a patent application by the Honeywell Corporation.
- Energy storage and conversion devices: Synkera Technologies, Inc. filed a patent application detailing a variety of energy storage and conversion devices that use PEDOT-TMA in their construction.
- Glucose sensor: A glucose sensor was prepared by Gymama Slaughter of Virginia State University.
- Carbon nanotube composites: Researchers from Los Alamos National Laboratory used PEDOT-TMA to prepare composites with carbon nanotubes. These composites form highly aligned arrays of the nanotubes, and exhibit high conductivity at room temperature (25.0 S/cm).
- Metal wire-based photovoltaic device: Researchers from The Institute of Advanced Energy at Kyoto University used PEDOT-TMA to fabricate organic photovoltaic devices.
- Embedded capacitors: Researchers from The Polymer Composite Laboratory at VIT University prepared composites of Graphene oxide with PEDOT-TMA and PMMA. They extensively studied the properties of these materials as a function of Graphene oxide composition. The materials were characterized by UV-Vis spectroscopy, FT-IR and FT-Raman spectroscopy, X-Ray diffraction, thermogravimetric analysis, atomic force microscopy and scanning electron microscopy. Finally, the dielectric properties of the materials were evaluated, and the potential application of the composites in constructing embedded capacitors was discussed. This research group has also developed thermistors made from Graphene Oxide/PEDOT-TMA composites.
- Titanium dioxide nanocomposites: A research group led by A.A.M. Farag has prepared and characterized nanocomposites of TiO_{2} and ZnO with PEDOT-TMA. This group has also prepared and characterized heterojunction diodes using this nanocomposite.
- Ultrathin Fiber-Mesh Polymer Thermistors: Ultrathin fibers were prepared that show a 10^3 increase in resistance over a narrow temperature range suitable for on-skin and implantable sensors. These thermistors prevent overheating in devices that use thermal protection circuits.
- Organic electrochemical transistor (OECT): A hydrogel was formed between a composite of methacrylated gelatin, PEDOT-PSS, and PEDOT-TMA. Cross-linking the gel with PEDOT-TMA reduced swelling and improved the conductivity compared to previous efforts. Anticipated benefits of this work are high-performance bioelectronics, sensors, and soft computing systems.
