= Transparent conducting film =

Optically transparent and electrically conductive material

Figure 1. Cross-section of thin film polycrystalline solar cell. The transparent conducting coating contacts the n-type semiconductor to draw current.

Transparent conducting films (TCFs) are thin films of optically transparent and electrically conductive material. They are an important component in a number of electronic devices including liquid-crystal displays, OLEDs, touchscreens and photovoltaics. While indium tin oxide (ITO) is the most widely used, alternatives include wider-spectrum transparent conductive oxides (TCOs), conductive polymers, metal grids and random metallic networks, carbon nanotubes (CNT), graphene, nanowire meshes and ultra thin metal films.

TCFs for photovoltaic applications have been fabricated from both inorganic and organic materials. Inorganic films typically are made up of a layer of transparent conducting oxide (TCO), most commonly indium tin oxide (ITO), fluorine doped tin oxide (FTO), niobium doped anatase TiO_{2} (NTO) or doped zinc oxide. Organic films are being developed using carbon nanotube networks and graphene, which can be fabricated to be highly transparent to infrared light, along with networks of polymers such as poly(3,4-ethylenedioxythiophene) and its derivatives.

Transparent conducting films are typically used as electrodes when a situation calls for low resistance electrical contacts without blocking light (e.g. LEDs, photovoltaics). Transparent materials possess wide bandgaps whose energy value is greater than those of visible light. As such, photons with energies below the bandgap value are not absorbed by these materials and visible light passes through. Some applications, such as solar cells, often require a wider range of transparency beyond visible light to make efficient use of the full solar spectrum.

== Transparent conducting oxides ==
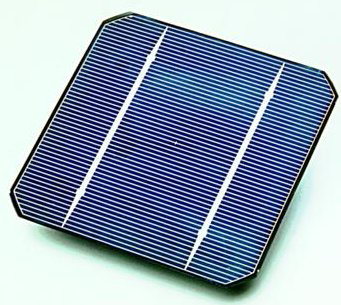
This solar cell, made of monocrystalline silicon, has no transparent conducting film. Instead, it uses a "grid contact": a network of very thin metal wires.

=== Overview ===
Transparent conductive oxides (TCO) are doped metal oxides used in optoelectronic devices such as flat panel displays and photovoltaics (including inorganic devices, organic devices, and dye-sensitized solar cells). Most of these films are fabricated with polycrystalline or amorphous microstructures. Typically, these applications use electrode materials that have greater than 80% transmittance of incident light as well as electrical conductivities higher than 10^{3} S/cm for efficient carrier transport. In general, TCOs for use as thin-film electrodes in solar cells should have a minimum carrier concentration on the order of 10^{20} cm^{−3} for low resistivity and a bandgap greater than 3.2 eV to avoid absorption of light over most of the solar spectra. Mobility in these films is typically limited by ionized impurity scattering due to the large amount of ionized dopant atoms and is on the order of 40 cm^{2}/(V·s) for the best performing TCOs. Current transparent conducting oxides used in industry are primarily n-type conductors, meaning their primary conduction is as donors of electrons. This is because electron mobilities are typically higher than hole mobilities, making it difficult to find shallow acceptors in wide band gap oxides to create a large hole population. Suitable p-type transparent conducting oxides are still being researched, though the best of them are still orders of magnitude behind n-type TCOs. An early p-type TCO was the delafossite oxide CuAlO_{2}; in 1997, Kawazoe et al. reported p-type electrical conduction in transparent CuAlO_{2} thin films, helping establish p-type transparent oxide semiconductor research. The lower carriers' concentration of TCOs with respect to metals shift their plasmonic resonance into the NIR and SWIR range.

To date, the industry standard in TCOs is ITO, or indium tin oxide. This material boasts a low resistivity of ~10^{−4} Ω·cm and a transmittance of greater than 80%. ITO has the drawback of being expensive. Indium, the film's primary metal, is rare (6000 metric tons worldwide in 2006), and its price fluctuates due to market demand (over $800 per kg in 2006). For this reason, doped binary compounds such as aluminum-doped zinc oxide (AZO) and indium-doped cadmium oxide have been proposed as alternative materials. AZO is composed of aluminum and zinc, two common and inexpensive materials, while indium-doped cadmium oxide only uses indium in low concentrations. Several transition metal dopants in indium oxide, particularly molybdenum, give much higher electron mobility and conductivity than obtained with tin and Ta is a promising alternative dopant for tin oxide. Other novel transparent conducting oxides include barium stannate and the correlated metal oxides strontium vanadate and calcium vanadate.

Binary compounds of metal oxides without any intentional impurity doping have also been developed for use as TCOs. These systems are typically n-type with a carrier concentration on the order of 10^{20} cm^{−3}, provided by interstitial metal ions and oxygen vacancies which both act as donors. However, these simple TCOs have not found practical use due to the high dependence of their electrical properties on temperature and oxygen partial pressure.

In current research, labs are looking to optimize the electrical and optical characteristics of certain TCOs. Researchers deposit TCO onto the sample by using a sputtering machine. The targets have been changed and researchers are looking at materials such as IZO (Indium Zinc Oxide), ITO (Indium Tin Oxide) and AZO (Aluminum Zinc Oxide), and they are optimizing these materials by changing parameters within the sputtering deposition machine. When researchers vary parameters such as concentration of the gases within the sputtering, the pressure within the sputtering machine, power of the sputtering, and pressure, they are able to achieve different carrier concentrations and sheet resistivities within the machine. Carrier concentrations affect the short circuit current of the sample, and a change in sheet resistivity affects the fill factor of the sample. Researchers have varied parameters enough and found combinations that will optimize the short circuit current as well as the fill factor for TCOs such as indium tin oxide. Alternatives to ITO have been used such as graphene, or silver nanowire meshes.

=== Fabrication ===
Doped metal oxides for use as transparent conducting layers in photovoltaic devices are typically grown on a glass substrate. This glass substrate, apart from providing a support that the oxide can grow on, has the additional benefit of blocking most infrared wavelengths greater than 2 μm for most silicates, and converting it to heat in the glass layer. This in turn helps maintain a low temperature of the active region of the solar cell, which degrades in performance as it heats up. TCO films can be deposited on a substrate through various deposition methods, including metal organic chemical vapor deposition, metal organic molecular beam deposition, solution deposition, spray pyrolysis, ultrasonic nozzle sprayed graphene oxide and air sprayed Ag Nanowire and pulsed laser deposition (PLD), however conventional fabrication techniques typically involve magnetron sputtering of the film. The sputtering process is very inefficient, with only 30% of planar target material available for deposition on the substrate. Cylindrical targets offer closer to 80% utilization. In the case of ITO recycling of unused target material is required for economic production. For AZO or ZnAl sputtering target material is sufficiently inexpensive that recovery of materials use is of no concern. There is some concern that there is a physical limit to the available indium for ITO. Growth typically is performed in a reducing environment to compensating acceptor defects within the film (e.g. metal vacancies), which degrade the carrier concentration (if n-type).

For AZO thin film deposition, the coating method of reactive magnetron sputtering is very economical and practical way of mass production. In this method, a zinc-aluminum target is sputtered in an oxygen atmosphere such that metal ions oxidize when they reach the substrates surface. By using a metal target instead of an oxide target, direct current magnetron sputtering may be used which enable much faster deposition rates.

=== Theory ===
Charge carriers in these n-type oxides arise from three fundamental sources: interstitial metal ion impurities, oxygen vacancies, and doping ions. The first two sources always act as electron donors; indeed, some TCOs are fabricated solely using these two intrinsic sources as carrier generators. When an oxygen vacancy is present in the lattice it acts as a doubly charged electron donor. In ITO, for example, each oxygen vacancy causes the neighboring In^{3+} ion 5s orbitals to be stabilized from the 5s conduction band by the missing bonds to the oxygen ion, while two electrons are trapped at the site due to charge neutrality effects. This stabilization of the 5s orbitals causes a formation of a donor level for the oxygen ion, determined to be 0.03 eV below the conduction band. Thus these defects act as shallow donors to the bulk crystal. Common notation for this doping is Kröger–Vink notation and is written as:

$$\ce{O_O^\mathit{x} <=> {V_O^{\bullet\bullet}} + {1/2O2(g)} + 2e'}$$

Here "O" in the subscripts indicates that both the initially bonded oxygen and the vacancy that is produced lie on an oxygen lattice site, while the superscripts on the oxygen and vacancy indicate charge. Thus to enhance their electrical properties, ITO films and other transparent conducting oxides are grown in reducing environments, which encourage oxygen vacancy formation.

Dopant ionization within the oxide occurs in the same way as in other semiconductor crystals. Shallow donors near the conduction band (n-type) allow electrons to be thermally excited into the conduction band, while acceptors near the valence band (p-type) allow electrons to jump from the valence band to the acceptor level, populating the valence band with holes. Carrier scattering in these oxides arises primarily from ionized impurity scattering at high dopant levels (>1 at%). Charged impurity ions and point defects have scattering cross-sections that are much greater than their neutral counterparts. Increasing the scattering decreases the mean-free path of the carriers in the oxide, which leads to low electron mobility and a high resistivity. These materials can be modeled reasonably well by the free electron model assuming a parabolic conduction band and doping levels above the Mott Criterion. This criterion states that an insulator such as an oxide can experience a composition-induced transition to a metallic state given a minimum doping concentration n_{c}, determined by:

$$n_{c}^{\frac 1 3} a_\ce{H}^{*} = 0.26 \pm 0.05$$

where a_{H}* is the mean ground state Bohr radius. For ITO, this value requires a minimum doping concentration of roughly 10^{19} cm^{−3}. Above this level, the conduction type in the material switches from semiconductor to metallic.

== Transparent conducting polymers ==
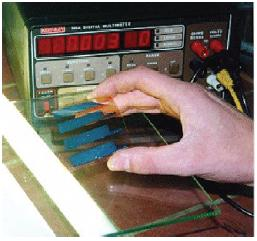
Figure 2. Polymer photovoltaic cell using transparent conducting polymers.

Conductive polymers were reported in the mid the 20th century as derivatives of polyaniline. Research continued on such polymers in the 1960s and 70s and continued into the turn of the 21st century. Most conductive polymers are derivatives of polyacetylene, polyaniline, polypyrrole or polythiophenes. These polymers have conjugated double bonds which allow for conduction. By manipulating the band structure, polythiophenes have been modified to achieve a HOMO-LUMO separation (bandgap) that is large enough to make them transparent to visible light.

=== Applications ===
Transparent conductive polymers are used as electrodes on light emitting diodes and photovoltaic devices. They have conductivity below that of transparent conducting oxides but have low absorption of the visible spectrum allowing them to act as a transparent conductor on these devices. However, because transparent conductive polymers do absorb some of the visible spectrum and significant amounts of the mid to near IR, they lower the efficiency of photovoltaic devices.

The transparent conductive polymers can be made into flexible films making them desirable despite their lower conductivity. This makes them useful in the development of flexible electronics where traditional transparent conductors will fail.

FTO-coated glass provides thermal insulation in buildings by reflecting infrared radiation while allowing visible light, reducing heat loss and improving energy efficiency. It is also used in gas-detecting sensors, and photothermal converters.

=== Poly(3,4-ethylenedioxythiophene) (PEDOT) ===
Poly(3,4-ethylenedioxythiophene) (PEDOT) has conductivity of up to around 1,000 S/cm. Thin oxidized PEDOT films have approx. 10% or less absorption in the visible spectrum and excellent stability. However, PEDOT is insoluble in water making processing more difficult and costly.

The bandgap of PEDOT can be varied between 1.4 and 2.5 eV by varying the degree of π-overlap along the backbone. This can be done by adding substituents along the chain, which result in steric interactions preventing π-overlap. Substituents can also be electron-accepting or donating which will modify the electronic character and thus modify the bandgap. This allows for the formation of a wide bandgap conductor which is transparent to the visible spectrum.

PEDOT is prepared by mixing EDT monomer with an oxidizing agent such as FeCl_{3}. The oxidizing agent acts as an initiator for polymerization. Research has shown that increasing the ratio of [FeCl_{3}]/[monomer] decreases the solubility of the PEDOT. This is thought to be a result of increased crosslinking in the polymer making it more difficult to dissolve in a solvent.

=== Poly(3,4-ethylenedioxythiophene) PEDOT: poly(styrene sulfonate) PSS ===
Doping PEDOT with poly(styrene sulfonate) can improve the properties over the unmodified PEDOT. This PEDOT:PSS compound has become the industry leader in transparent conductive polymers. PEDOT:PSS is water-soluble, making processing easier. PEDOT:PSS has a conductivity ranging from 400 to 600 S/cm while still transmitting ~80% of visible light. Treatment in air at 100 °C for over 1000 hours will result in a minimal change in conductivity. Recently, it was reported that the conductivity of PEDOT:PSS can be improved to be more than 4600 S/cm.

PEDOT:PSS is prepared by polymerizing EDT monomer in an aqueous solution of PSS using Na_{2}S_{2}O_{8} as the oxidizing agent. This aqueous solution is then spin coated and dried to make a film.

=== Poly(4,4-dioctyl cyclopentadithiophene) ===
Poly(4,4-dioctyl cyclopentadithiophene) can be doped with iodine or 2,3-dichloro-5,6-dicyano-1,4-benzoquinone (DDQ) to form a transparent conductor. The doped polymer has low absorption of the visible spectrum with an absorption band centered around 1050 nm. When doped with iodine, a conductivity of 0.35 S/cm can be achieved. However, the iodine has a tendency to diffuse out in air, making the iodine-doped poly(4,4-dioctyl cyclopentadithiophene) unstable.

DDQ itself has a conductivity of 1.1 S/cm. However, DDQ-doped poly(4,4-dioctyl cyclopentadithiophene) also tends to decrease its conductivity in air. DDQ-doped polymer has better stability than the iodine-doped polymer, but the stability is still below that of PEDOT. In summary, poly(4,4-dioctyl cyclopentadithiophene) has inferior properties relative to PEDOT and PEDOT:PSS, which need to be improved for realistic applications.

Poly(4,4-dioctyl cyclopentadithiophene) is solution polymerized by combining monomer with iron(III) chloride. Once the polymerization is complete the doping is done by exposing the polymer to iodine vapor or DDQ solution.

== Carbon nanotubes ==
=== Advantages ===
Transparent conductors are fragile and tend to break down due to fatigue. The most commonly used TCO is Indium-Tin-Oxide (ITO) because of its good electrical properties and ease of fabrication. However, these thin films are usually fragile and such problems as lattice mismatch and stress-strain constraints lead to restrictions in possible uses for TCFs. ITO has been shown to degrade with time when subject to mechanical stresses. Recent increases in cost are also forcing many to look to carbon nanotube films as a potential alternative.

Carbon nanotubes (CNTs) have attracted much attention because of their materials properties, including a high elastic modulus (~1–2 TPa), a high tensile strength (~13–53 GPa), and a high conductivity (metallic tubes can theoretically carry an electric current density of 4 billion A/cm^{2}, which is ~1000 times higher than for other metals such as copper). CNT thin films have been used as transparent electrodes in TCFs because of these good electronic properties.

=== Preparation of CNT thin films ===
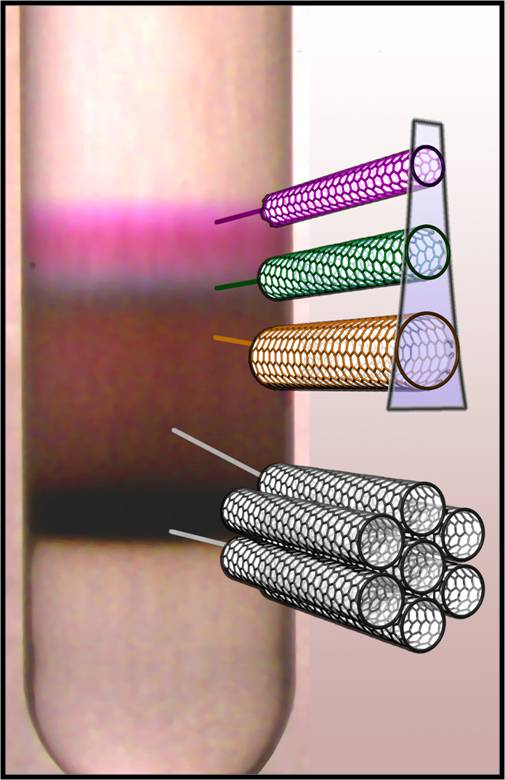
Figure 3. CNTs of various diameters separated within a centrifuge tube. Each distinct diameter results in a different color.

The preparation of CNT thin films for TCFs is composed of three steps: the CNT growth process, putting the CNTs in solution, and, finally, creation of the CNT thin film. Nanotubes can be grown using laser ablation, electric-arc discharge, or different forms of chemical vapor deposition (such as PECVD). However, nanotubes are grown en-masse, with nanotubes of different chiralities stuck together due to van der Waals attraction. Density gradient ultracentrifugation (DGU) has recently been used to get rid of this problem. Using DGU, transparent conductors were constructed using only metallic tubes. Because DGU allows for separation by density, tubes with similar optical properties (due to similar diameters) were selected and used to make CNT conductive films of different colors.

In order to separate the grown tubes, the CNTs are mixed with surfactant and water and sonicated until satisfactory separation occurs. This solution is then sprayed onto the desired substrate in order to create a CNT thin film. The film is then rinsed in water in order to get rid of excess surfactant.

One method of spray deposition used for CNT film creation is an ultrasonic nozzle to atomize CNTs in solution to form PEDOT layers.

By optimizing spray parameters, including surfactant, drop size (dictated by the ultrasonic nozzle frequency) and solution flow rate, sheet resistance characteristics can be tuned. Due to the ultrasonic vibration of the nozzle itself, this method also provides an additional level of sonification during the spray process for added separation of agglomerated CNTs.

=== Comparing CNTs to TCOs ===
CNTs can also be used in addition to transparent conducting oxides (TCOs) in thin-film photovoltaic devices. Two TCOs which are often used are ZnO/Al and In_{2}O_{3}/Sn indium tin oxide (ITO). PV devices made with these TCOs attained energy-conversion efficiencies of 19.5% in CuIn_{1−x}Ga_{x}Se_{2}-based (CIGS) solar cells and 16.5% in CdTe-based solar cells. These photovoltaic devices had much higher efficiencies compared to the devices made with CNT thin films: Britz et al. report an efficiency of 8%, with an open circuit voltage (V_{oc}) of 0.676 V, a short circuit flux (J_{sc}) of 23.9 mA/cm^{2}, and a fill factor of 45.48%. However, CNT thin films show many advantages over other transparent electrodes in the IR range. CNT thin films were reported to have a transmittance of over 90% in this range (400 nm – 22 μm). This paves the way for new applications, indicating that CNT thin films can be used as heat dissipaters in solar cells because of this high transmittance.

As stated previously, nanotube chirality is important in helping determine its potential aid to these devices. Before mass production can occur, more research is needed in exploring the significance of tube diameter and chirality for transparent conducting films in photovoltaic applications. It is expected that the conductivity of the SWNT thin films will increase with an increase in CNT length and purity. As stated previously, the CNT films are made using randomly oriented bundles of CNTs. Ordering these tubes should also increase conductivity, as it will minimise scattering losses and improve contact between the nanotubes.

=== Conducting nanowire networks and metal mesh as flexible transparent electrodes ===
Figure 4. Schematic of metal network based Transparent Conducting Electrodes. Electrical transport is through the percolating metal network, while optical transmittance is through the voids. Source: Ankush Kumar (JNCASR) Thesis.

Randomly conducting networks of wires or metal meshes obtained from templates are new generation transparent electrodes. In these electrodes, nanowire or metal mesh network is charge collector, while the voids between them are transparent to light. These are obtained from the deposition of silver or copper nanowires, or by depositing metals in templates such as hierarchical patterns of random cracks, leaves venation and grain boundaries etc. These metal networks can be made on flexible substrates and can act as flexible transparent electrodes. For better performance of these conducting network based electrodes, optimised density of nanowires has to be used as excess density, leads to shadowing losses in solar cells, while the lower density of the wires, leads to higher sheet resistance and more recombination losses of charge carriers generated in solar cells.
