= Photothermal therapy =

Potential cancer treatment

Photothermal therapy (PTT) refers to efforts to use electromagnetic radiation (most often in infrared wavelengths) for the treatment of various medical conditions, including cancer. This neurotherapy is an extension of photodynamic therapy, in which a photosensitizer is excited with specific band light. This activation brings the sensitizer to an excited state where it then releases vibrational energy (heat), which is what kills the targeted cells.

Unlike photodynamic therapy, photothermal therapy does not require oxygen to interact with the target cells or tissues. Current studies also show that photothermal therapy is able to use longer wavelength light, which is less energetic and therefore less harmful to other cells and tissues.

== Nanoscale materials ==
Most materials of interest currently being investigated for photothermal therapy are on the nanoscale. One of the key reasons behind this is the enhanced permeability and retention effect observed with particles in a certain size range (typically 20–300 nm). Molecules in this range have been observed to preferentially accumulate in tumor tissue. When a tumor forms, it requires new blood vessels in order to fuel its growth; these new blood vessels in/near tumors have different properties as compared to regular blood vessels, such as poor lymphatic drainage and a disorganized, leaky vasculature. These factors lead to a significantly higher concentration of certain particles in a tumor as compared to the rest of the body.

=== Gold NanoRods (AuNR) ===
Huang et al. investigated the feasibility of using gold nanorods for both cancer cell imaging as well as photothermal therapy. The authors conjugated antibodies (anti-EGFR monoclonal antibodies) to the surface of gold nanorods, allowing the gold nanorods to bind specifically to certain malignant cancer cells (HSC and HOC malignant cells). After incubating the cells with the gold nanorods, an 800 nm Ti:sapphire laser was used to irradiate the cells at varying powers. The authors reported successful destruction of the malignant cancer cells, while nonmalignant cells were unharmed.

When AuNRs are exposed to NIR light, the oscillating electromagnetic field of the light causes the free electrons of the AuNR to collectively coherently oscillate. Changing the size and shape of AuNRs changes the wavelength that gets absorbed. A desired wavelength would be between 700-1000 nm because biological tissue is optically transparent at these wavelengths. While all AuNP are sensitive to change in their shape and size, Au nanorods properties are extremely sensitive to any change in any of their dimensions regarding their length and width or their aspect ratio. When light is shone on a metal NP, the NP forms a dipole oscillation along the direction of the electric field. When the oscillation reaches its maximum, this frequency is called the surface plasmon resonance (SPR). AuNR have two SPR spectrum bands: one in the NIR region caused by its longitudinal oscillation which tends to be stronger with a longer wavelength and one in the visible region caused by the transverse electronic oscillation which tends to be weaker with a shorter wavelength. The SPR characteristics account for the increase in light absorption for the particle. As the AuNR aspect ratio increases, the absorption wavelength is redshifted and light scattering efficiency is increased. The electrons excited by the NIR lose energy quickly after absorption via electron-electron collisions, and as these electrons relax back down, the energy is released as a phonon that then heats the environment of the AuNP which in cancer treatments would be the cancerous cells. This process is observed when a laser has a continuous wave onto the AuNP. Pulsed laser light beams generally results in the AuNP melting or ablation of the particle. Continuous wave lasers take minutes rather than a single pulse time for a pulsed laser, continues wave lasers are able to heat larger areas at once.

=== Gold Nanoshells ===
Gold nanoshells, coated silica nanoparticles with a thin layer of gold. have been conjugated to antibodies (anti-HER2 or anti-IgG) via PEG linkers. After incubation of SKBr3 cancer cells with the gold nanoshells, an 820 nm laser was used to irradiate the cells. Only the cells incubated with the gold nanoshells conjugated with the specific antibody (anti-HER2) were damaged by the laser. Another category of gold nanoshells are gold layer on liposomes, as soft template. In this case, drug can also be encapsulated inside and/or in bilayer and the release can be triggered by laser light.

=== thermo Nano-Architectures (tNAs) ===
The failure of clinical translation of nanoparticles-mediated PTT is mainly ascribed to concerns about their persistence in the body. Indeed, the optical response of anisotropic nanomaterials can be tuned in the NIR region by increasing their size to up to 150 nm. On the other hand, body excretion of non-biodegradable noble metals nanomaterials above 10 nm occurs through the hepatobiliary route in a slow and inefficient manner. A common approach to avoid metal persistence is to reduce the nanoparticles size below the threshold for renal clearance, i.e. ultrasmall nanoparticles (USNPs), meanwhile the maximum light-to-heat transduction is for < 5 nm nanoparticles. On the other hand, the surface plasmon of excretable gold USNPs is in the UV/visible region (far from the first biological windows), severely limiting their potential application in PTT.

Excretion of metals has been combined with NIR-triggered PTT by employing ultrasmall-in-nano architectures composed by metal USNPs embedded in biodegradable silica nanocapsules. tNAs are the first reported NIR-absorbing plasmonic ultrasmall-in-nano platforms that jointly combine: i) photothermal conversion efficacy suitable for hyperthermia, ii) multiple photothermal sequences and iii) renal excretion of the building blocks after the therapeutic action. Nowadays, tNAs therapeutic effect has been assessed on valuable 3D models of human pancreatic adenocarcinoma.

=== Graphene and graphene oxide ===
Graphene is viable for photothermal therapy. An 808 nm laser at a power density of 2 W/cm^{2} was used to irradiate the tumor sites on mice for 5 minutes. As noted by the authors, the power densities of lasers used to heat gold nanorods range from 2 to 4 W/cm^{2}. Thus, these nanoscale graphene sheets require a laser power on the lower end of the range used with gold nanoparticles to photothermally ablate tumors.

In 2012, Yang et al. incorporated the promising results regarding nanoscale reduced graphene oxide reported by Robinson et al. into another in vivo mice study. The therapeutic treatment used in this study involved the use of nanoscale reduced graphene oxide sheets, nearly identical to the ones used by Robinson et al. (but without any active targeting sequences attached). Nanoscale reduced graphene oxide sheets were successfully irradiated in order to completely destroy the targeted tumors. Most notably, the required power density of the 808 nm laser was reduced to 0.15 W/cm^{2}, an order of magnitude lower than previously required power densities. This study demonstrates the higher efficacy of nanoscale reduced graphene oxide sheets as compared to both nanoscale graphene sheets and gold nanorods.

=== Conjugated polymers (CPs) ===
PTT utilizes photothermal transduction agents (PTAs) which can transform light energy to heat through photothermal effect to raise the temperature of tumor area and thus cause the ablation of tumor cells. Specifically, ideal PTAs should have high photothermal conversion efficiency (PCE), excellent optical stability and biocompatibility, and strong light adsorption in the near-infrared (NIR) region (650-1350 nm) due to the deep-tissue penetration and minimal absorption of NIR light in the biological tissues. PTAs mainly include inorganic materials and organic materials. Inorganic PTAs, such as noble metal materials, carbon-based nanomaterials, and other 2D materials, have high PCE and excellent photostability, but they are not biodegradable and thus have potential long-term toxicity in vivo. Organic PTAs including small molecule dyes and conjugated polymers (CPs) have good biocompatibility and biodegradability, but poor photostability. Among them, small molecule dyes, such as cyanine, porphyrin, phthalocyanine, are limited in the field of cancer treatment because of their susceptibility to photobleaching and poor tumor enrichment ability. Conjugated polymers with large π−π conjugated skeleton and a high electron delocalization structure show potential for PTT due to their strong NIR absorption, excellent photostability, low cytotoxicity, outstanding PCE, good dispersibility in aqueous medium, increased accumulation at tumor site, and long blood circulation time. Moreover, conjugated polymers can be easily combined with other imaging agents and drugs to construct multifunctional nanomaterials for selective and synergistic cancer therapy.

The CPs used for tumor PTT mainly include polyaniline (PANI), polypyrrole (PPy), polythiophene (PTh), polydopamine (PDA), donor−acceptor (D-A) conjugated polymers, and poly(3,4-ethylenedioxythiophene):poly(4-styrenesulfonate) (PEDOT:PSS).

==== Photothermal conversion mechanism ====
The nonradiative process for heat generation of organic PTAs is different from that of inorganic PTAs such as metals and semiconductors which is related with surface plasmon resonance. As shown in the figure, conjugated polymers are first activated to the excited state (S1) under light irradiation and then excited state (S1) decays back to the ground state (S0) via three processes: (I) emitting a photon (fluorescence), (II) intersystem crossing, and (III) nonradiative relaxation (heat generation). Because these three pathways of the S1 decaying back to the S0 are usually competitive in photosensitive materials, light emitting and intersystem crossing must be efficiently reduced in order to increase the heat generation and improve the photothermal conversion efficiency. For conjugated polymers, on the one hand, their unique structures lead to closed stacking of the molecular sensitizers with highly frequent intermolecular collisions which can efficiently quench the fluorescence and intersystem crossing, and thus enhance the yield of nonradiative relaxation. On the other hand, compared with monomeric phototherapeutic molecules, conjugated polymers possess higher stability in vivo against disassembly and photobleaching, longer blood circulation time, and more accumulation at tumor site due to the enhanced permeability and retention (EPR) effect. Therefore, conjugated polymers have high photothermal conversion efficiency and a large amount of heat generation. One of the most widely used equations to calculate photothermal conversion efficiency (η) of organic PTAs is as follows:

η = (hAΔΤ_{max}-Qs)/I(1-10^{-Aλ})

where h is the heat transfer coefficient, A is the container surface area, ΔΤ_{max} means the maximum temperature change in the solution, A_{λ} means the light absorbance, I is the laser power density, and Qs is the heat associated with the light absorbance of the solvent.

Furthermore, various efficient methods, especially donor-acceptor (D-A) strategy, have been designed to enhance the photothermal conversion efficiency and heat generation of conjugated polymers. The D-A assembly system in the conjugated polymers contributes to strong intermolecular electron transfer from the donor to the acceptor, thus bringing efficient fluorescence and intersystem crossing quenching, and improved heat generation. In addition, the HOMO–LUMO gap of the D−A conjugated polymers can be easily tuned through changing the selection of electron donor (ED) and electron acceptor (EA) moieties, and thus D−A structured polymers with extremely low band gap can be developed to improve the NIR absorption and photothermal conversion efficiency of CPs.

==== Polyaniline (PANI) ====
Polyaniline (PANI) is one of the earliest types of conjugated polymers reported for tumor PTT.

==== Polypyrrole (PPy) ====
Polypyrrole (PPy) is suited for PTT applications because of its strong NIR absorbance, large PCE, stability, and biocompatibility. In vivo experiments show that tumors treated with PPy NPs could be effectively eliminated under the irradiation of an 808 nm laser (1 W cm^{−2}, 5 min). PPy nanosheets exhibit promising photothermal ablation ability toward cancer cells in the NIR II window for deep-tissue PTT.

PPy nanoparticles and its derivative nanomaterials can also be combined with imaging contrast agents and diverse drugs to construct multifunctional theranostic applications in imaging-guided PTT and synergistic treatment, including fluorescent imaging, magnetic resonance imaging (MRI), photoacoustic imaging (PA), computed tomography (CT), photodynamic therapy (PDT), chemotherapy, etc. For example, PPy has been used to encapsulate ultrasmall iron oxide nanoparticles (IONPs) and finally develop IONP@PPy NPs for in vivo MR and PA imaging-guided PTT. Polypyrrole (I-PPy) nanocomposites have been investigated for CT imaging-guided tumor PTT.

==== Polythiophene (PTh) ====
Polythiophene (PTh) and its derivatives-based polymers are also one kind of conjugated polymers for PTT. Polythiophene-based polymers usually exhibit excellent photostability, large light-harvesting ability, easy synthesis, and facile functionalization with different substituents.

Conjugated copolymer (C3) with promising photothermal properties can be prepared by linking 2-N,N′-bis(2-(ethyl)hexyl)-perylene-3,4,9,10-tetra-carboxylic acid bis-imide to a thienylvinylene oligomer. C3 was coprecipitated with PEG-PCL and indocyanine green (ICG) to obtain PEG-PCL-C3-ICG nanoparticles for fluorescence-guided photothermal/photodynamic therapy against oral squamous cell carcinoma (OSCC). A biodegradable PLGA-PEGylated DPPV (poly{2,2′-[(2,5-bis(2-hexyldecyl)-3,6-dioxo-2,3,5,6-tetrahydropyrrolo[3,4-c]-pyrrole-1,4-diyl)-dithiophene]-5,5′-diyl-alt-vinylene) conjugated polymer for PA-guided PTT with PCE 71% (@ 808 nm, 0.3 W cm−2). The vinylene bonds in the main chain improves the biodegradability, biocompatibility and photothermal conversion efficiency of CPs.

==== Polydopamine (PDA) ====
Dopamine is one of neurotransmitters in the body which helps cells send impulses. Polydopamine (PDA) is obtained through the self-aggregation of dopamine to form a melanin-like substance under mild alkaline conditions. PDA has strong NIR absorption, good photothermal stability, excellent biocompatibility and biodegradability, and high photothermal conversion efficiency. Furthermore, with π conjugated structure and different active groups, PDA can be easily combined with various materials to achieve multifunction, such as fluorescence imaging, MRI, CT, PA, targeted therapy etc. In view of this, PDA and its composite nanomaterials have a broad application prospect in the biomedical field.

Dopamine-melanin colloidal nanospheres is an efficient near-infrared photothermal therapeutic agent for in vivo cancer therapy. PDA can also be modified on the surface of other PTAs, such as gold nanorods, carbon-based materials, to enhance the photothermal stability and efficiency in vivo. For example, PDA-modified spiky gold nanoparticles (SGNP@PDAs) have been investigated for chemo-photothermal therapy.

==== Donor−Acceptor (D−A) CPs ====
Donor−acceptor (D−A) conjugated polymers have been investigated for the medicinal purposes. Nano-PCPDTBT CPs have two moieties: 2-ethylhexyl cyclopentadithiophene and 2,1,3-benzothiadiazole. When the PCPDTBT nanoparticle solution (0.115 mg/mL) was exposed to an 808 nm NIR laser (0.6 W/cm^{2}), the temperature could be increased by more than 30 °C. Wang et al. designed four NIR-absorbing D-A structured conjugated polymer dots (Pdots) containing diketopyrrolo-pyrrole (DPP) and thiophene units as effective photothermal materials with the PCE up to 65% for in vivo cancer therapy. Zhang et al. constructed PBIBDF-BT D-A CPs by using isoindigo derivative (BIBDF) and bithiophene (BT) as EA and ED respectively. PBIBDF-BT was further modified with poly(ethylene glycol)-block-poly(hexyl ethylene phosphate) (mPEG-b-PHEP) to obtain PBIBDF-BT@NP PPE with PCE of 46.7% and high stability in physiological environment. Yang's group designed PBTPBF-BT CPs, in which the bis(5-oxothieno[3,2-b]pyrrole-6-ylidene)-benzodifurandione (BTPBF) and the 3,3′-didodecyl-2,2′-bithiophene (BT) units acting as EA and ED respectively. The D-A CPs have a maximum absorption peak at 1107 nm and a relative high photothermal conversion efficiency (66.4%). Pu et al. synthesized PC70BM-PCPDTBT D-A CPs via nanoprecipitation of EA (6,6)-phenyl-C71-butyric acid methyl ester (PC70BM) and ED PCPDTBT (SPs) for PA-guided PTT. Wang et al. developed D-A CPs TBDOPV-DT containing thiophene-fused benzodifurandione-based oligo(p-phenylenevinylene) (TBDOPV) as EA unit and 2,2′-bithio-phene (DT) as ED unit. TBDOPV-DT CPs have a strong absorption at 1093 nm and achieve highly efficient NIR-II photothermal conversion.

==== PEDOT:PSS ====
Poly(3,4-ethylenedioxythiophene):poly(4-styrenesulfonate) (PEDOT:PSS) is often used in organic electronics and have strong NIR absorption. In 2012, Liu's group first reported PEGylated PEDOT:PSS polymeric nanoparticle (PEDOT:PSS-PEG) for near-infrared photothermal therapy of cancer. PEDOT:PSS-PEG nanoparticles have high stability in vivo and long blood circulation half-life of 21.4 ± 3.1 h. The PTT in animals showed no appreciable side effects for the tested dose and an excellent therapeutic efficacy under the 808 nm laser irradiation. Kang et al. synthesized magneto-conjugated polymer core−shell MNP@PEDOT:PSS nanoparticles for multimodal imaging-guided PTT. Furthermore, PEDOT:PSS NPs can not only serve as PTAs but also as a drug carrier to load various types of drugs, such as SN38, chemotherapy drugs DOX and photodynamic agent chlorin e6 (Ce6), thus achieving synergistic cancer therapy.

== See also ==
- Photomedicine
- Light Therapy
- Hyperthermia therapy
- Experimental cancer treatment
