= Chemically modified electrode =

A chemically modified electrode is an electrical conductor that has its surface modified for different electrochemical functions. Chemically modified electrodes are made using advanced approaches to electrode systems by adding a thin film or layer of certain chemicals to change properties of the conductor according to its targeted function.

At a modified electrode, an oxidation-reduction substance accomplishes electrocatalysis by transferring electrons from the electrode to a reactant, or a reaction substrate.

Modifying electrodes' surfaces has been one of the most active areas of research interest in electrochemistry since 1979, providing control over how electrodes interacts with their environments.

== Description ==
Chemically modified electrodes are different from other types of electrodes as they have a molecular monolayer or micrometers-thick layers of film made from a certain chemical (depending on the function of the electrode). The thin film is coated on the surface of the electrode. The outcome would be a modified electrode with special new chemical properties in terms of physical, chemical, electrochemical, optical, electrical, transport, and other useful properties.

Chemically modified electrodes and electrodes in general heavily depend on electron transport: a general term for electrochemical processes where the charge transports through the chemical films to the electrode. The term "coverage" is used to express the area-normalized in mol/m² of a specific type of chemical site in the thin chemical film in on the surface of the chemically modified electrode.

== Purpose of developing chemically modified electrodes ==
Advancements in the field of electrochemical science kept getting more thorough until scientists in the field found no use of bare surfaces to continue their investigations. The reason behind that is that researches that involved electrodes required certain chemical and physical properties that did not naturally exist in the materials used as electrical conductors. To work their way out of the dilemma, they used chemical modification to tailor the materials they used. Atoms, molecules, and nano-particles are attached to the surface of materials to modify their electronic and structural properties, leading to changing their functionality.

== Applications of chemically modified electrodes ==
In their first stages, chemically modified electrodes were merely applied in technologies they were initially made for (tuning surfaces for electrochemical investigations). After that, chemically modified electrodes provided powerful routes to tune the performance of electrodes. The modification of electrodes facilitated the following processes in electroanalytical chemistry:

- Providing selectivity of electrodes
- Resisting fouling
- Concentrating species
- Improving electrocatalytic properties
- Limiting access of interferences in complex samples

It also provided a route for other purposes, such as:

- Researching energy conversion
- Researching the phenomena that influence electrochemical processes
- Storing and protecting corrosion
- Developing molecular electronics
- Developing electrochromic devices

The research fields where chemically modified electrodes are used include:

Basic electrochemical investigations
Electron transfer between electrodes and electrolytes.
Electrostaticity on electrode surfaces
stationary or slow electric charges.
Polymer electron transport and ionic transport
Movement of electrons from one species or atom to another, with a special focus on polymers.
Design of electrochemical systems and devices
The creation of systems and devices that use chemically modified electrodes with all the required specifications of the systems or devices.

== Approaches to chemically modify electrodes ==
The surface of electrodes can be modified in the following ways:

(1) Adsorption (Chemisorption)
A method that uses the same kind of valence forces involved in formation of chemical compounds, where the film is strongly adsorbed, or chemisorbed, onto the surface of the electrode, yielding monolayer coverage. This approach involves substrate-coupled self-assembled monolayers (SAMs), where molecules are spontaneously chemisorbed to the surface of the electrode, resulting in a microscopic superlattice structure of layers formed on it.

Figure 1. Representation of a SAM structure

(2) Covalent bonding
A method that uses chemical agents to create a covalent bond between one or more monomolecular layers of the chemical modifier and the electrode surface. The common agents to use in this method include organosilanes and cyanuric chloride.

(3) Polymer film coating
A method that uses one of the following to hold electron-conductive and nonconductive polymer films on the electrode surface:

- Chemisorption and low solubility in the contacting solution
- Physical anchoring in a porous electrode

This method includes removing chemical species (substrate) from self-assembled monolayers to allow adsorbing molecules on the electrode surface independently of the original substrate structure. The polymer films can be organic, organometallic or inorganic, and it can either contain the chemical modifier or have the chemical added to the polymer in a latter process.

(4) Composite
A method that has the chemical modifier mixed with an electrode matrix material. An example for this method is having an electron-transfer mediator (the chemical modifier) mixed with carbon particles in a carbon paste electrode (the electrode matrix).

Carbon paste, glassy carbon paste, glassy carbon etc. electrodes when modified are termed as chemically modified electrodes. Chemically modified electrodes have been employed for the analysis of organic and inorganic species.
