= Chemical modification =

Chemical modification refers to a number of various processes involving the alteration of the chemical constitution or structure of molecules.

== Chemical modification of proteins ==
Chemical modification is the change of biomolecular structure and function due to the addition or removal of modifying elements. This is usually accomplished via chemical reactions or a series of chemical reactions that may or may not be reversible. Chemical modifications can be done to any of the four major macromolecules (proteins, nucleic acids, carbohydrates, and lipids); however, we will be focusing on the modification of proteins in this article. Chemical modifications are important because they can improve the molecule's stability, which would increase the stability of the biomolecules and would have a role in allowing the organism to better cope with physiological stressors. Modification of proteins can also introduce the possibility of using them as drugs for possible treatment of a wide range of diseases. Chemical modifiers on compounds that can be used as drugs can also be used to attempt to increase the shelf life of the product or extend its function.

Chemical modification is also another method in which more variability is introduced into the proteome. Chemical modifications of proteins are ever-changing due to the fluctuating needs of the organism. Common chemical modifications include phosphorylation, glycosylation, ubiquitination, methylation, lipidation, and proteolysis. Although we will cover each type of chemical modification singularly, they can often work in conjunction with each other to modify the protein. Due to the large variety of modifications possible, the study of chemical modifications is ongoing.

Type of Modification	Brief Description:
Phosphorylation	Addition or removal of phosphate group (-PO_{3} ) to a protein.
Glycosylation	Addition of a (mono-/di-/poly-) saccharide to a protein.
Ubiquination	Addition of a (mono-/poly-) ubiquitin molecule to a protein. Usually used to target for degradation.
Methylation	Addition of a methyl (-CH_{3}) group to a protein.
Lipidation	Addition of a lipid/fatty acid to a protein.
Proteolysis	Enzymes that catalyze the breakdown of other proteins.

=== Phosphorylation ===
Phosphorylation occurs when a PO_{3} (phosphoryl) group is added to a protein. This chemical modification is the most extensively studied and is reversible. The result of those studies has shown that phosphorylation acts as a regulator for proteins in two ways: the addition or removal of phosphoryl group can impact enzyme kinetics by turning on or off the enzymatic function via conformational changes and the phosphorylation of one protein can attract neighboring similar proteins to also bind to the phosphorylated motif to induce signal transduction pathways.

The mechanism for phosphorylation utilizes kinases and phosphatases which are enzymes that are used to transfer the phosphoryl group onto and off of the targeted biomolecule. Often, kinases are accompanied by ATP or GTP to help facilitate the transfer of the phosphoryl group. Phosphorylation of a kinase can trigger one of two signal transduction pathways. These pathways may either be linear or a cascade transduction pathway. Cascade signal transduction pathways lead to the phosphorylation of many amino acids and utilize second messengers to amplify the signal to elicit a larger response. Phosphatases can act as a regulator and editor of cellular signaling pathways forming transient protein-protein interactions.

Kinases are most associated with activating enzymatic activity, and phosphatases are most associated with turning off enzymatic activity, they can also perform the opposite function (Kinases can turn off enzymatic activity and Phosphatases can turn off enzymatic activity). Kinases and phosphatases can also have other binding sites that can attach to other signaling proteins.

Phosphorylation and dephosphorylation of proteins through the activity of kinases and phosphatases play an important role in many biological processes such as cell proliferation through the MAPK, PI3K, Akt, mTOR, PKA, and PKC signaling pathway Because over-activation of kinases is associated with cancer progression, drugs that work to inhibit the function of kinases have been developed as possible treatments.

=== Glycosylation ===
Another well-studied chemical modification is glycosylation. Glycosylation is the process by which sugar molecules are attached to protein. The length of the attached saccharide is variable and impacts the structure, activity, and stability of the protein it is attached to. Many proteins that are glycosylated are often found on cell surfaces and play a large role in determining blood type.

=== Ubiquitination ===
Ubiquitin is made up of 76 amino acids that can exist on its own or attached to a protein. When ubiquitin is attached to a protein (the amount of ubiquitin that binds to the protein varies) it can function to target that protein for degradation or trigger kinase activation. There are three enzymes that function in the ubiquitination pathway: Ubiquitin-activating enzyme (E1), Ubiquitin-conjugating enzyme (E2), and Ubiquitin-protein ligase (E3). Generally, E1 activates ubiquitin and transfers it to E2. E3 transfers ubiquitin to the target protein. This pathway is closely regulated and is very specific. Monoubiquitination (one ubiquitin protein) of a protein does not typically signal for protein degradation, instead it primarily functions to facilitate histone regulation, endocytosis, and nuclear export. Polyubiquination (multiple ubiquitin proteins) of a protein typically triggers protein degradation, especially if they are bound to a lysine residue. The degradation function of ubiquitin is the most well-understood as it has been linked to the NF-𝜿B signaling pathway for triggering inflammation. It has also been implicated as playing a role in cancer and other diseases.

=== Methylation ===
Methylation is the transfer of one methyl group (Carbon atom that is bonded to three Hydrogen atoms) to a protein via enzymes called methyltransferases. It is also often used by histone proteins to allow certain regions of the genome to wind and unwind and become accessible for transcription.

=== Lipidation ===
Lipidation is the process of attaching lipids to proteins to tag them as membrane-bound proteins. Different lipid attachments increase the protein's affinity for different membrane types (plasma membrane, organelle membrane, and vesicles). There are four common types of lipidation: GPI anchors, N-terminal myristoylation, S-myristoylation, and S-prenylation.

=== Proteolysis ===
Proteolysis is the pathway used to break peptide bonds. Oftentimes, peptide bonds are stable in typical physiological conditions and may need enzymes called proteases to assist in breaking polypeptides into smaller components. This is especially important during cell signaling, removing misfolded proteins, and programmed cell death (apoptosis). In some cases, proteolysis can be used to regulate the enzymatic activity of zymogens (inactive enzymes that require some bonds to be cleaved in order to be activated). There are four main types of proteases: serine proteases, cysteine proteases, aspartic acid proteases, and zinc metalloproteases.

== Chemically modified electrodes ==
Chemically modified electrodes are electrodes that have their surfaces chemically converted to change the electrode's properties, such as its physical, chemical, electrochemical, optical, electrical, and transport characteristics. These electrodes are used for advanced purposes in research and investigation.

== In biochemistry ==
In biochemistry, chemical modification is the technique of anatomically reacting a protein or nucleic acid with a reagent or reagents. Obtaining laboratory information through chemical modification which can be utilized to:

- identify which parts of a molecule are exposed to a solvent.
- determine which residues are important for a particular phenotype, e.g., which residues are important for an enzymatic activity;
- introduce new groups into a macromolecule; and
- crosslink macromolecules intra- and intermolecularly.

=== Chemical modification of protein side chains ===
- Iodoacetamide
- Iodoacetic acid
- PEGylation
- BisSulfosuccinimidyl suberate
- 1-Ethyl-3-(3-dimethylaminopropyl)carbodiimide
- N-Ethylmaleimide
- Methyl methanethiosulfonate
- S-(1-oxyl-2,2,5,5-tetramethyl-2,5-dihydro-1H-pyrrol-3-yl)methyl methanesulfonothioate
