= Bipolaron =

Bipolaron may refer to:

- Bipolaron (physics), a quasiparticle excitation
- Bipolaron (chemistry), a type of molecule or part of a macromolecular chain
