= Bipolaron (chemistry) =

Class of chemical compound

In organic chemistry, bipolaron is a molecule or part of a macromolecular chain containing two positive charges in a conjugated system. The charges can be located in the centre of the chain or at its termini. Bipolarons and polarons are encountered in doped conducting polymers such as polythiophene.

It is possible to synthesize and isolate bipolaron model compounds for X-ray diffraction studies. The diamagnetic bis(triaryl)amine dication 2 in scheme 1 is prepared from the neutral precursor 1 in dichloromethane by reaction with 4 equivalents of antimony pentachloride. Two resonance structures exist for the dication. Structure 2a is a (singlet) diradical and 2b is the closed shell quinoid. The experimental bond lengths for the central vinylidene group in 2 are 141 pm and 137 pm compared to 144 pm and 134 pm for the precursor 1 implying some contribution from the quinoid structure.

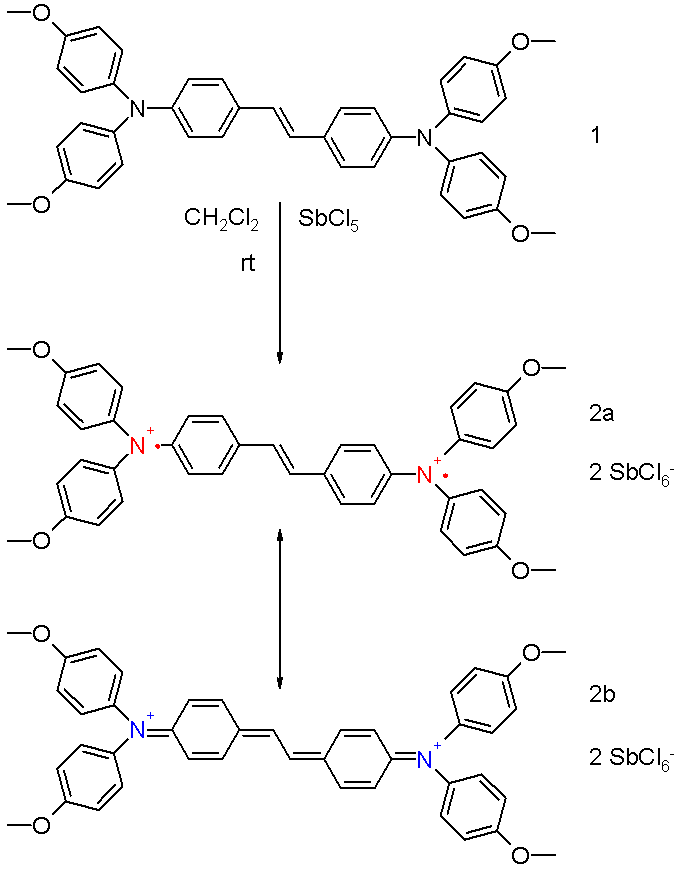
Scheme 1. BisTriarylamine Dication

On the other hand, when a thiophene unit is added to the core in the structure depicted in scheme 2, these bond lengths are identical (around 138 pm) making it a true hybrid.

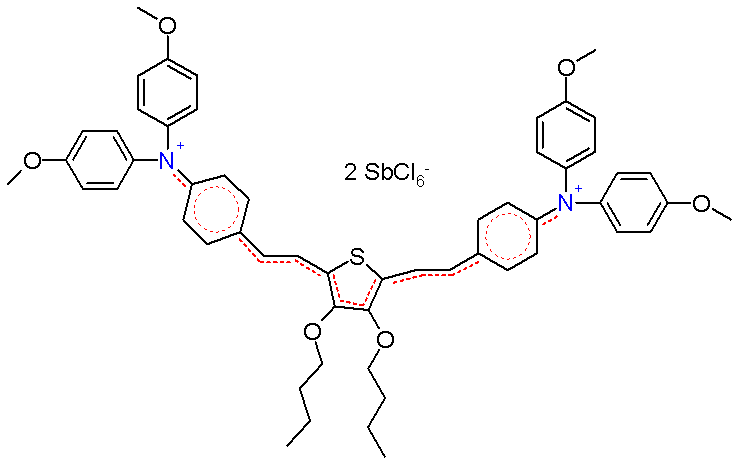
Scheme 2 Thiophene based bipolaron

== See also ==
- Quinonoid zwitterions
