= Layer (electronics) =

In electronic engineering, a layer is the deposition of molecules on a substrate or base (glass, ceramic, semiconductor, or [bio]plastic). High temperature substrates include stainless steel, polyimide film, and PET.

Generally, a layer with a depth of less than one micrometre is called a thin film, while a depth greater than one micrometre is called a coating.

== See also ==
- Coating
- Heterojunction
- Nanoparticle
- Organic electronics
- Passivation
- Printed electronics
- Sputtering
- Thermal annealing
- Transparent conducting oxide
