= Poly(p-phenylene vinylene) =

Polyphenylene vinylene

Names
- Other names poly(1,4-phenylene-1,2-ethenediyl)

Identifiers
CAS Number	26009-24-5
ChemSpider	none

Properties
Chemical formula	(C_{8}H_{6})_{n}
Appearance	Yellow solid
Solubility in water	Insoluble
- Except where otherwise noted, data are given for materials in their standard state (at 25 °C [77 °F], 100 kPa). verify (what is ?) Infobox references

Poly(p-phenylene vinylene) (PPV, or polyphenylene vinylene) is a conducting polymer of the rigid-rod polymer family. PPV is the only polymer of this type that can be processed into a highly ordered crystalline thin film. PPV and its derivatives are electrically conducting upon doping. Although insoluble in water, its precursors can be manipulated in aqueous solution. The small optical band gap and its bright yellow fluorescence makes PPV a candidate in applications such as light-emitting diodes (LED) and photovoltaic devices. Moreover, PPV can be doped to form electrically conductive materials. Its physical and electronic properties can be altered by the inclusion of functional side groups.

== Preparation ==
PPVs can be synthesized by a variety of methods, the details of which determine purity and molecular weight. The most popular methods proceed via p-xylylene intermediates after a base induced elimination from α,α'-disubstituted para-xylenes.

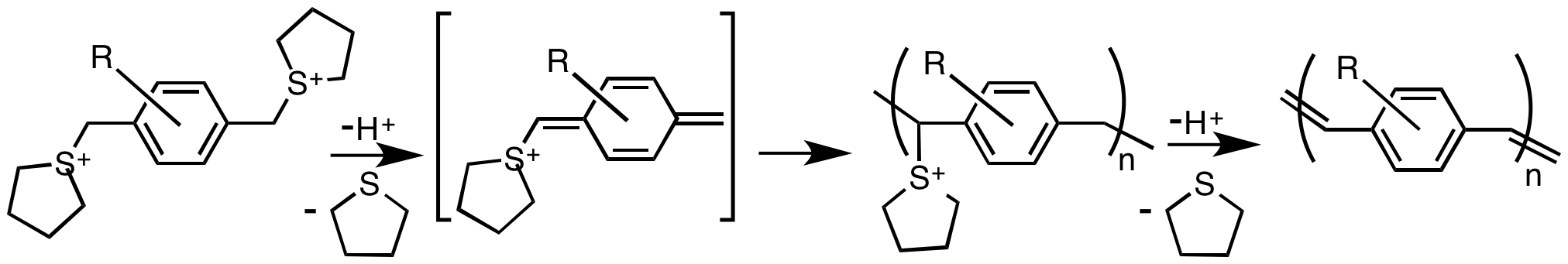

=== Other methods ===
Although xylylene-based routes dominate the synthetic methodology, many other routes have been evaluated.

==== Step growth routes ====
PPV can be synthesized by Wittig-type couplings between the bis(ylide) derived from an aromatic bisphosphonium salt and dialdehyde, especially 1,4-benzenedialdehyde.

Step growth coupling reactions, such as this Wittig condensation, usually yield low molecular weight oligomer with 5-10 repeat units. Incorporation of various side groups (alkyl, alkoxy, or phenyl) increases the solubility of the polymer and gives higher molecular weights. An advantage of the step-polymerization approach is that ortho-, meta-, and para-xylylene linkages can be incorporated in the main chain. Copolymers of defined stereoregularity can also be easily made in this way.

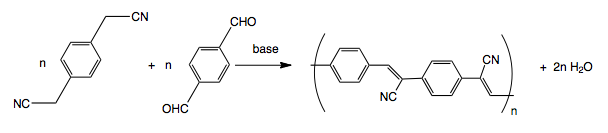
PPV derivatives can be also produced via the Knoevenagel condensation between a benzylic nitrile and an aromatic dialdehyde. Since this method produces many side reactions, such as hydrolysis of nitrile group, careful optimization of the reaction conditions was needed.

==== Heck coupling routes ====
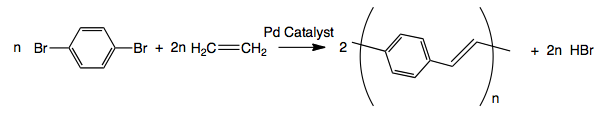
The couplings of ethylene with a variety of aromatic dibromides via a Heck reaction give reasonable molecular weights (3,000-10,000) when solubilizing groups present. However, this method requires one of the gaseous starting materials to be added in precise amounts, In excess polyethylene could be formed.

==== Ring-opening routes ====
A bicyclooctadiene compound has been coupled by ring-opening metathesis polymerization (ROMP) to give a precursor polymer of high molecular weight and soluble in organic solvents. This polymer can be deposited as thin films and converted thermally to PPV. Lower conversion temperatures could be employed with the presence of an amine catalyst.

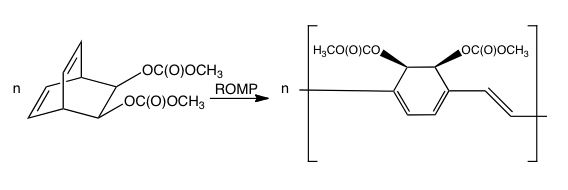
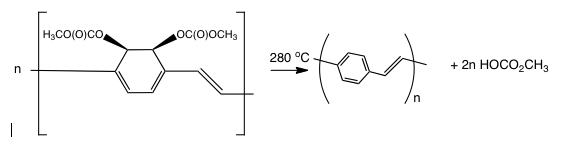

A modification of the ROMP route to PPV used a silyl-substituted paracyclophane derivative. Transformation into PPV could be achieved by elimination of the silyloxy group followed by thermal treatment or treating the precursor polymer with acid. The advantage of this method is that polymers and block copolymers of well-defined molecular weight can be easily prepared.

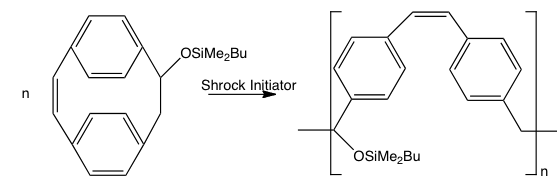
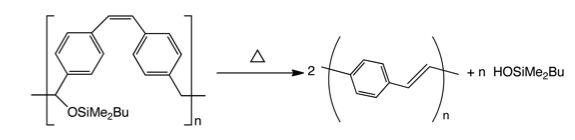

== Structure and properties ==
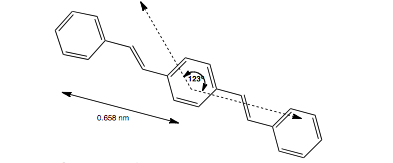
Highly oriented PPV films obtained by the soluble polymeric precursor route usually have P21 symmetry with a monoclinic unit cell containing two monomer units: c (chain axis) = 0.658, a = 0.790, b = 0.605 nm, and α (monoclinic angle) = 123o (Figure 1). The structural organization of PPV chains resembles that found in other highly oriented rigid-rod polymers, where the molecules are oriented along the fiber axis (often the stretching direction) but with partial axial translational disorder.

PPV is a diamagnetic material and has a very low intrinsic electrical conductivity, on the order of 10^{−13} S/cm. The electrical conductivity increases upon doping with iodine, ferric chloride, alkali metals, or acids. However, the stability of these doped materials is relatively low. In general, unaligned, unsubstituted PPV presents only moderate conductivity with doping, ranging from <<10^{−3} S/cm (I2 doped) to 100 S/cm (H_{2}SO_{4}-doped). Draw ratios of up to 10 are possible. Alkoxy-substituted PPVs are generally easier to oxidize than the parent PPV and hence have much higher conductivities. Longer side chains lower the conductivity and hinder interchain hopping of charge carriers.

== Aspirational uses ==
Due to its stability, processability, and electrical and optical properties, PPV has been considered for a wide variety of applications. In 1989 the first polymer-based light emitting diode (LED) was discovered using PPV as the emissive layer. Polymers are speculated to have advantages over molecular materials in LEDs, such as ease of processing, reduced tendency for crystallization, and greater thermal and mechanical stability. Ever since the first breakthrough in 1989, a large number of PPV derivatives have been synthesized and used for LED applications. Although solid-state lasing has yet to be demonstrated in an organic LED, poly[2-methoxy-5-(2'-ethylhexyloxy)-p-phenylene vinylene] (MEH-PPV) has been proven to be a promising laser dye due to its high fluorescence efficiency in solution.

Polyphenylene vinylene is electroluminescent, suggesting applications in polymer-based organic light emitting diodes. PPV was used as the emissive layer in the first polymer light-emitting diodes. Devices based on PPV emit yellow-green light, and derivatives of PPV obtained by substitution are often used when light of a different color is required. In presence of even a small amount of oxygen, singlet oxygen is formed during operation, by energy transfer from the excited polymer molecules to oxygen molecules. These oxygen radicals then attack the structure of the polymer, leading to its degradation.

PPV has also been investigated as an electron-donor in organic solar cells. PPV-based devices however suffer from poor absorption and photodegradation.
