= Organic electrochemical transistor =

Type of transistor

The organic electrochemical transistor (OECT) is an organic electronic device which functions like a transistor. The current flowing through the device is controlled by the exchange of ions between an electrolyte and the OECT channel composed of an organic conductor or semiconductor. The exchange of ions is driven by a voltage applied to the gate electrode which is in ionic contact with the channel through the electrolyte. The migration of ions between the channel and the electrolyte is accompanied by electrochemical redox reactions occurring in the channel material. The electrochemical redox of the channel along with ion migration changes the conductivity of the channel in a process called electrochemical doping. OECTs are being explored for applications in biosensors, bioelectronics and large-area, low-cost electronics. OECTs can also be used as multi-bit memory devices that mimic the synaptic functionalities of the brain. For this reason, OECTs can also be investigated as elements in neuromorphic computing applications.

== History of OECTs ==
Organic electrochemical transistors emerged in 1984, when White, Kittlesen, and Wrighton at MIT reported the first “molecule-based” transistor using gold electrodes coated with polypyrrole. By immersing the device in an electrolyte and applying a small voltage, they could switch the polymer between insulating and conducting states and amplify small chemical signals. At the time, this molecule-transistor had no practical application, but there was interest in combining microelectronic devices with chemical and biological systems for sensor applications.

Later in 1994, the first partially printed OECT functioned as a small electrochemical enzyme transistor, useful for detecting glucose and hydrogen peroxide. The use of PEDOT: PSS as a stable, printable, and highly conductive polymer also emerged during this period.

A decade later, researchers investigated the in-situ redox switching of PEDOT's electronic conductivity, and the first demonstrations of PEDOT-based transistors appeared in 2002. Because of their low operating voltage, OECTs are used in many applications, including health monitoring, biomarkers, neuromorphic computing, and even the monitoring and control of plant development.

== OECT device construction and operating mechanism ==
OECTs consist of a semiconductor or even conductor thin-film (the channel), usually made of a conjugated polymer, which is in direct contact with an electrolyte. Source and drain electrodes establish electrical contact to the channel, while a gate electrode establishes electrical contact to the electrolyte. The electrolyte can be liquid, gel, or solid. In the most common biasing configuration, the source is grounded and a voltage (drain voltage) is applied to the drain. This causes a current to flow (drain current), due to electronic charge (usually holes) present in the channel. When a voltage is applied to the gate, ions from the electrolyte are injected in the channel and change the electronic charge density, and hence the drain current. When the gate voltage is removed, the injected ions return to the electrolyte and the drain current goes back to its original value. However, some channel materials can hold the migrated ions even after removing the gate voltage enabling their use as memory devices.

OECTs commonly use PEDOT:PSS as the channel material, and work in the depletion mode. The organic semiconductor PEDOT is doped p-type by the sulfonate anions of present in PSS and hence PEDOT:PSS exhibits a high electronic conductivity. When no gate voltage is applied, a high drain current flows through the highly conductive channel, and the OECT is said to be in the ON state. When a positive voltage is applied to the gate, cations from the electrolyte are injected into the PEDOT:PSS channel, where they compensate the negative charge on the sulfonate anions. This leads to electrochemical reduction of PEDOT from its oxidised state to its neutral state resulting in de-doping of the OECT channel. The OECT is then said to be in the OFF state. Accumulation mode OECTs, based on intrinsic organic semiconductors (for example p(g2T-TT)), have also been described.

OECTs are different from electrolyte-gated field-effect transistors. In the latter type of device, ions do not penetrate into the channel, but rather accumulate near its surface (or near the surface of a dielectric layer, when such a layer is deposited on the channel). This induces accumulation of electronic charge inside the channel, near the surface. In contrast, in OECTs, ions are injected into the channel and change the electronic charge density throughout its entire volume. As a result of this bulk coupling between ionic and electronic charge, OECTs show a very high transconductance along with an outstanding intrinsic gain. The disadvantage of OECTs is that they are slow, as they are limited by the inherently slow migration of ions into and out of the channel. However, micro-fabricated OECTs show response times of the order of hundreds of microseconds. Accurate simulation of OECTs is possible using the drift-diffusion model.

OECTs are currently the focus of intense development for applications in bioelectronics, and in large-area, low-cost electronics. Advantages such as straightforward fabrication and miniaturization, compatibility with low-cost printing techniques, compatibility with a wide range of mechanical supports (including fibers, paper, plastic and elastomer), and stability in aqueous environments, led to their use in a variety of applications in biosensors. Moreover, their high transconductance makes OECTs powerful amplifying transducers. OECTs have been used to detect ions, neurotransmitters, metabolites, DNA, pathogenic organisms, as well as to probe cell adhesion, measure the integrity of barrier tissue, detect epileptic activity in rats, and interface with electrically active cells and tissues.

== Conducting Polymers Used for OECTs ==
Even though PEDOT: PSS is the most common polymer used in OECTs, researchers are looking into other conjugated polymers as possible materials for the channel. High-performance n-type semiconductors, such as BBL and naphthalene diimide-based copolymers like p(gNDI-g2T), have also been developed to improve the overall performance and functionality of OECT devices.

However, p-type polymers are more commonly used because n-type materials usually have problems with stability and performance. Injected electrons in n-type polymers can react with oxygen and water, resulting in charge trapping and degradation. Improving their stability usually means lowering the LUMO energy level. This can raise the threshold voltage and make the device less efficient. N-type polymers are also more sensitive to structural changes in the electrolyte, which can make charge transport slow.

In summary, PEDOT: PSS remains the main depletion mode material because easy to process in water, highly conductive, and compatible with biological tissue.
