= Substrate (materials science) =

Base material processing is conducted on

Substrate is a term used in materials science and engineering to describe the base material on which processing is conducted. Surfaces have different uses, including producing new film or layers of material and being a base to which another substance is bonded.

== Description ==
In materials science and engineering, a substrate refers to a base material on which processing is conducted. This surface could be used to produce new film or layers of material such as deposited coatings. It could be the base to which paint, adhesives, or adhesive tape is bonded.

A typical substrate might be rigid such as metal, concrete, or glass, onto which a coating might be deposited. Flexible substrates are also used. Some substrates are anisotropic with surface properties being different depending on the direction: examples include wood and paper products.

== Coatings ==
With all coating processes, the condition of the surface of the substrate can strongly affect the bond of subsequent layers. This can include cleanliness, smoothness, surface energy, moisture, etc.

Coating can be by a variety of processes, including:

- Adhesives and adhesive tapes
- Coating and printing processes
- Chemical vapor deposition and physical vapor deposition
- Conversion coating
  - Anodizing
  - Chromate conversion coating
  - Plasma electrolytic oxidation
  - Phosphate coating
- Paint
  - Enamel paint
  - Powder coating
  - Industrial coating
  - Silicate mineral paint
  - Fusion bonded epoxy coating (FBE coating)
- Pickled and oiled, a type of plate steel coating.
- Plating
  - Electroless plating
  - Electrochemical plating
- Polymer coatings, such as Teflon
- Sputtered or vacuum deposited materials
- Vitreous enamel

In optics, glass may be used as a substrate for an optical coating—either an antireflection coating to reduce reflection, or a mirror coating to enhance it. Ceramic substrates are also used in the renewable energy sector to produce inverters for photovoltaic solar systems and concentrators for concentrated photovoltaic systems.

A substrate may be also an engineered surface where an unintended or natural process occurs, like in:

- Fouling
- Corrosion
- Biofouling
- Heterogeneous catalysis
- Adsorption

== See also ==
- List of coating techniques
- Thin film
- Wetting
