= Polypyrrole =

Polymer

Polypyrrole

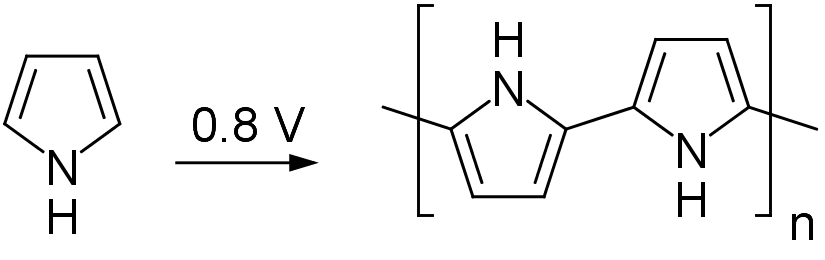
Pyrrole can be polymerised electrochemically.

Polypyrrole (PPy) is an organic polymer obtained by oxidative polymerization of pyrrole. It is a solid with the formula H(C_{4}H_{2}NH)_{n}H. It is an intrinsically conducting polymer, used in electronics, optical, biological and medical fields.

== History ==
Some of the first examples of PPy were reported in 1919 by Angeli and Pieroni, who reported the formation of pyrrole blacks from pyrrole magnesium bromide. Since then pyrrole oxidation reaction has been studied and reported in scientific literature.

Work on conductive polymers including polypyrrole, polythiophene, polyaniline, and polyacetylene was awarded the Nobel Prize in Chemistry in 2000 to Alan J. Heeger, Alan G. MacDiarmid and Hideki Shirakawa.

== Synthesis ==
Different methods can be used to synthesize PPy, but the most common are electrochemical synthesis and chemical oxidation.

Chemical oxidation of pyrrole:

n C_{4}H_{4}NH + 2n FeCl_{3} → (C_{4}H_{2}NH)_{n} + 2n FeCl_{2} + 2n HCl

The process is thought to occur via the formation of the pi-radical cation C_{4}H_{4}NH^{+}. This electrophile attacks the C-2 carbon of an unoxidized molecule of pyrrole to give a dimeric cation [(C_{4}H_{4}NH)_{2}]^{2+}. The process repeats itself many times.

Conductive forms of PPy are prepared by oxidation ("p-doping") of the polymer:

(C_{4}H_{2}NH)_{n} + 0.2 X → [(C_{4}H_{2}NH)_{n}X_{0.2}]

The polymerization and p-doping can also be effected electrochemically. The resulting conductive polymer are peeled off of the anode. Cyclic voltammetry and chronocoulometry methods can be used for electrochemical synthesis of polypyrrole.

Most recent micro and nano droplet researches have been conducted in the synthesis of polypyrrole microstructures using various fluid templates formed on different solid surfaces.

== Properties ==
Films of PPy are yellow but darken in the air due to some oxidation. Doped films are blue or black depending on the degree of polymerization and film thickness. They are amorphous, showing only weak diffraction. PPy is described as "quasi-unidimensional" vs one-dimensional since there is some crosslinking and chain hopping. Undoped and doped films are insoluble in solvents but swellable. Doping makes the materials brittle. They are stable in the air up to 150 °C at which temperature the dopant starts to evolve (e.g., as HCl).

Doping the polymer requires that the material swell to accommodate the charge-compensating anions. The physical changes associated with this charging and discharging have been discussed as a form of artificial muscle. The surface of polypyrrole films present fractal properties and ionic diffusion through them show anomalous diffusion pattern.

== Applications ==
PPy and related conductive polymers have two main application in electronic devices and for chemical sensors and electrochemical applications.

== Research trends ==
PPy is a potential vehicle for drug delivery. The polymer matrix serves as a container for proteins.

Polypyrrole has been investigated as a catalyst support for fuel cells and to sensitize cathode electrocatalysts.

Together with other conjugated polymers such as polyaniline, poly(ethylenedioxythiophene) etc., polypyrrole has been studied as a material for "artificial muscles", a technology that offers advantages relative to traditional motor actuating elements.

Polypyrrole was used to coat silica and reverse phase silica to yield a material capable of anion exchange and exhibiting hydrophobic interactions.

Polypyrrole was used in the microwave fabrication of multiwalled carbon nanotubes, a rapid method to grow CNT's.

A water-resistant polyurethane sponge coated with a thin layer of polypyrrole absorbs 20 times its weight in oil and is reusable.

The wet-spun polypyrrole fibre can be prepared chemical polymerization pyrrole and DEHS as dopant.

Polypyrrole is often used as a coating material to accelerate synthetic mimics of cosmic dust into impact ionisation mass spectrometers, which are used on space missions to analyse the composition of their parent bodies.

== See also ==
- Organic semiconductor
- Tetrapyrroles
