= Poly(3,4-ethylenedioxythiophene) =

Conductive polymer

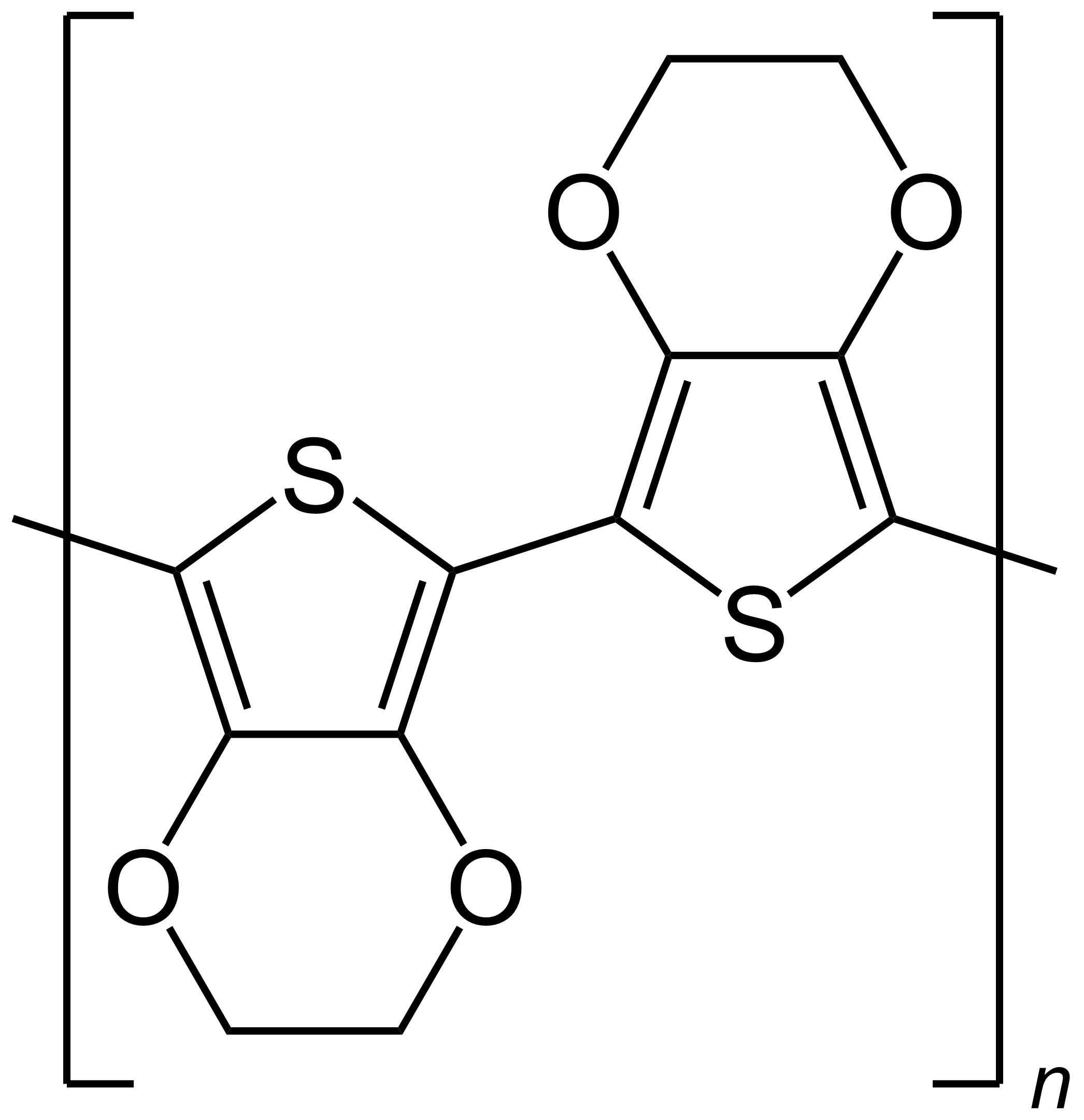
PEDOT

Poly(3,4-ethylenedioxythiophene) (PEDOT or PEDT; IUPAC name poly(2,3-dihydrothieno[3,4-b][1,4]dioxane-5,7-diyl)) is a conducting polymer based on 3,4-ethylenedioxythiophene or EDOT. It was first reported by Bayer AG in 1989.

== Polymer ==
PEDOT possesses many advantageous properties compared to earlier conducting polythiophenes like 3-alkylthiophenes. For example, the polymer is optically transparent in its conducting state and has high stability, moderate band gap, and low redox potential. Its major disadvantage is its poor solubility, which is partly circumvented by use of composite materials such as PEDOT:PSS and PEDOT-TMA.

The polymer is generated by oxidation. The process begins with production of the radical cation of EDOT monomer, [C_{2}H_{4}O_{2}C_{4}H_{2}S]^{+}. This cation adds to a neutral EDOT followed by deprotonation. The idealized conversion using peroxydisulfate is shown:

n C_{2}H_{4}O_{2}C_{4}H_{2}S + n (OSO_{3})_{2}^{2−} → [C_{2}H_{4}O_{2}C_{4}S]_{n} + 2n HOSO_{3}^{−}

Polymerization is usually conducted in the presence of polystyrene sulfonate (PSS), which acts as a template. PSS also provides a counter ion, which balances the charges in the reaction and hinders the formation of by-products such as 3,4-ethylenedioxy-2(5H)-thiophenone, and keeps the PEDOT monomers dispersed in water or aqueous solutions. The resulting PEDOT:PSS composite can be deposited on a conductive support such as platinum, gold, glassy carbon, and indium tin oxide.

== Uses ==
Applications of PEDOT include electrochromic displays and antistatics. PEDOT has also been proposed for photovoltaics, printed wiring, and sensors. PEDOT has been proposed for use in biocompatible interfaces.

Enhanced PEDOT's conductivity and surface area, making it a promising material for supercapacitors. Researchers at UCLA developed a nanofiber structure using a vapor-phase growth process, increasing its charge storage capacity nearly tenfold compared to conventional PEDOT. This new structure exhibited 100 times higher conductivity, a fourfold increase in surface area, and a charge storage capacity of 4600 mF/cm², while maintaining exceptional durability with over 70,000 charge cycles. These improvements enabled faster charging, greater efficiency, and longer lifespan, positioning PEDOT as a strong candidate for next-generation energy storage in renewable energy systems and electric vehicles.
