= PEDOT:PSS =

Polymer

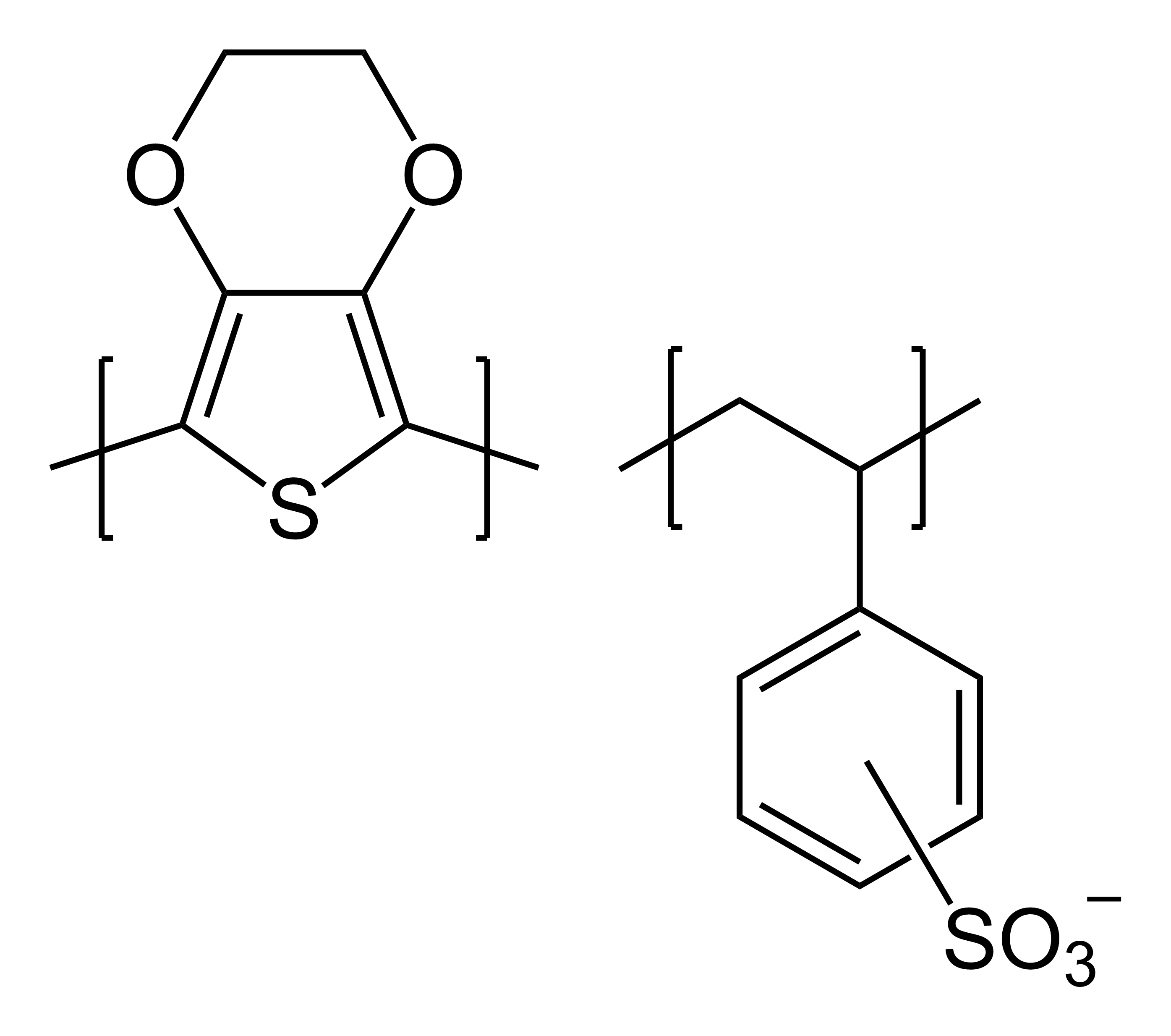
PEDOT:PSS

Electrochromic switching in two PEDOT:PSS electrodes connected by a piece of PhastGel SDS buffer strips. The electrodes were reversibly and repeatedly oxidized and reduced by switching the polarity of an applied 1 V potential. This was observed by a color change between dark (reduced PEDOT) and light (oxidized PEDOT) blue within the electrodes, demonstrating the transport of ions between and into the electrodes.

Poly(3,4-ethylenedioxythiophene) polystyrene sulfonate (PEDOT:PSS) is a composite material where PEDOT (the conductive polymer) provides electrical conductivity, and PSS (polystyrene sulfonate) acts as a counter-ion to balance the charge and improve the water solubility and processability of PEDOT. Polystyrene sulfonate is a sulfonated polystyrene. Part of the sulfonyl groups are deprotonated and carry a negative charge. The other component poly(3,4-ethylenedioxythiophene) (PEDOT) is a conjugated polymer and carries positive charges and is based on polythiophene. Together the charged macromolecules form a macromolecular salt.

== Synthesis ==
PEDOT:PSS can be prepared by mixing an aqueous solution of PSS with EDOT monomer, and to the resulting mixture, a solution of sodium persulfate and ferric sulfate. The addition of these reagents initiates the oxidative chemical polymerization of EDOT in water to form PEDOT. The stabilizing PSS forms a shell around a core of PEDOT in a nano-sized structure. The negatively charged sulfonic acid ions help stabilize the positively charged PEDOT ions.

== Applications ==
PEDOT:PSS has the highest efficiency among conductive organic thermoelectric materials (ZT~0.42) and thus can be used in flexible thermoelectric generators. Yet its largest application is as a transparent, conductive polymer with high ductility. For example, AGFA coats 200 million photographic films per year with a thin, extensively-stretched layer of virtually transparent and colorless PEDOT:PSS as an antistatic agent to prevent electrostatic discharges during production and normal film use, independent of humidity conditions, and as electrolyte in polymer electrolytic capacitors. PEDOT:PSS is commonly used in organic light emitting diode (OLED) and organic solar cell for hole injection or hole extraction to improve carrier transport.

If organic compounds, including high boiling solvents like methylpyrrolidone, dimethyl sulfoxide, sorbitol, ionic liquids and surfactants, are added conductivity increases by many orders of magnitude. This makes it also suitable as a transparent electrode, for example in touchscreens, organic light-emitting diodes, flexible organic solar cells and electronic paper to replace the traditionally used indium tin oxide (ITO). Owing to the high conductivity (up to 4600 S/cm), it can be used as a cathode material in capacitors replacing manganese dioxide or liquid electrolytes. It is also used in organic electrochemical transistors.

The conductivity of PEDOT:PSS can also be significantly improved by a post-treatment with various compounds, such as ethylene glycol, dimethyl sulfoxide (DMSO), salts, zwitterions, cosolvents, acids, alcohols, phenol, geminal diols and amphiphilic fluoro-compounds. This conductivity is comparable to that of ITO, the popular transparent electrode material, and it can triple that of ITO after a network of carbon nanotubes and silver nanowires is embedded into PEDOT:PSS and used for flexible organic devices.

PEDOT:PSS is generally applied as a dispersion of gelled particles in water. A conductive layer on glass is obtained by spreading a layer of the dispersion on the surface usually by spin coating and driving out the water by heat. Special PEDOT:PSS inks and formulations were developed for different coating and printing processes. Water-based PEDOT:PSS inks are mainly used in slot die coating, flexography, rotogravure and inkjet printing. If a high viscous paste and slow drying is required like in screen-printing processes PEDOT:PSS can also be supplied in high boiling solvents like propanediol. Dry PEDOT:PSS pellets can be produced with a freeze drying method which are redispersible in water and different solvents, for example ethanol to increase drying speed during printing. Finally, to overcome degradation to ultraviolet light and high temperature or humidity conditions PEDOT:PSS UV-stabilizers are available. Linköping University claim to have made a "wooden transistor" by replacing the lignin from balsawood with PEDOT:PSS

== Mechanical Properties ==
Since PEDOT:PSS is most frequently used in thin film architectures, several methods have been developed to accurately probe its mechanical properties; for example, water-supported tensile testing, four-point bend tests to measure adhesive and cohesive fracture energy, buckling tests to measure modulus, and bending tests on PDMS and polyethylene supports to probe the crack onset strain. Though PEDOT:PSS has a lower electrical mobility than silicon, which can also be incorporated into flexible electronics through the incorporation of stress-relief structures, sufficiently flexible PEDOT:PSS can enable lower cost-processing, such as roll-to-roll processing. The most important characteristics for an organic semiconductor used in thin-film architectures are low modulus in the elastic regime and high stretchability prior to fracture. These properties have been found to be highly correlated to relative humidity. At high relative humidity (>40%) hydrogen bonds are weakened in the PSS due to the uptake of water which leads to higher strain before fracture and lower elastic modulus. At low relative humidity (<23%) the presence of strong bonding between PSS grains leads to higher modulus and lower strain before fracture. Films at higher relative humidity are presumed to fail by intergranular fracture, whereas lower relative humidity leads to transgranular fracture. Additives like 3-glycidoxypropyltrimethoxysilane (GOPS) can drastically improve the mechanical stability in aqueous media even at low concentrations of 1 wt% without significantly impeding the electrical properties.

PEDOT:PSS can also show self-healing properties if submerged in water after sustaining mechanical damage. This self-healing capability is proposed to be enabled by the hygroscopic property of PSS^{−}. Common PEDOT:PSS additives that improve the electrical conductivity have varying effects on self-healing. While ethylene glycol improves electrical and mechanical self-healing, sulfuric acid reduces the former but improves the latter, presumably because it undergoes autoprotolysis. Polyethylene glycol improves the electrical and thermoelectric self-healing, but reduces the mechanical self-healing.

PEDOT:PSS is also attractive for conductive textile applications. Though it results in inferior thermoelectric properties, wet-spinning has been shown to result in high conductivity and stiff fibers due to preferential alignment of polymer chains during fiber drawing.
