= MTSL =

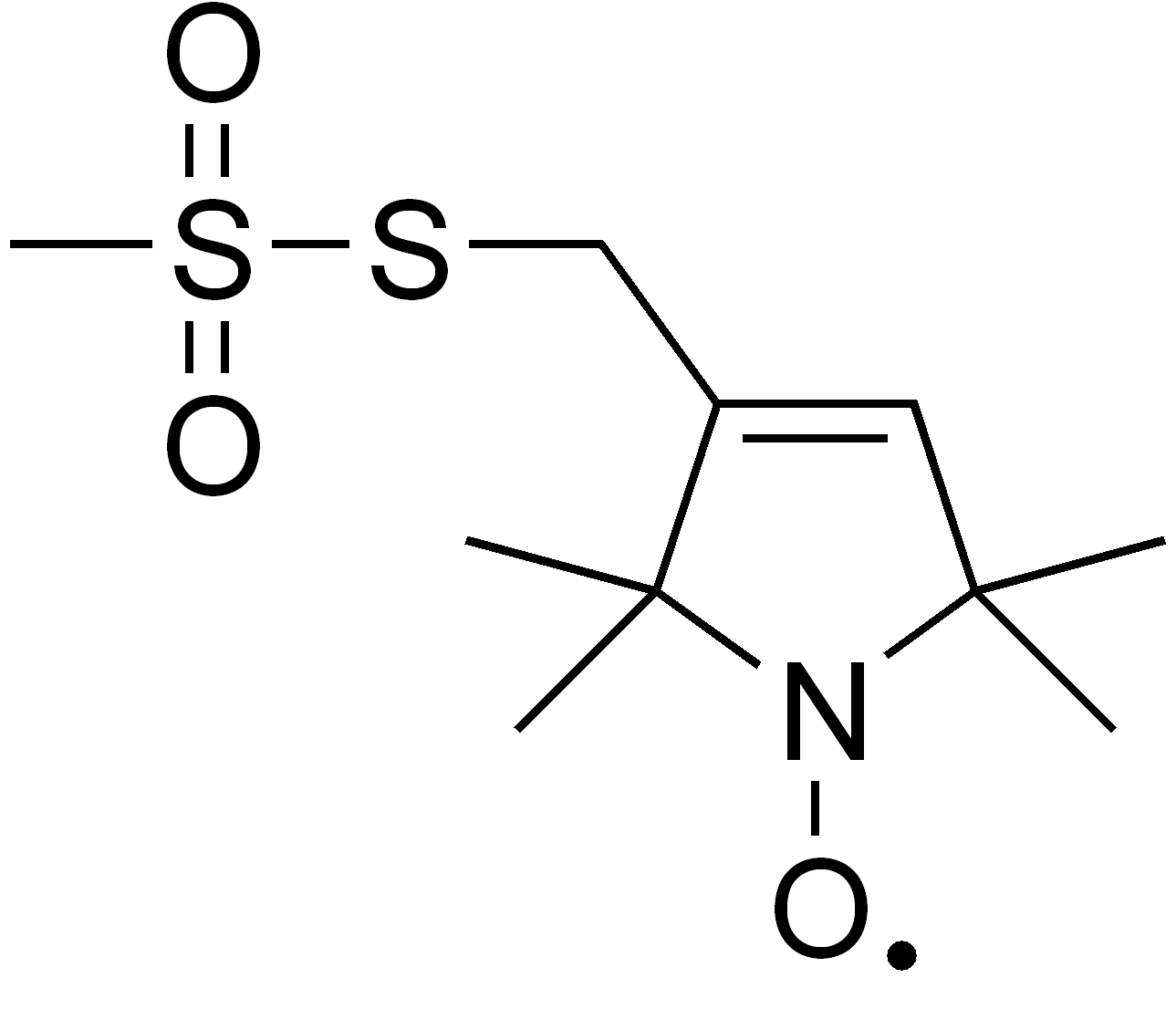

Names
- Preferred IUPAC name {2,2,5,5-Tetramethyl-3-[(2-methyl-2,2-dioxo-2λ^{6}-disulfan-1-yl)methyl]-2,5-dihydro-1H-pyrrol-1-yl}oxyl
- Other names MTSL

Identifiers
| CAS Number | 81213-52-7 |
| 3D model (JSmol) | Interactive image |
| ChemSpider | 117873 |
| PubChem CID | 133628 |
| CompTox Dashboard (EPA) | DTXSID80230944 |
- InChI: InChI=1S/C10H18NO3S2/c1-9(2)6-8(7-15-16(5,13)14)10(3,4)11(9)12/h6H,7H2,1-5H3 Key: BLSCGBLQCTWVPO-UHFFFAOYSA-N; InChI=1/C10H18NO3S2/c1-9(2)6-8(7-15-16(5,13)14)10(3,4)11(9)12/h6H,7H2,1-5H3 Key: BLSCGBLQCTWVPO-UHFFFAOYAW
- SMILES: CC1(C=C(C(N1[O])(C)C)CSS(=O)(=O)C)C

Properties
| Chemical formula | C_{10}H_{18}NO_{3}S_{2} |
| Molar mass | 264.38 g·mol^{−1} |
- Except where otherwise noted, data are given for materials in their standard state (at 25 °C [77 °F], 100 kPa). verify (what is ?) Infobox references

MTSL (S-(1-oxyl-2,2,5,5-tetramethyl-2,5-dihydro-1H-pyrrol-3-yl)methyl methanesulfonothioate) is an organosulfur compound that is used as a nitroxide spin label. MTSL is bifunctional, consisting of the nitroxide and the thiosulfonate ester functional groups. The nitroxide label is sterically protected, so it is relatively unreactive.

== Labeling ==
MTSL is attached to proteins by reaction with thiol groups. The reaction exploits standard reactivity of thiosulfate esters. Methanesulfinate (CH_{3}SO_{2}^{−}) is the leaving group:

RSO_{2}S-nitroxide + protein-SH → protein-S-S-nitroxide + RSO_{2}H

The heterodisulfide bond to the cysteine residue is robust, enabling site-directed spin labelling. The MTSL moiety will add 184.3 daltons to the mass of the protein or peptide to which it is attached. The cysteine can be introduced using site-directed mutagenesis, and hence most positions in a protein can be labelled.

== Spectroscopy ==
In Nuclear magnetic resonance the introduction of the paramagnetic group increases the relaxation rate of nearby nuclei. Its presence can be detected as peak broadening and loss of intensity in peaks corresponding to nearby nuclei. Hence proximity can be inferred for all nuclei, that are affected. A major advantage of this method over traditional methods for obtaining distance restraints in protein NMR is the increased length, as paramagnetic relaxation enhancement can detect distances up to 25 Å (2.5 nm) as opposed to about 6 Å (0.6 nm) using the nuclear Overhauser effect. Spin labelling with MTSL is frequently used in investigation of residual structure in intrinsically unstructured proteins.
