= 3,4-Ethylenedioxythiophene =

Names
- Preferred IUPAC name 2,3-Dihydrothieno[3,4-b][1,4]dioxine

Identifiers
CAS Number	126213-50-1
3D model (JSmol)	Interactive image
Beilstein Reference	7126466
ChemSpider	3622202
ECHA InfoCard	100.122.178
EC Number	603-128-0
PubChem CID	4421864
UNII	8SEC7Q2K7G
CompTox Dashboard (EPA)	DTXSID301047399 DTXSID40888925, DTXSID301047399
- InChI: InChI=1S/C6H6O2S/c1-2-8-6-4-9-3-5(6)7-1/h3-4H,1-2H2 Key: GKWLILHTTGWKLQ-UHFFFAOYSA-N
- SMILES: C1COC2=CSC=C2O1

Properties
Chemical formula	C_{6}H_{6}O_{2}S
Molar mass	142.17 g·mol^{−1}
Appearance	colorless liquid
Density	1.34 g/cm^{3}
Melting point	10.5 °C (50.9 °F; 283.6 K)
Boiling point	225 °C (437 °F; 498 K)
Solubility in water	2.1 g/L
Viscosity	11 mPa·s

Hazards
- GHS labelling
Pictograms	(GHS06: Toxic) (GHS07: Exclamation mark)
Signal word	Danger
Hazard statements	H302, H311, H312, H319, H412
Precautionary statements	P262, P264, P264+P265, P270, P273, P280, P301+P317, P302+P352, P305+P351+P338, P316, P317, P321, P330, P337+P317, P361+P364, P362+P364, P405, P501
Flash point	104 °C (219 °F; 377 K)
Autoignition temperature	360 °C (680 °F; 633 K)
- Except where otherwise noted, data are given for materials in their standard state (at 25 °C [77 °F], 100 kPa). Infobox references

3,4-Ethylenedioxythiophene (EDOT) is an organosulfur compound with the formula C_{2}H_{4}O_{2}C_{4}H_{2}S. The molecule consists of thiophene, substituted at the 3 and 4 positions with an ethylene glycolyl unit. It is a colorless viscous liquid.

EDOT is the precursor to the polymer PEDOT, which is found in electrochromic displays, photovoltaics, electroluminescent displays, printed wiring, and sensors.

== Synthesis and polymerization ==
The original synthesis proceeded via the diester of 3,4-dihydroxythiophene-2,5-dicarboxylate.

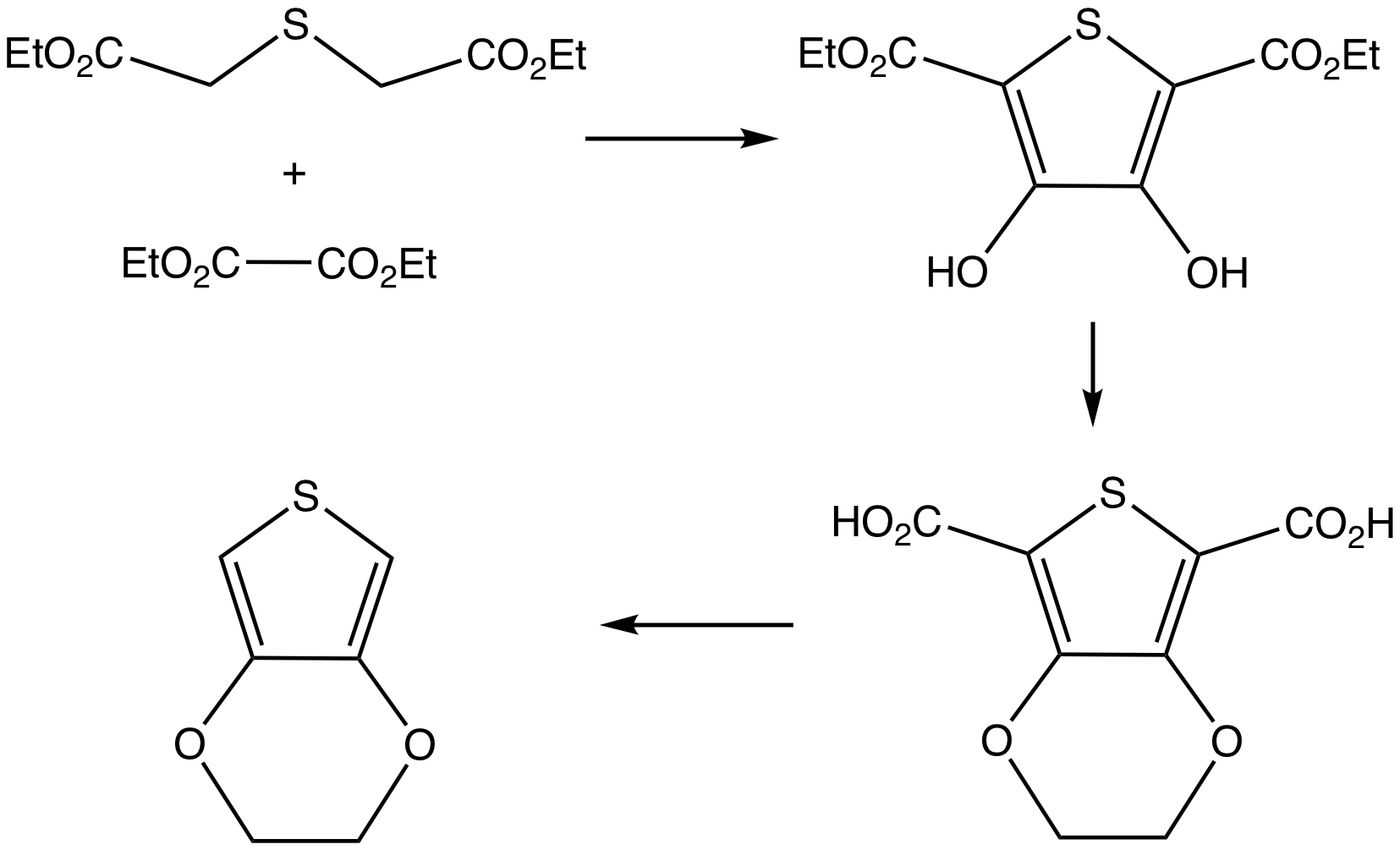
One synthesis of EDOT

EDOT is often prepared from C4 precursors such as butanediol and butadiene via routes that produce the thiophene and dioxane rings in separate steps. Representative is the reaction of 2,3-butanedione, trimethyl orthoformate, and ethylene glycol to form the dioxane. Sulfidization with elemental sulfur gives the bicyclic target.

EDOT is converted into the conducting polymer PEDOT by oxidation. The mechanism for this conversion begins with production of the radical cation [EDOT]^{+}, which attacks a neutral EDOT molecule followed by deprotonation. Further similar steps result in the dehydropolymerization. The idealized conversion using peroxydisulfate is shown

n C_{2}H_{4}O_{2}C_{4}H_{2}S + n (OSO_{3})_{2}^{2−} → [C_{2}H_{4}O_{2}C_{4}S]_{n} + 2n HOSO_{3}^{−}

For commercial purposes, the polymerization is conducted in the presence of polystyrene sulfonate.
