= Polythiophene =

Organic Polymer

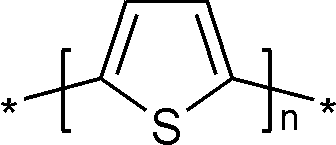
The monomer repeat unit of unsubstituted polythiophene.

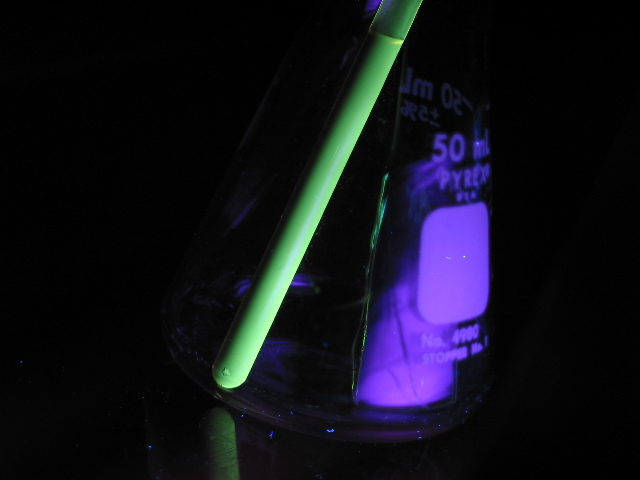
Polythiophenes demonstrate interesting optical properties resulting from their conjugated backbone, as demonstrated by the fluorescence of a substituted polythiophene solution under UV irradiation.

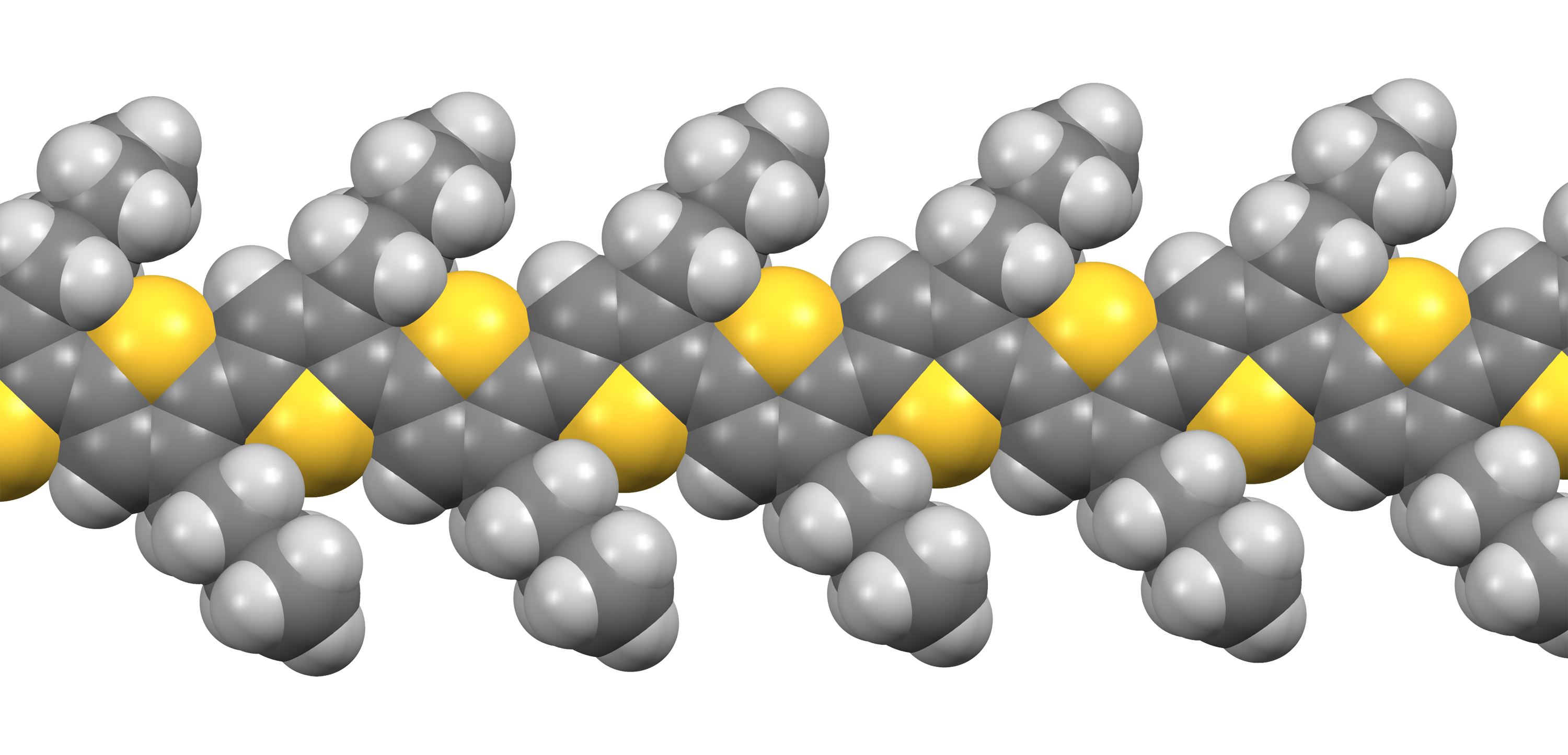
Space-filling model of poly(3-butylthiophene) from the crystal structure.

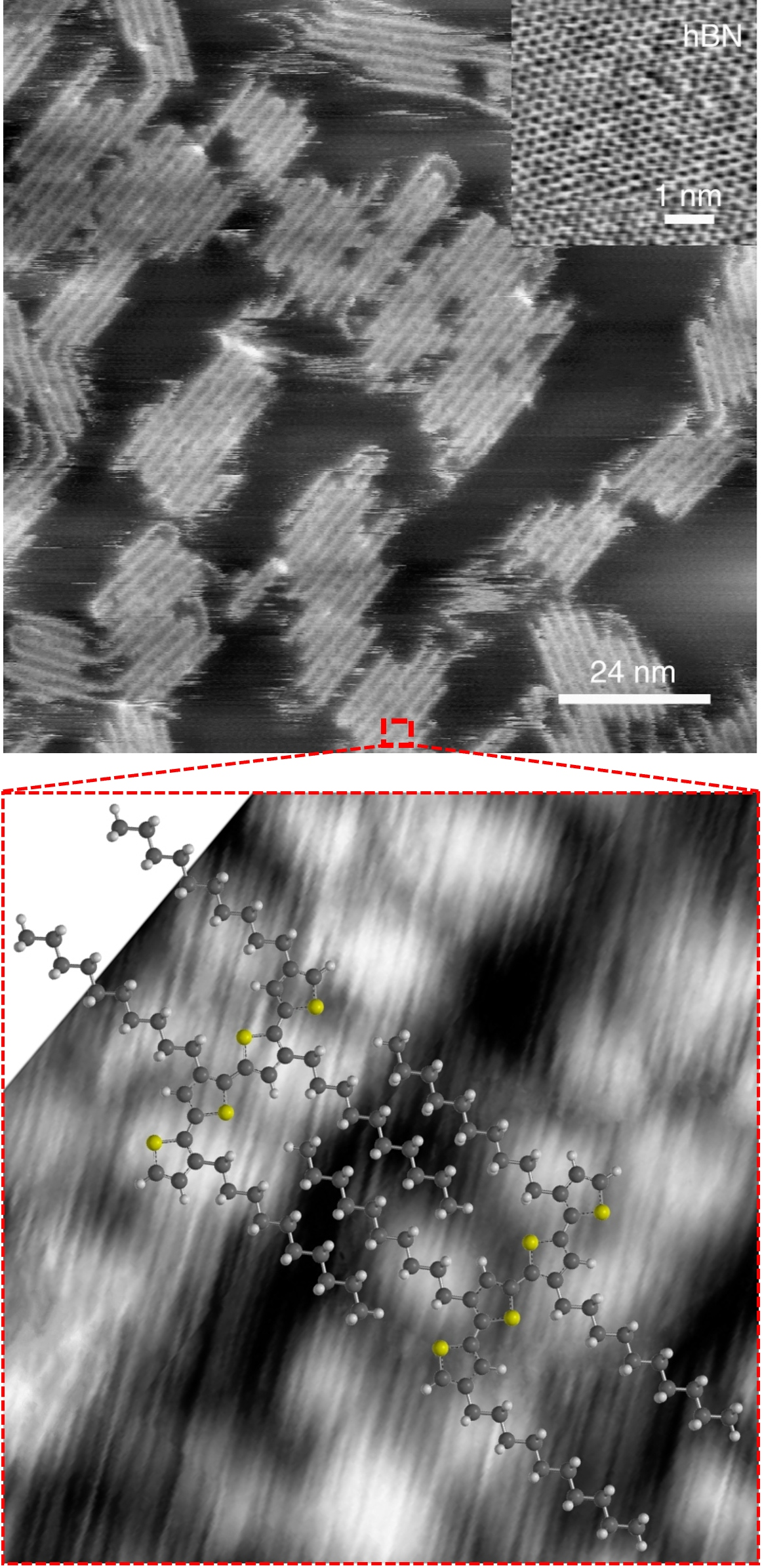
AFM image of poly(3-decylthiophene-2,5-diyl) on hexagonal boron nitride (top-right inset).

Polythiophenes (PTs) are polymerized thiophenes, a sulfur heterocycle. The parent PT is an insoluble colored solid with the formula (C_{4}H_{2}S)_{n}. (Note: Strictly speaking, "polythiophene" is a misnomer, since the polymer consists of thienylene (2,5-C_{4}H_{2}S) repeat units. Similarly, thiophene is not a monomer as such.) The rings are linked through the 2- and 5-positions. Poly(alkylthiophene)s have alkyl substituents at the 3- or 4-position(s). They are also colored solids, but tend to be soluble in organic solvents.

PTs become conductive when oxidized. The electrical conductivity results from the delocalization of electrons along the polymer backbone. Conductivity however is not the only interesting property resulting from electron delocalization. The optical properties of these materials respond to environmental stimuli, with dramatic color shifts in response to changes in solvent, temperature, applied potential, and binding to other molecules. Changes in both color and conductivity are induced by the same mechanism, twisting of the polymer backbone and disrupting conjugation, making conjugated polymers attractive as sensors that can provide a range of optical and electronic responses.

The development of polythiophenes and related conductive organic polymers was recognized by the awarding of the 2000 Nobel Prize in Chemistry to Alan J. Heeger, Alan MacDiarmid, and Hideki Shirakawa "for the discovery and development of conductive polymers".

== Mechanism of conductivity and doping ==
PT is an ordinary organic polymer, being a red solid that is poorly soluble in most solvents. Upon treatment with oxidizing agents (electron-acceptors) however, the material takes on a dark color and becomes electrically conductive. Oxidation is referred to as "doping". Around 0.2 equivalent of oxidant is used to convert PTs (and other conducting polymers) into the optimally conductive state. Thus about one of every five rings is oxidized. Many different oxidants are used. Because of the redox reaction, the conductive form of polythiophene is a salt. An idealized stoichiometry is shown using the oxidant [A]PF_{6}:

(C_{4}H_{2}S)_{n} + 1/5n [A]PF_{6} → (C_{4}H_{2}S)_{n}(PF_{6})_{0.2n} + 1/5 nA

In principle, PT can be n-doped using reducing agents, but this approach is rarely practiced.

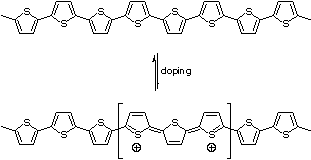
Removal of two electrons (p-doping) from a PT chain produces a bipolaron.

Upon "p-doping", charged unit called a bipolaron is formed. The bipolaron moves as a unit along the polymer chain and is responsible for the macroscopically observed conductivity of the material. Conductivity can approach 1000 S/cm. In comparison, the conductivity of copper is approximately 5×10^{5} S/cm. Generally, the conductivity of PTs is lower than 1000 S/cm, but high conductivity is not necessary for many applications, e.g. as an antistatic film.

=== Oxidants ===
A variety of reagents have been used to dope PTs. Iodine and bromine produce highly conductive materials, which are unstable owing to slow evaporation of the halogen. Organic acids, including trifluoroacetic acid, propionic acid, and sulfonic acids produce PTs with lower conductivities than iodine, but with higher environmental stabilities. Oxidative polymerization with ferric chloride can result in doping by residual catalyst, although matrix-assisted laser desorption/ionization mass spectrometry (MALDI-MS) studies have shown that poly(3-hexylthiophene)s are also partially halogenated by the residual oxidizing agent. Poly(3-octylthiophene) dissolved in toluene can be doped by solutions of ferric chloride hexahydrate dissolved in acetonitrile, and can be cast into films with conductivities reaching 1 S/cm. Other, less common p-dopants include gold trichloride and trifluoromethanesulfonic acid.

== Structure and optical properties ==
=== Conjugation length ===
The extended π-systems of conjugated PTs produce some of the most interesting properties of these materials—their optical properties. As an approximation, the conjugated backbone can be considered as a real-world example of the "electron-in-a-box" solution to the Schrödinger equation; however, the development of refined models to accurately predict absorption and fluorescence spectra of well-defined oligo(thiophene) systems is ongoing. Conjugation relies upon overlap of the π-orbitals of the aromatic rings, which, in turn, requires the thiophene rings to be coplanar.

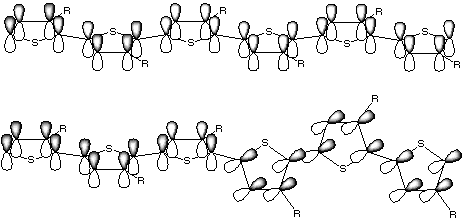
Conjugated π-orbitals of a coplanar and a twisted substituted PT.

The number of coplanar rings determines the conjugation length—the longer the conjugation length, the lower the separation between adjacent energy levels, and the longer the absorption wavelength. Deviation from coplanarity may be permanent, resulting from mislinkages during synthesis or especially bulky side chains; or temporary, resulting from changes in the environment or binding. This twist in the backbone reduces the conjugation length, and the separation between energy levels is increased. This results in a shorter absorption wavelength.

Determining the maximum effective conjugation length requires the synthesis of regioregular PTs of defined length. The absorption band in the visible region is increasingly red-shifted as the conjugation length increases, and the maximum effective conjugation length is calculated as the saturation point of the red-shift. Early studies by ten Hoeve et al. estimated that the effective conjugation extended over 11 repeat units, while later studies increased this estimate to 20 units. Using the absorbance and emission profile of discrete conjugated oligo(3-hexylthiophene)s prepared through polymerization and separation, Lawrence et al. determined the effective conjugation length of poly(3-hexylthiophene) to be 14 units. The effective conjugation length of polythiophene derivatives depend on the chemical structure of side chains, and thiophene backbones.

The absorption band of poly (3-thiophene acetic acid) in aqueous solutions of poly(vinyl alcohol) (PVA) shifts from 480 nm at pH 7 to 415 nm at pH 4. This is attributed to formation of a compact coil structure, which can form hydrogen bonds with PVA upon partial deprotonation of the acetic acid group.

Shifts in PT absorption bands due to changes in temperature result from a conformational transition from a coplanar, rodlike structure at lower temperatures to a nonplanar, coiled structure at elevated temperatures. For example, poly(3-(octyloxy)-4-methylthiophene) undergoes a color change from red–violet at 25 °C to pale yellow at 150 °C. An isosbestic point (a point where the absorbance curves at all temperatures overlap) indicates coexistence between two phases, which may exist on the same chain or on different chains. Not all thermochromic PTs exhibit an isosbestic point: highly regioregular poly(3-alkylthiophene)s (PATs) show a continuous blue-shift with increasing temperature if the side chains are short enough so that they do not melt and interconvert between crystalline and disordered phases at low temperatures.

=== Optical effects ===
The optical properties of PTs can be sensitive to many factors. PTs exhibit absorption shifts due to application of electric potentials (electrochromism), or to introduction of alkali ions (ionochromism). Soluble PATs exhibit both thermochromism and solvatochromism (see above) in chloroform and 2,5-dimethyltetrahydrofuran.

Ionoselective PTs reported by Bäuerle (left) and Swager (right).

== Substituted polythiophenes ==
Polythiophene and its oxidized derivatives have poor processing properties. They are insoluble in ordinary solvents and do not melt readily. For example, doped unsubstituted PTs are only soluble in exotic solvents such as arsenic trifluoride and arsenic pentafluoride. Although only poorly processable, "the expected high temperature stability and potentially very high electrical conductivity of PT films (if made) still make it a highly desirable material." Nonetheless, intense interest has focused on soluble polythiophenes, which usually translates to polymers derived from 3-alkylthiophenes, which give the so-called polyalkylthiophenes (PATs).

=== 3-Alkylthiophenes ===
Soluble polymers are derivable from 3-substituted thiophenes where the 3-substituent is butyl or longer. Copolymers also are soluble, e.g., poly(3-methylthiophene-'co'-3'-octylthiophene).

The four possible triads resulting from coupling of 3-substituted thiophenes.

One undesirable feature of 3-alkylthiophenes is the variable regioregularity of the polymer. Focusing on the polymer microstructure at the dyad level, 3-substituted thiophenes can couple to give any of three dyads:

- 2,5', or head–tail (HT), coupling
- 2,2', or head–head (HH), coupling
- 5,5', or tail–tail (TT), coupling

These three diads can be combined into four distinct triads. The triads are distinguishable by NMR spectroscopy.

Regioregularity affects the properties of PTs. A regiorandom copolymer of 3-methylthiophene and 3-butylthiophene possessed a conductivity of 50 S/cm, whereas a more regioregular copolymer with a 2:1 ratio of HT to HH couplings had a higher conductivity of 140 S/cm. Films of regioregular poly(3-(4-octylphenyl)thiophene) (POPT) with greater than 94% HT content possessed conductivities of 4 S/cm, compared with 0.4 S/cm for regioirregular POPT. PATs prepared using Rieke zinc formed "crystalline, flexible, and bronze-colored films with a metallic luster". On the other hand, the corresponding regiorandom polymers produced "amorphous and orange-colored films". Comparison of the thermochromic properties of the Rieke PATs showed that, while the regioregular polymers showed strong thermochromic effects, the absorbance spectra of the regioirregular polymers did not change significantly at elevated temperatures. Finally, Fluorescence absorption and emission maxima of poly(3-hexylthiophene)s occur at increasingly lower wavelengths (higher energy) with increasing HH dyad content. The difference between absorption and emission maxima, the Stokes shift, also increases with HH dyad content, which they attributed to greater relief from conformational strain in the first excited state.

=== Special substituents ===
Water-soluble PT's are represented by sodium poly(3-thiophenealkanesulfonate)s. In addition to conferring water solubility, the pendant sulfonate groups act as counterions, producing self-doped conducting polymers. Substituted PTs with tethered carboxylic acids also exhibit water solubility. and urethanes

Thiophenes with chiral substituents at the 3 position have been polymerized. Such chiral PTs in principle could be employed for detection or separation of chiral analytes.

Poly(3-(perfluorooctyl)thiophene)s is soluble in supercritical carbon dioxide Oligothiophenes capped at both ends with thermally-labile alkyl esters were cast as films from solution, and then heated to remove the solublizing end groups. Atomic force microscopy (AFM) images showed a significant increase in long-range order after heating.

Fluorinated polythiophene yield 7% efficiency in polymer-fullerene solar cells.

=== PEDOT ===
The 3,4-disubstituted thiophene called ethylenedioxythiophene (EDOT) is the precursor to the polymer PEDOT. Regiochemistry is not an issue in since this monomer is symmetrical. PEDOT is found in electrochromic displays, photovoltaics, electroluminescent displays, printed wiring, and sensors.

== Synthesis ==
=== Electrochemical synthesis ===
In an electrochemical polymerization, a solution containing thiophene and an electrolyte produces a conductive PT film on the anode. Electrochemical polymerization is convenient, since the polymer does not need to be isolated and purified, but it can produce polymers with undesirable alpha-beta linkages and varying degrees of regioregularity. The stoichiometry of the electropolymerization is:

n C_{4}H_{4}S → (C_{4}H_{2}S)_{n} + 2n H^{+} + 2n e^{−}

Proposed initial steps in the electropolymerization of thiophenes.

The degree of polymerization and quality of the resulting polymer depends upon the electrode material, current density, temperature, solvent, electrolyte, presence of water, and monomer concentration.

Electron-donating substituents lower the oxidation potential, whereas electron-withdrawing groups increase the oxidation potential. Thus, 3-methylthiophene polymerizes in acetonitrile and tetrabutylammonium tetrafluoroborate at a potential of about 1.5 V vs. SCE, whereas unsubstituted thiophene requires an additional 0.2 V. Steric hindrance resulting from branching at the α-carbon of a 3-substituted thiophene inhibits polymerization.

In terms of mechanism, oxidation of the thiophene monomer produces a radical cation, which then couple with another monomer to produce a radical cation dimer.

=== From bromothiophenes ===
Chemical synthesis offers two advantages compared with electrochemical synthesis of PTs: a greater selection of monomers, and, using the proper catalysts, the ability to synthesize perfectly regioregular substituted PTs. PTs were chemically synthesized by accident more than a century ago. Chemical syntheses from 2,5-dibromothiophene use Kumada coupling and related reactions

Kumada coupling route to PT.

Regioregular PTs have been prepared by lithiation 2-bromo-3-alkylthiophenes using Kumada cross-coupling. This method produces approximately 100% HT–HT couplings, according to NMR spectroscopy analysis of the diads. 2,5-Dibromo-3-alkylthiophene when treated with highly reactive "Rieke zinc" is an alternative method.

Rieke method for PT.

=== Routes employing chemical oxidants ===
In contrast to methods that require brominated monomers, the oxidative polymerization of thiophenes using ferric chloride proceeds at room temperature. The approach was reported by Sugimoto et al. in 1986. The stoichiometry is analogous to that of electropolymerization.

This method has proven to be extremely popular; antistatic coatings are prepared on a commercial scale using ferric chloride. In addition to ferric chloride, other oxidizing agents have been reported. Slow addition of ferric chloride to the monomer solution produced poly(3-(4-octylphenyl)thiophene)s with approximately 94% H–T content. Precipitation of ferric chloride in situ (in order to maximize the surface area of the catalyst) produced significantly higher yields and monomer conversions than adding monomer directly to crystalline catalyst. Higher molecular weights were reported when dry air was bubbled through the reaction mixture during polymerization. Exhaustive Soxhlet extraction after polymerization with polar solvents was found to effectively fractionate the polymer and remove residual catalyst before NMR spectroscopy. Using a lower ratio of catalyst to monomer (2:1, rather than 4:1) may increase the regioregularity of poly(3-dodecylthiophene)s. Andreani et al. reported higher yields of soluble poly(dialkylterthiophene)s in carbon tetrachloride rather than chloroform, which they attributed to the stability of the radical species in carbon tetrachloride. Higher-quality catalyst, added at a slower rate and at reduced temperature, was shown to produce high molecular weight PATs with no insoluble polymer residue. Factorial experiments indicate that the catalyst/monomer ratio correlated with increased yield of poly(3-octylthiophene). Longer polymerization time also increased the yield.

Proposed mechanisms for ferric chloride oxidative polymerizations of thiophenes.

In terms of mechanism, the oxidative polymerization using ferric chloride, a radical pathway has been proposed. Niemi et al. reported that polymerization was only observed in solvents where the catalyst was either partially or completely insoluble (chloroform, toluene, carbon tetrachloride, pentane, and hexane, and not diethyl ether, xylene, acetone, or formic acid), and speculated that the polymerization may occur at the surface of solid ferric chloride. However, this is challenged by the fact that the reaction also proceeds in acetonitrile, which FeCl_{3} is soluble in. Quantum mechanical calculations also point to a radical mechanism. The mechanism can also be inferred from the regiochemistry of the dimerization of 3-methylthiophene since C2 in [3-methylthiophene]^{+} has the highest spin density.

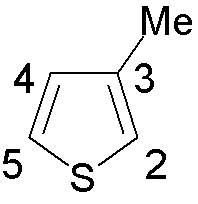

A carbocation mechanism is inferred from the structure of 3-(4-octylphenyl)thiophene prepared from ferric chloride.

Polymerization of thiophene can be effected by a solution of ferric chloride in acetonitrile. The kinetics of thiophene polymerization also seemed to contradict the predictions of the radical polymerization mechanism. Barbarella et al. studied the oligomerization of 3-(alkylsulfanyl)thiophenes, and concluded from their quantum mechanical calculations, and considerations of the enhanced stability of the radical cation when delocalized over a planar conjugated oligomer, that a radical cation mechanism analogous to that generally accepted for electrochemical polymerization was more likely. Given the difficulties of studying a system with a heterogeneous, strongly oxidizing catalyst that produces difficult to characterize rigid-rod polymers, the mechanism of oxidative polymerization is by no means decided. The radical cation mechanism is generally accepted.

== Applications ==
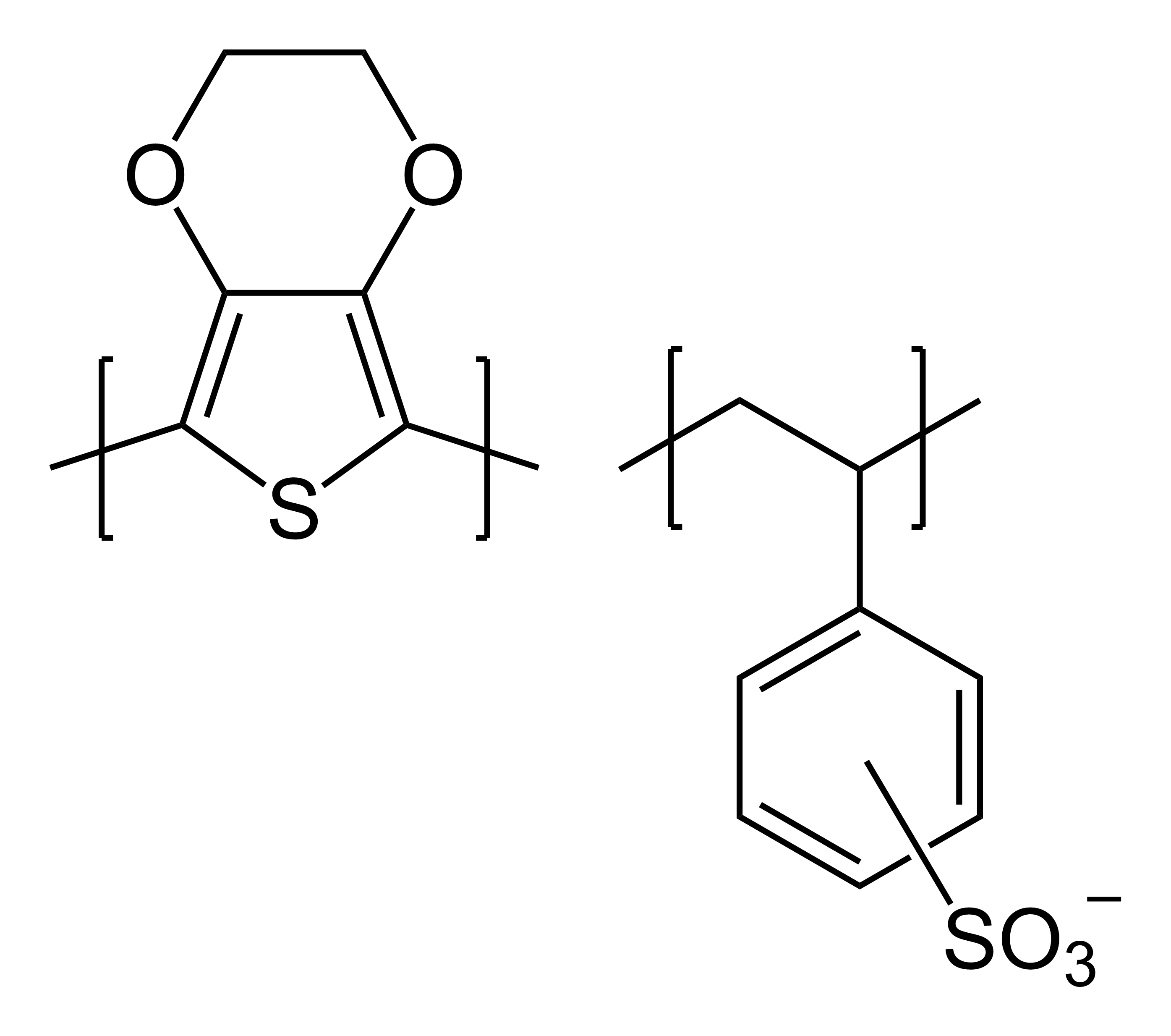
PEDOT-PSS.

As an example of a static application, poly(3,4-ethylenedioxythiophene)-poly(styrene sulfonate) (PEDOT-PSS) product ("Clevios P") from Heraeus has been extensively used as an antistatic coating (as packaging materials for electronic components, for example). AGFA coats 200 m × 10 m of photographic film per year with PEDOT:PSS because of its antistatic properties. The thin layer of PEDOT:PSS is virtually transparent and colorless, prevents electrostatic discharges during film rewinding, and reduces dust buildup on the negatives after processing.

=== Proposed applications ===
PEDOT also has been proposed for dynamic applications where a potential is applied to a polymer film. PEDOT-coated windows and mirrors become opaque or reflective upon the application of an electric potential, a manifestation of its electrochromic properties. Widespread adoption of electrochromic windows promise significant savings in air conditioning costs.

Another potential application include field-effect transistors, electroluminescent devices, solar cells, photochemical resists, nonlinear optic devices, batteries, diodes, and chemical sensors. In general, two categories of applications are proposed for conducting polymers. Static applications rely upon the intrinsic conductivity of the materials, combined with their processing and material properties common to polymeric materials. Dynamic applications utilize changes in the conductive and optical properties, resulting either from application of electric potentials or from environmental stimuli.

PTs have been touted as sensor elements. In addition to biosensor applications, PTs can also be functionalized with receptors for detecting metal ions or chiral molecules as well. PTs with pendant crown ether functionalities exhibit properties that vary with the alkali metal. and main-chain.

Chiral PT synthesized by Yashima and Goto.

Polythiophenes show potential in the treatment of prion diseases.
