= Conductive polymer =

Organic polymers that conduct electricity

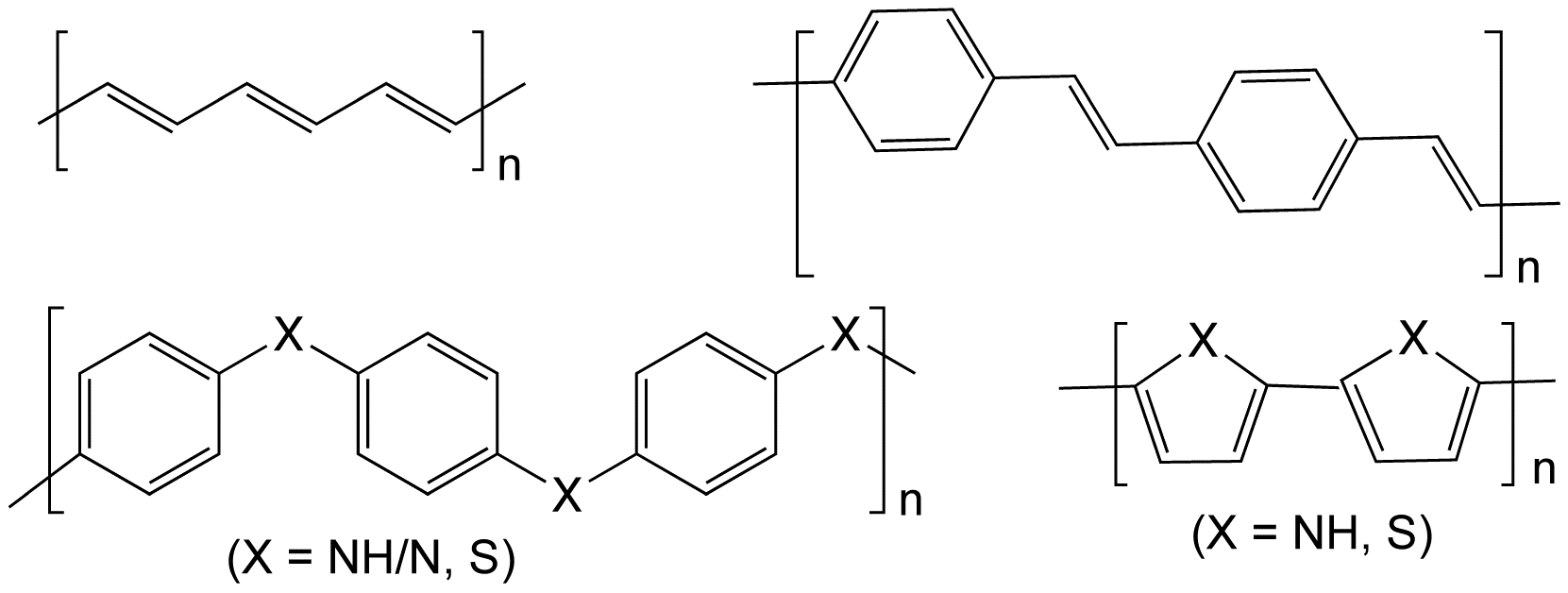
Chemical structures of some conductive polymers. From top left clockwise: polyacetylene; polyphenylene vinylene; polypyrrole (X = NH) and polythiophene (X = S); and polyaniline (X = NH) and polyphenylene sulfide (X = S).

Conductive polymers or, more precisely, intrinsically conducting polymers (ICPs) are organic polymers that conduct electricity. Such compounds may have metallic conductivity or can be semiconductors. The main advantage of conductive polymers is that they are easy to process, mainly by dispersion. Conductive polymers are generally not thermoplastics, i.e., they are not thermoformable. But, like insulating polymers, they are organic materials. They can offer high electrical conductivity but do not show similar mechanical properties to other commercially available polymers. The electrical properties can be fine-tuned using the methods of organic synthesis and by advanced dispersion techniques.

== History ==
Polyaniline was first described in the mid-19th century by Henry Letheby, who investigated the electrochemical and chemical oxidation products of aniline in acidic media. He noted that the reduced form was colourless but the oxidized forms were deep blue.

The first highly-conductive organic compounds were the charge transfer complexes. In the 1950s, researchers reported that polycyclic aromatic compounds formed semi-conducting charge-transfer complex salts with halogens. In 1954, researchers at Bell Labs and elsewhere reported organic charge transfer complexes with resistivities as low as 8 Ω-cm. In the early 1970s, researchers demonstrated salts of tetrathiafulvalene show almost metallic conductivity, while superconductivity was demonstrated in 1980. Broad research on salts of charge transfer complexes continues today. While these compounds were technically not polymers, this indicated that organic compounds can carry current. While organic conductors were previously intermittently discussed, the field was particularly energized by the prediction of superconductivity following the discovery of BCS theory.

In 1963 Australians B.A. Bolto, D.E. Weiss, and coworkers reported derivatives of polypyrrole with resistivities as low as 1 Ω.cm. There have been multiple reports of similar high-conductivity oxidized polyacetylenes. With the notable exception of charge transfer complexes (some of which are even superconductors), organic molecules were previously considered insulators or at best weakly conducting semiconductors. Subsequently, DeSurville and coworkers reported high conductivity in a polyaniline. Likewise, in 1980, Diaz and Logan reported films of polyaniline that can serve as electrodes.

While mostly operating at the scale of less than 100 nanometers, "molecular" electronic processes can collectively manifest on a macro scale. Examples include quantum tunneling, negative resistance, phonon-assisted hopping and polarons. In 1977, Alan J. Heeger, Alan MacDiarmid and Hideki Shirakawa reported that halogen doping of polyacetylene could produce high electrical conductivity in an organic polymer. For this research, they were awarded the 2000 Nobel Prize in Chemistry "for the discovery and development of conductive polymers." Polyacetylene itself did not find practical applications, but drew the attention of scientists and encouraged the rapid growth of the field. Since the late 1980s, organic light-emitting diodes (OLEDs) have emerged as an important application of conducting polymers.

== Types ==
Linear-backbone "polymer blacks" (polyacetylene, polypyrrole, polyindole and polyaniline) and their copolymers are the main class of conductive polymers. Poly(p-phenylene vinylene) (PPV) and its soluble derivatives have emerged as the prototypical electroluminescent semiconducting polymers. Today, poly(3-alkylthiophenes) are the archetypical materials for solar cells and transistors.

The following table presents some organic conductive polymers according to their composition. The well-studied classes are written in bold and the less well studied ones are in italic.

The main chain contains	No heteroatom	Heteroatoms present	
The main chain contains	No heteroatom	Nitrogen-containing	Sulfur-containing
Aromatic cycles	Poly(fluorene)s; polyphenylenes; polypyrenes; polyazulenes; polynaphthalenes; polybenzodifurandiones	The N is in the aromatic cycle: **poly(pyrrole)s (PPY)**; polycarbazoles; polyindoles; polyazepines; The N is outside the aromatic cycle: **polyanilines (PANI)**	The S is in the aromatic cycle: **poly(thiophene)s (PT)**; **poly(3,4-ethylenedioxythiophene) (PEDOT)**; The S is outside the aromatic cycle: **poly(p-phenylene sulfide) (PPS)**
Double bonds	**Poly(acetylene)s (PAC)**		
Aromatic cycles and double bonds	**Poly(p-phenylene vinylene) (PPV)**		

== Synthesis ==
Conductive polymers are prepared by many methods. Most conductive polymers are prepared by oxidative coupling of monocyclic precursors. Such reactions entail dehydrogenation:

n H–[X]–H $\;\rightarrow\;$ H–[X]_{n}–H + 2(n–1) H^{+} + 2(n–1) e^{−}

The low solubility of most polymers presents challenges. Some researchers add solubilizing functional groups to some or all monomers to increase solubility. Others address this through the formation of nanostructures and surfactant-stabilized conducting polymer dispersions in water. These include polyaniline nanofibers and PEDOT:PSS. In many cases, the molecular weights of conductive polymers are lower than conventional polymers such as polyethylene. However, in some cases, the molecular weight need not be high to achieve the desired properties.

There are two main methods used to synthesize conductive polymers, chemical synthesis and electro (co)polymerization. The chemical synthesis means connecting carbon-carbon bond of monomers by placing the simple monomers under various condition, such as heating, pressing, light exposure and catalyst. The advantage is high yield. However, there are many plausible impurities in the end product. The electro (co)polymerization means inserting three electrodes (reference electrode, counter electrode and working electrode) into solution including reactors or monomers. By applying voltage to electrodes, redox reaction to synthesize polymer is promoted. Electro (co)polymerization can also be divided into Cyclic voltammetry and Potentiostatic method by applying cyclic voltage and constant voltage, respectively. The advantage of Electro (co)polymerization are the high purity of products. But the method can only synthesize a few products at a time.

== Molecular basis of electrical conductivity ==
The conductivity of such polymers is the result of several processes. For example, in traditional polymers such as polyethylenes, the valence electrons are bound in sp^{3} hybridized covalent bonds. Such "sigma-bonding electrons" have low mobility and do not contribute to the electrical conductivity of the material. However, in conjugated materials, the situation is completely different. Conducting polymers have backbones of contiguous sp^{2} hybridized carbon centers. One valence electron on each center resides in a p_{z} orbital, which is orthogonal to the other three sigma-bonds. All the p_{z} orbitals combine with each other to a molecule wide delocalized set of orbitals. The electrons in these delocalized orbitals have high mobility when the material is "doped" by oxidation, which removes some of these delocalized electrons. Thus, the conjugated p-orbitals form a one-dimensional electronic band, and the electrons within this band become mobile when it is partially emptied. The band structures of conductive polymers can easily be calculated with a tight binding model. In principle, these same materials can be doped by reduction, which adds electrons to an otherwise unfilled band. In practice, most organic conductors are doped oxidatively to give p-type materials. The redox doping of organic conductors is analogous to the doping of silicon semiconductors, whereby a small fraction of silicon atoms are replaced by electron-rich, e.g., phosphorus, or electron-poor, e.g., boron, atoms to create n-type and p-type semiconductors, respectively.

Although typically "doping" conductive polymers involves oxidizing or reducing the material, conductive organic polymers associated with a protic solvent may also be "self-doped."

Undoped conjugated polymers are semiconductors or insulators. In such compounds, the energy gap can be > 2 eV, which is too great for thermally activated conduction. Therefore, undoped conjugated polymers, such as polythiophenes, polyacetylenes only have a low electrical conductivity of around 10^{−10} to 10^{−8} S/cm. Even at a very low level of doping (< 1%), electrical conductivity increases several orders of magnitude up to values of around 0.1 S/cm. Subsequent doping of the conducting polymers will result in a saturation of the conductivity at values around 0.1–10 kS/cm (10–1000 S/m) for different polymers. Highest values reported up to now are for the conductivity of stretch oriented polyacetylene with confirmed values of about 80 kS/cm (8 MS/m). Although the pi-electrons in polyacetylene are delocalized along the chain, pristine polyacetylene is not a metal. Polyacetylene has alternating single and double bonds which have lengths of 1.44 and 1.36 Å, respectively. Upon doping, the bond alteration is diminished in conductivity increases. Non-doping increases in conductivity can also be accomplished in a field effect transistor (organic FET or OFET) and by irradiation. Some materials also exhibit negative differential resistance and voltage-controlled "switching" analogous to that seen in inorganic amorphous semiconductors.

Despite intensive research, the relationship between morphology, chain structure and conductivity is still poorly understood. Generally, it is assumed that conductivity should be higher for the higher degree of crystallinity and better alignment of the chains, however this could not be confirmed for polyaniline and was only recently confirmed for PEDOT, which are largely amorphous.

== Properties and applications ==
Conductive polymers show promise in antistatic materials and they have been incorporated into commercial displays and batteries. Literature suggests they are also promising in organic solar cells, printed electronic circuits, organic light-emitting diodes, actuators, electrochromism, supercapacitors, chemical sensors, chemical sensor arrays, and biosensors, flexible transparent displays, electromagnetic shielding and possibly replacement for the popular transparent conductor indium tin oxide. Another use is for microwave-absorbent coatings, particularly radar-absorptive coatings on stealth aircraft. Conducting polymers are rapidly gaining attraction in new applications with increasingly processable materials with better electrical and physical properties and lower costs. The new nano-structured forms of conducting polymers particularly, augment this field with their higher surface area and better dispersability. Research reports showed that nanostructured conducting polymers in the form of nanofibers and nanosponges exhibit significantly improved capacitance values as compared to their non-nanostructured counterparts.

With the availability of stable and reproducible dispersions, PEDOT and polyaniline have gained some large-scale applications. While PEDOT (poly(3,4-ethylenedioxythiophene)) is mainly used in antistatic applications and as a transparent conductive layer in form of PEDOT:PSS dispersions (PSS=polystyrene sulfonic acid), polyaniline is widely used for printed circuit board manufacturing – in the final finish, for protecting copper from corrosion and preventing its solderability. Moreover, polyindole is also starting to gain attention for various applications due to its high redox activity, thermal stability, and slow degradation properties than competitors polyaniline and polypyrrole.

=== Electroluminescence ===
Electroluminescence is light emission stimulated by electric current. In organic compounds, electroluminescence has been known since the early 1950s, when Bernanose and coworkers first produced electroluminescence in crystalline thin films of acridine orange and quinacrine. In 1960, researchers at Dow Chemical developed AC-driven electroluminescent cells using doping. In some cases, similar light emission is observed when a voltage is applied to a thin layer of a conductive organic polymer film. While electroluminescence was originally mostly of academic interest, the increased conductivity of modern conductive polymers means enough power can be put through the device at low voltages to generate practical amounts of light. This property has led to the development of flat panel displays using organic LEDs, solar panels, and optical amplifiers.

=== Barriers to applications ===
Since most conductive polymers require oxidative doping, the properties of the resulting state are crucial. Such materials are salt-like (polymer salt), which makes them less soluble in organic solvents and water and hence harder to process. Furthermore, the charged organic backbone is often unstable towards atmospheric moisture. Improving processability for many polymers requires the introduction of solubilizing substituents, which can further complicate the synthesis.

Experimental and theoretical thermodynamical evidence suggests that conductive polymers may even be completely and principally insoluble so that they can only be processed by dispersion.

=== Trends ===
Most recent emphasis is on organic light emitting diodes and organic polymer solar cells. The Organic Electronics Association is an international platform to promote applications of organic semiconductors. Conductive polymer products with embedded and improved electromagnetic interference (EMI) and electrostatic discharge (ESD) protection have led to both prototypes and products. For example, Polymer Electronics Research Center at University of Auckland is developing a range of novel DNA sensor technologies based on conducting polymers, photoluminescent polymers and inorganic nanocrystals (quantum dots) for simple, rapid and sensitive gene detection. Typical conductive polymers must be "doped" to produce high conductivity. As of 2001, there remains to be discovered an organic polymer that is intrinsically electrically conducting. Recently (as of 2020), researchers from IMDEA Nanoscience Institute reported experimental demonstration of the rational engineering of 1D polymers that are located near the quantum phase transition from the topologically trivial to non-trivial class, thus featuring a narrow bandgap.

== See also ==
- Organic electronics
- Organic semiconductor
- Molecular electronics
- List of emerging technologies
- Conjugated microporous polymer
