= C6H6O2S =

The molecular formula C_{6}H_{6}O_{2}S (molar mass: 142.18 g/mol, exact mass: 142.0089 u) may refer to:

- 3,4-Ethylenedioxythiophene (EDOT)
- Phenylsulfinic acid
- 3-Thiophene acetic acid
- Thiophene-2-acetic acid
