= CUTC =

CUTC may refer to:

- Canadian Undergraduate Technology Conference
- Canterbury University Tramping Club, in Christchurch, New Zealand
- Charles Urban Trading Company
- Copper(I)-thiophene-2-carboxylate (CuTC), a reagent used in organic chemistry
- Copper homeostasis protein cutC homolog, encoded by the CUTC gene
- Teachers College, Columbia University
