= Tellurophenes =

Family of organotellurium compounds

Tellurophenes are a family of organotellurium compounds derived formally from the parent compound tellurophene with the chemical formula C_{4}H_{4}Te.

== Synthesis ==
Tetraphenyltellurophene was prepared in 1961 by Braye et al. by the reaction of 1,4-dilithiotetraphenylbutadiene with tellurium tetrachloride. Tetraphenyltellurophene is a yellow-orange solid with a melting point of 239-239.5 °C. The same compound was obtained from 1,4-diiodotetraphenylbutadiene and lithium telluride in 82% yield.

In 1966, unsubstituted tellurophene was prepared by the reaction of sodium telluride with diacetylene . This method could be generalised to prepare 2,5-derivatives of tellurophene by selecting a suitably-substituted diacetylene precursor.

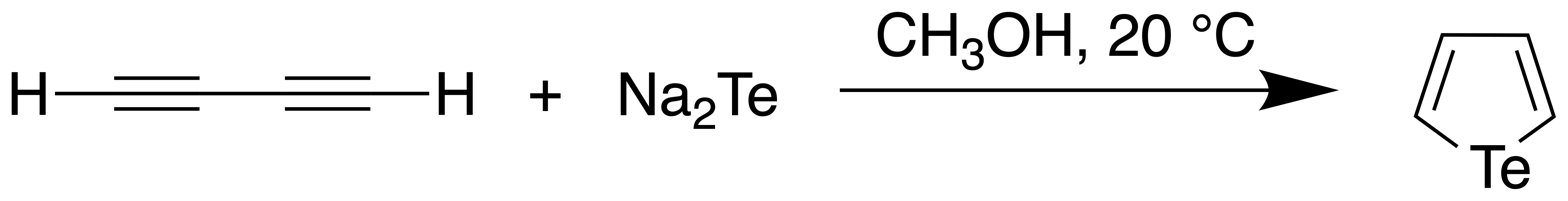
improvedsynthesis

Treating 1,1-dibromo-1-en-3-ynes with sodium telluride gives a variety of functionalized tellurophenes.

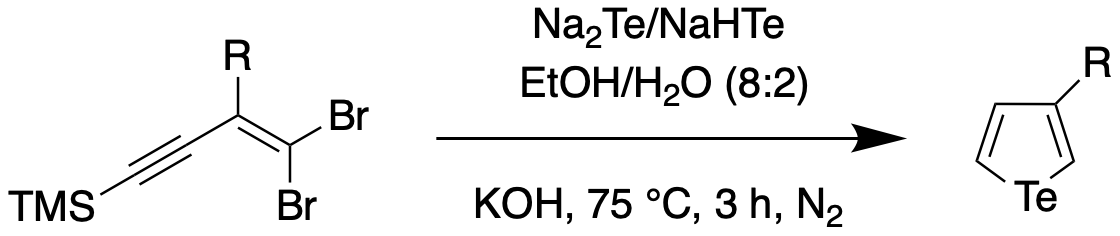

The reaction was highly influenced by solvent, e.g. a mixture of DMF and t-BuOH.

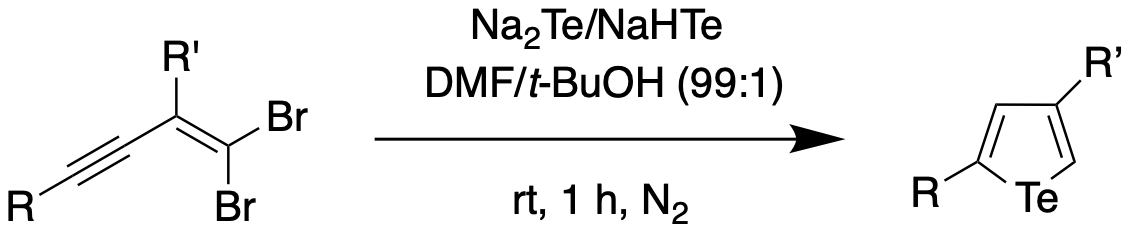
Synthesis of 2,4-difunctionalized tellurophenes.

The copper-catalyzed cyclizations of chalcogenoenynes give 3-substituted chalcogenophenes, which could be further functionalized using boronic acids via palladium-catalyzed Suzuki coupling.

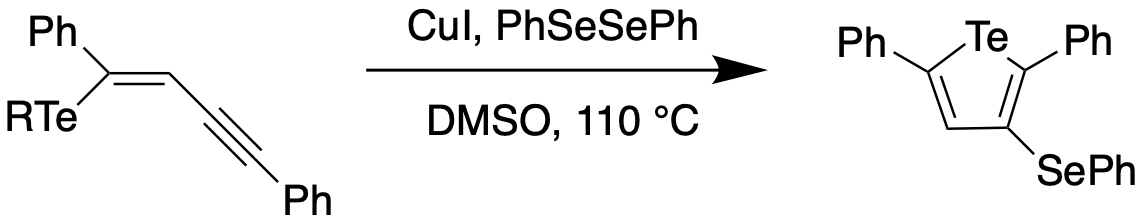
5.05Wk4

== Structure ==
The geometry of tellurophene was first determined in 1973 through microwave spectroscopy, and has been further refined through X-ray diffraction studies. It has been found that the Te–C bond has a length of 2.046 Å, which is longer than that of selenophene. Further, the C–Te–C angle has been determined to be 82°, smaller than that found in selenophene, an observation attributed to the larger size of the tellurium atom. These findings are also consistent with the aromaticity of selenophene being greater than that of tellurophene; amongst its congeners, the order of decreasing aromaticity has been demonstrated to be: benzene > thiophene > selenophene > tellurophene > furan.

== Reactivity ==
=== Cross-coupling ===
Halide-substituted tellurophenes participate in metal-catalyzed cross coupling reactions. Perfluoroaryl-substituted tellurophenes form by Stille coupling.

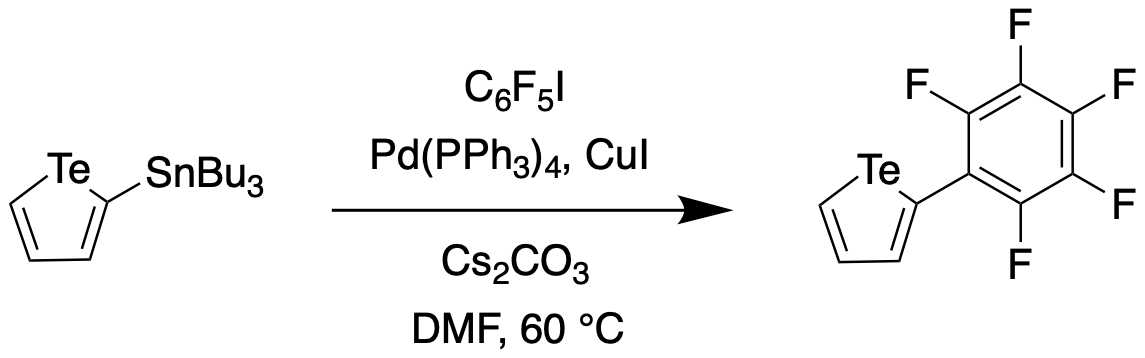
Taylor Tellurophene

Metal-catalyzed cross-couplings to synthesize 3-functionalized tellurophenes require 3-bromo- or 3-iodo-tellurophenes, the syntheses of which could be complicated.

=== Lewis acidity ===
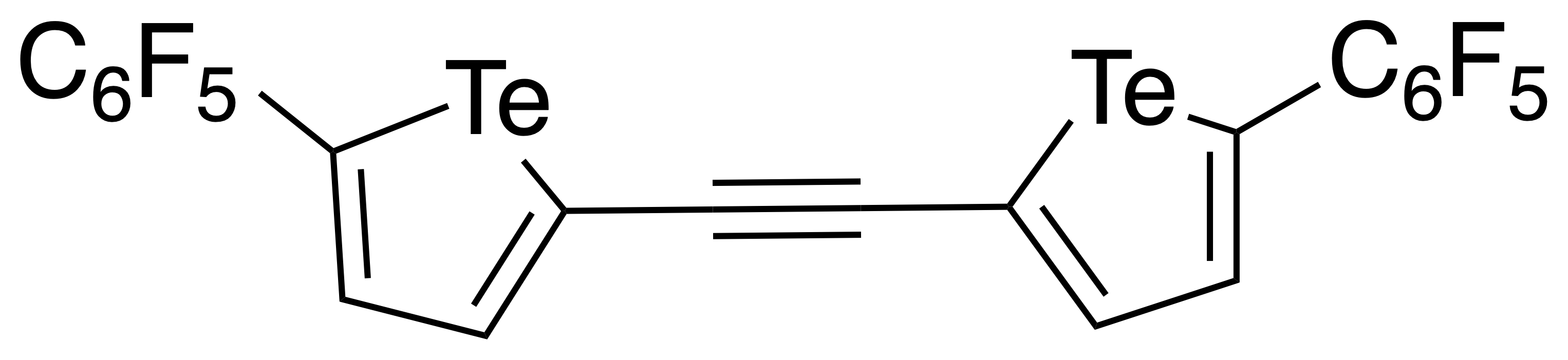
Ethynylene-linked bistellurophene anion receptor

Bistellurophenes form complexes with halides, demonstrating their Lewis acid character. The binding of chloride to 2,5-bis[(perfluoro)aryl]tellurophene has an association constant (K_{a}) of 310 ± 20 L mol^{−1}.

=== Redox ===
Tellurophenes undergo oxidative addition of halogens to give Te(IV) derivatives. The reaction is reversed with UV-radiation. Tellurophene can be oxidized with hydrogen peroxide to give the oxide:

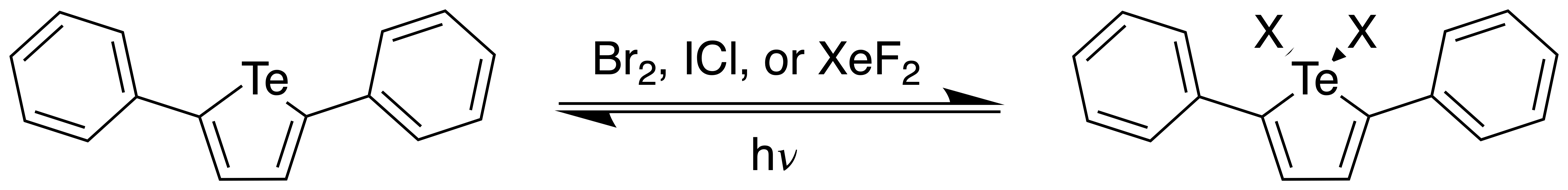
Photoreductive elimination of halogens using 2,5-diphenyltellurophene (PT)

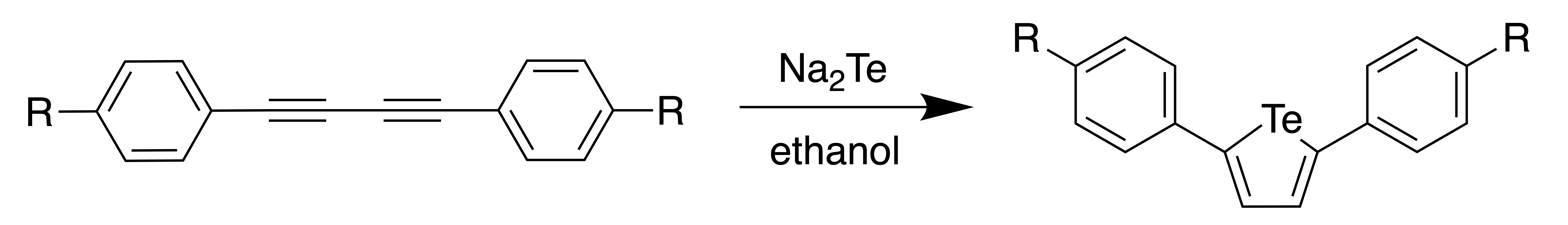
Synthesis of a water-soluble tellurophene (R = (OC_{2}H_{4})_{n}OCH_{3}).

The oxidative ring opening of 2,5-diphenyltellurophene (PT) with meta-chloroperoxybenzoic acid (mCPBA).

=== Polymers ===
Poly-3-alkyltellurophenes (P3ATe) can be obtained through catalyst transfer polymerization (CTP). CTP is an important route to synthesize polymers with a narrow molecular weight distribution and a well defined end-group, but it was found in 2013 that applying CTP-conditions for the synthesis of P3ATe led to polymers with low molecular weights, and broad polydispersities. To obtain P3ATe with a narrow polydispersity, the authors investigated the optimal conditions using kinetic studies and DFT calculations. It was found experimentally that the branched side chain played an important role on the polymerization rate and polymer quality. To mitigate this effect, monomers with various other side chains were synthesized. From this, it was found that moving the ethyl branches away from the heterocycle to the more remote 3- and 4- positions led to an improved polymerization rate and control, such that P3ATe with narrow polydispersities and high molecular weights were obtained. This improvement was attributed to the lack of steric hindrance. Furthermore, it was found that upon moving the branching point away from the heterocycle led to a red-shift in the optical absorption, which was attributed to a decrease in the degree of twisting, resulting in an increase in the conjugation between the tellurophene backbone.

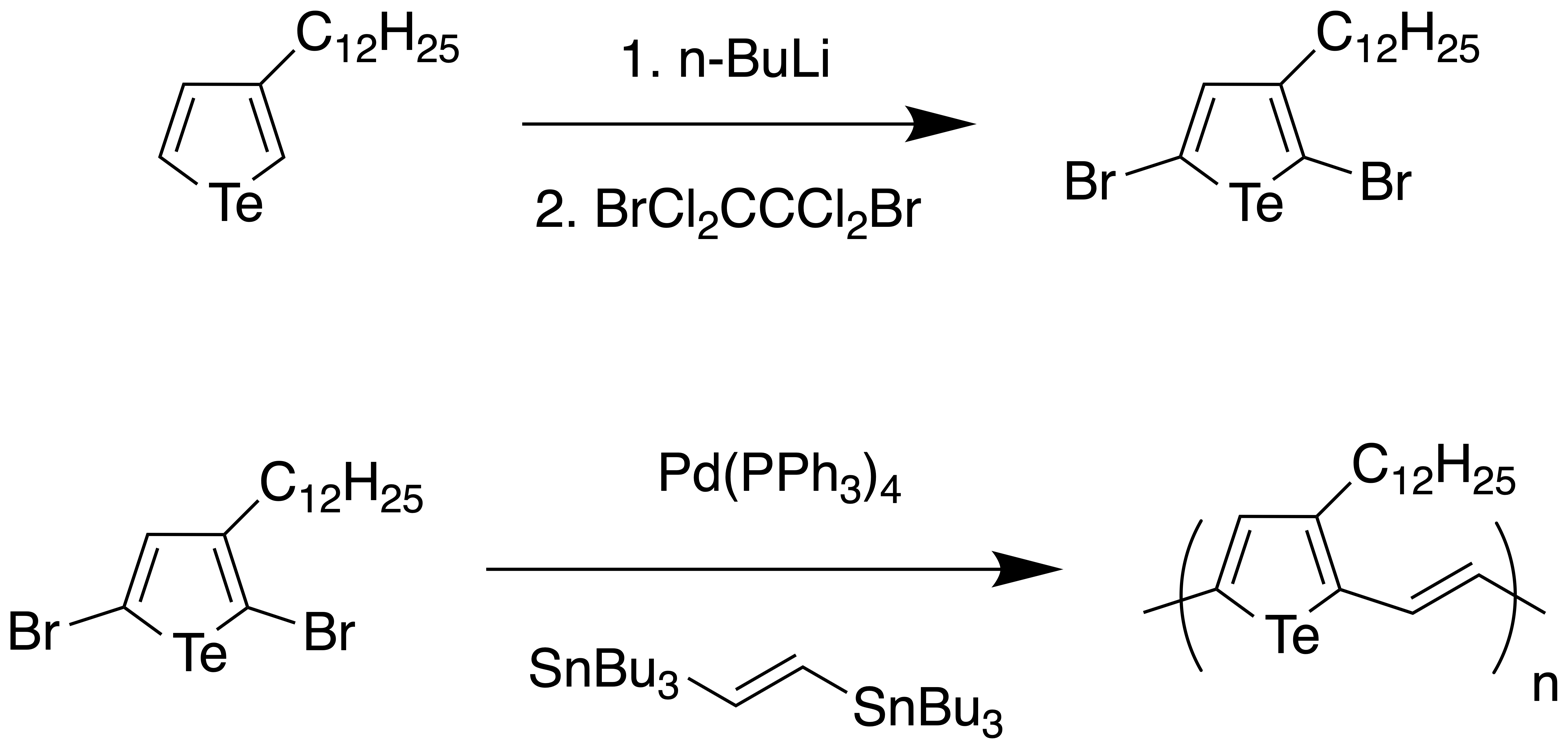
Synthesis of P3TeV using Stille coupling

Tellurophene-vinylene copolymer can be obtained through Stille coupling of 2,5-dibromo-3-dodecyltellurophene and (E)-1,2-bis(tributylstannyl)ethylene, resulting in P3TeV in 57% yield with an approximate M_{n} of 10 kDa and a polydispersity of 2.4. By synthesizing thiophene and selenophene analogues, it was found that there was a reduction in the optical band gap as a result of the stabilization of the LUMO, resulting in a small band gap of 1.4 eV for P3TeV. By constructing organic field effect transistors (OFETs), it was found that the selenophene polymer had the highest charge mobility, and that the tellurium analogue did not lead to an increase in mobility despite the larger size of tellurium, and possibility of closer interchain Te-Te interactions, which was attributed to the low solubility of P3TeV which resulted in poor film formation. Therefore, the authors remarked that future work entailed modifying the side-chains to increase solubility.

== Optoelectronic properties ==
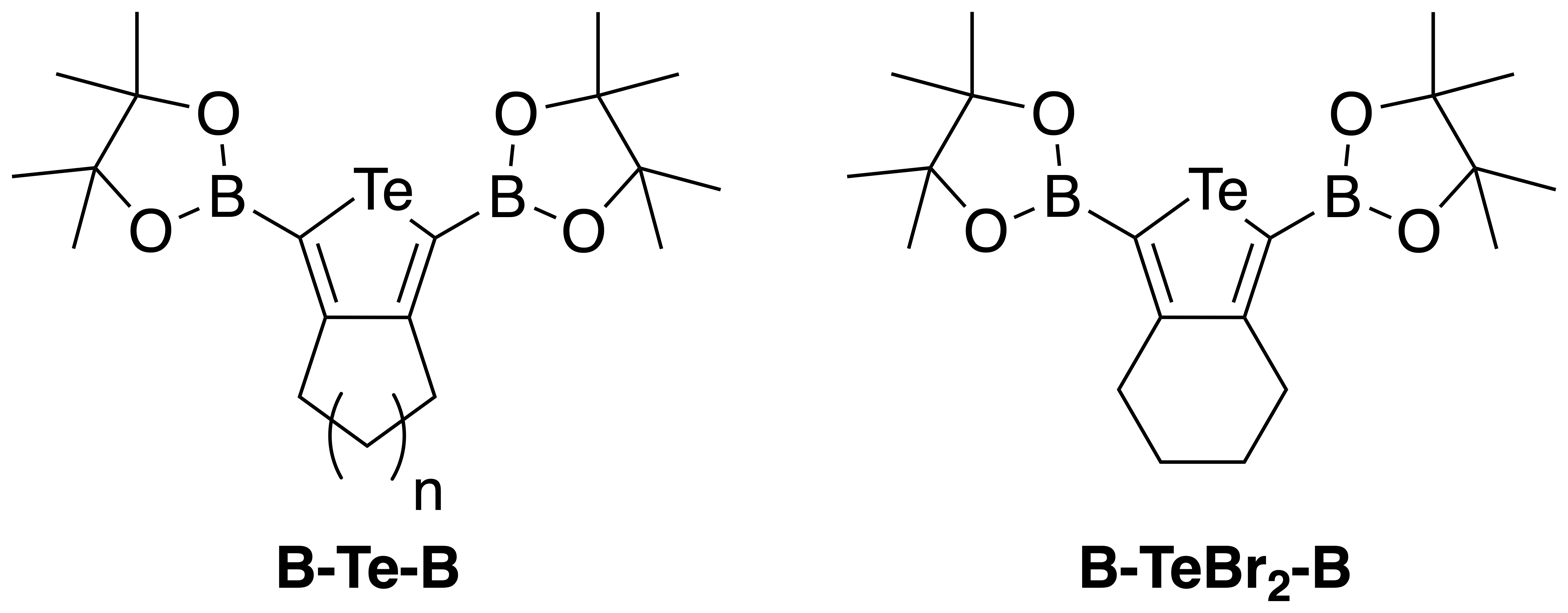
Phosphorescent pinacolboronate-substituted tellurophenes

The optical properties of tellurophenes have been reported. In 2014, Rivard et al. reported the phosphorescence of pinacolboronate-substituted tellurophenes at room temperature, Phosphorescence was found to be aggregation-induced, as the tellurophene was non-emissive when dissolved in THF solution.

Compared to thiophenes, tellurophenes have lower optical band gaps, significantly lower LUMO levels, and higher charge carrier mobilities. This was in contrast to the sulfur and selenium analogues, where the triplet state was found to be ~1 eV higher in energy.

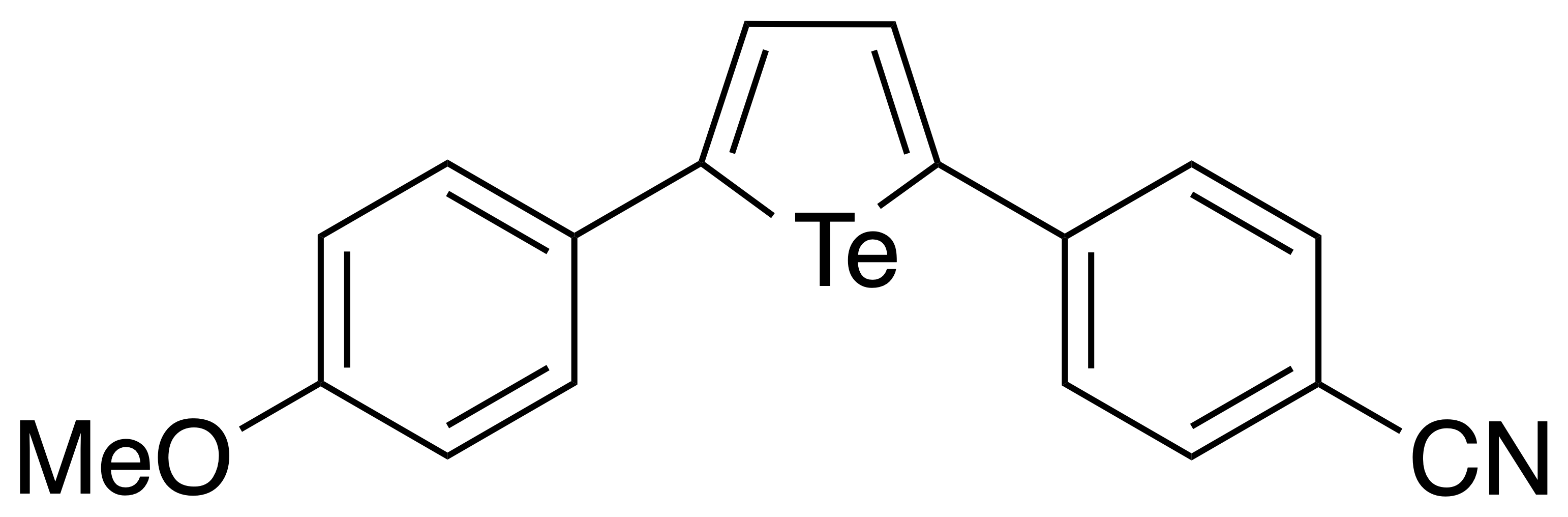
A 2,5-diaryltellurophene with electron-donating and electron-withdrawing groups
