= C17H20N2S =

The molecular formula C_{17}H_{20}N_{2}S (molar mass: 284.42 g/mol, exact mass: 284.1347 u) may refer to:

- Isopromethazine
- Promazine
- Promethazine
- Tienopramine
