= HSAB theory =

Chemical theory about acids and bases

HSAB is an acronym for "hard and soft (Lewis) acids and bases". HSAB is widely used in chemistry for explaining the stability of compounds, reaction mechanisms and pathways. It assigns the terms 'hard' or 'soft', and 'acid' or 'base' to chemical species. 'Hard' applies to species which are small, have high charge states (the charge criterion applies mainly to acids, to a lesser extent to bases), and are weakly polarizable. 'Soft' applies to species which are big, have low charge states and are strongly polarizable.

The theory is used in contexts where a qualitative, rather than quantitative, description would help in understanding the predominant factors which drive chemical properties and reactions. This is especially so in transition metal chemistry, where numerous experiments have been done to determine the relative ordering of ligands and transition metal ions in terms of their hardness and softness.

HSAB theory is also useful in predicting the products of metathesis reactions. In 2005 it was shown that even the sensitivity and performance of explosive materials can be explained on basis of HSAB theory.

Ralph Pearson introduced the HSAB principle in the early 1960s as an attempt to unify inorganic and organic reaction chemistry.

== Theory ==
Hard–soft trends for acids and bases

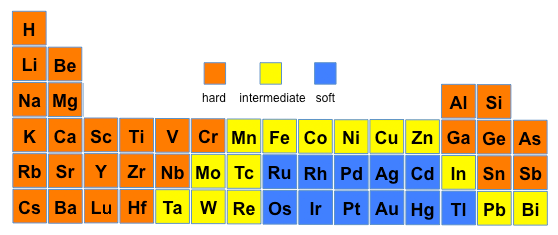
Acids

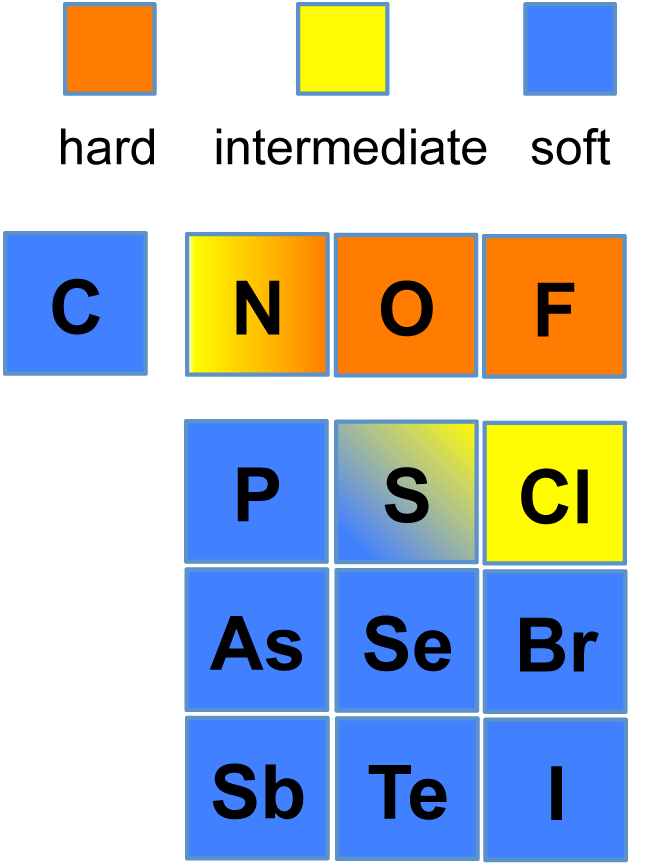
Bases

Essentially, the theory states that soft acids prefer to form bonds with soft bases, whereas hard acids prefer to form bonds with hard bases, all other factors being equal. It can also be said that hard acids bind strongly to hard bases and soft acids bind strongly to soft bases. The HSAB classification in the original work was largely based on equilibrium constants of Lewis acid/base reactions with a reference base for comparison.

Comparing tendencies of hard acids and bases vs. soft acids and bases
Property	Hard acids and bases	Soft acids and bases
atomic/ionic radius	small	large
oxidation state	high	low or zero
polarizability	low	high
electronegativity (bases)	high	low
HOMO energy of bases	low	higher
LUMO energy of acids	high	lower (but more than soft-base HOMO)
affinity	ionic bonding	covalent bonding

Examples of hard and soft acids and bases
Acids				Bases			
hard		soft		hard		soft	
Hydronium	H_{3}O^{+}	Mercury	CH_{3}Hg^{+}, Hg^{2+}, Hg_{2}^{2+}	Hydroxide	OH^{−}	Hydride	H^{−}
Alkali metals	Li^{+}, Na^{+}, K^{+}	Platinum	Pt^{2+}	Alkoxide	RO^{−}	Thiolate	RS^{−}
Titanium	Ti^{4+}	Palladium	Pd^{2+}	Halogens	F^{−}, Cl^{−}	Halogens	I^{−}
Chromium	Cr^{3+}, Cr^{6+}	Silver	Ag^{+}	Ammonia	NH_{3}	Phosphine	PR_{3}
Boron trifluoride	BF_{3}	Borane	BH_{3}	Carboxylate	CH_{3}COO^{−}	Thiocyanate	SCN^{−}
Carbocation	R_{3}C^{+}	P-chloranil	C_{6}Cl_{4}O_{2}	Carbonate	CO_{3}^{2−}	Carbon monoxide	CO
Lanthanides	Ln^{3+}	Bulk metals	M^{0}	Hydrazine	N_{2}H_{4}	Benzene	C_{6}H_{6}
Thorium, uranium	Th^{4+}, U^{4+}	Gold	Au^{+}				

Borderline cases are also identified: borderline acids are trimethylborane, sulfur dioxide and ferrous Fe^{2+}, cobalt Co^{2+} caesium Cs^{+} and lead Pb^{2+} cations. Borderline bases are: aniline, pyridine, nitrogen N_{2} and the azide, chloride, bromide, nitrate and sulfate anions.

Generally speaking, acids and bases interact and the most stable interactions are hard–hard (ionogenic character) and soft–soft (covalent character).

An attempt to quantify the 'softness' of a base consists in determining the equilibrium constant for the following equilibrium:

BH + CH_{3}Hg^{+} ⇌ H^{+} + CH_{3}HgB

where CH_{3}Hg^{+} (methylmercury ion) is a very soft acid and H^{+} (proton) is a hard acid, which compete for B (the base to be classified).

Some examples illustrating the effectiveness of the theory:

- Bulk metals are soft acids and are poisoned by soft bases such as phosphines and sulfides.
- Hard solvents such as hydrogen fluoride, water and the protic solvents tend to dissolve strong solute bases such as fluoride and oxide anions. On the other hand, dipolar aprotic solvents such as dimethyl sulfoxide and acetone are soft solvents with a preference for solvating large anions and soft bases.
- In coordination chemistry soft–soft and hard–hard interactions exist between ligands and metal centers.

== Chemical hardness ==
Chemical hardness in electron volt
Acids			Bases		
Hydrogen	H^{+}	∞	Fluoride	F^{−}	7
Aluminium	Al^{3+}	45.8	Ammonia	NH_{3}	6.8
Lithium	Li^{+}	35.1	hydride	H^{−}	6.8
Scandium	Sc^{3+}	24.6	carbon monoxide	CO	6.0
Sodium	Na^{+}	21.1	hydroxyl	OH^{−}	5.6
Lanthanum	La^{3+}	15.4	cyanide	CN^{−}	5.3
Zinc	Zn^{2+}	10.8	phosphine	PH_{3}	5.0
Carbon dioxide	CO_{2}	10.8	nitrite	NO_{2}^{−}	4.5
Sulfur dioxide	SO_{2}	5.6	Hydrosulfide	SH^{−}	4.1
Iodine	I_{2}	3.4	Methane	CH_{3}^{−}	4.0

In 1983 Pearson together with Robert Parr extended the qualitative HSAB theory with a quantitative definition of the chemical hardness (η) as being proportional to the second derivative of the total energy of a chemical system with respect to changes in the number of electrons at a fixed nuclear environment:

$$\eta = \frac{1}{2}\left(\frac{\partial^2 E}{\partial N^2}\right)_Z$$

The factor of one-half is arbitrary and often dropped as Pearson has noted.

An operational definition for the chemical hardness is obtained by applying a three-point finite difference approximation to the second derivative:

$$\begin{align}
\eta &\approx \frac{E(N+1)-2E(N)+E(N-1)}{2}\\
&=\frac{(E(N-1)-E(N)) - (E(N)-E(N+1))}{2}\\
&=\frac{1}{2}(I-A)
\end{align}$$

where I is the ionization potential and A the electron affinity. This expression implies that the chemical hardness is proportional to the band gap of a chemical system, when a gap exists.

The first derivative of the energy with respect to the number of electrons is equal to the chemical potential, μ, of the system,

$$\mu= \left(\frac{\partial E}{\partial N}\right)_Z$$,

from which an operational definition for the chemical potential is obtained from a finite difference approximation to the first order derivative as

$$\begin{align}
\mu &\approx \frac{E(N+1)-E(N-1)}{2}\\
&=\frac{-(E(N-1)-E(N))+(E(N)-E(N+1))}{2}\\
&=-\frac{1}{2}(I+A)
\end{align}$$

which is equal to the negative of the electronegativity (χ) definition on the Mulliken scale: μ = −χ.

The hardness and Mulliken electronegativity are related as

$$2\eta = \left(\frac{\partial \mu}{\partial N}\right)_Z \approx -\left(\frac{\partial \chi}{\partial N}\right)_Z$$,

and in this sense hardness is a measure for resistance to deformation or change. Likewise a value of zero denotes maximum softness, where softness is defined as the reciprocal of hardness.

In a compilation of hardness values only that of the hydride anion deviates. Another discrepancy noted in the original 1983 article are the apparent higher hardness of Tl^{3+} compared to Tl^{+}.

== Modifications ==
If the interaction between acid and base in solution results in an equilibrium mixture the strength of the interaction can be quantified in terms of an equilibrium constant. An alternative quantitative measure is the heat (enthalpy) of formation of the Lewis acid-base adduct in a non-coordinating solvent. The ECW model is quantitative model that describes and predicts the strength of Lewis acid base interactions, -ΔH . The model assigned E and C parameters to many Lewis acids and bases. Each acid is characterized by an E_{A} and a C_{A}. Each base is likewise characterized by its own E_{B} and C_{B}. The E and C parameters refer, respectively, to the electrostatic and covalent contributions to the strength of the bonds that the acid and base will form. The equation is

-ΔH = E_{A}E_{B} + C_{A}C_{B} + W

The W term represents a constant energy contribution for acid–base reaction such as the cleavage of a dimeric acid or base. The equation predicts reversal of acids and base strengths. The graphical presentations of the equation show that there is no single order of Lewis base strengths or Lewis acid strengths. The ECW model accommodates the failure of single parameter descriptions of acid-base interactions.

A related method adopting the E and C formalism of Drago and co-workers quantitatively predicts the formation constants for complexes of many metal ions plus the proton with a wide range of unidentate Lewis acids in aqueous solution, and also offered insights into factors governing HSAB behavior in solution.

Another quantitative system has been proposed, in which Lewis acid strength toward Lewis base fluoride is based on gas-phase affinity for fluoride. Additional one-parameter base strength scales have been presented. However, it has been shown that to define the order of Lewis base strength (or Lewis acid strength) at least two properties must be considered. For Pearson's qualitative HSAB theory the two properties are hardness and strength while for Drago's quantitative ECW model the two properties are electrostatic and covalent .

== Kornblum's rule ==
HSAB theory is commonly, but misleadingly, applied to predict the reactions of ambident nucleophiles (nucleophiles that can attack from two or more places). In 1954, Nathan Kornblum et al proposed that the more electronegative atom reacts when the reaction mechanism is S_{N}1 and the less electronegative one in a S_{N}2 reaction. Kornblum's rule was later rationalized through HSAB theory, as follows: in a S_{N}1 reaction the carbocation (a hard acid) reacts with a hard base (high electronegativity) and in a S_{N}2 reaction tetravalent carbon (a soft acid) reacts with soft bases.

However, Kornblum's theory predicts the actual behavior of ambident nucleophiles quite poorly. Violations occur with cyanide, cyanate, thiocyanate, nitrite, nitronates, amide enaminols, and phenylsulfinate. Instead, the determining factor is whether the reaction exhibits a kinetic barrier. Barrier-free reactions are (initially) unselective or (subsequently) determined by equilibrium thermodynamics. Reactions with a barrier tend to involve attack on atoms from later groups and in accordance with the principle of least motion.

== See also ==
- Acid-base reaction
- Oxophilicity
