= Tellurophene =

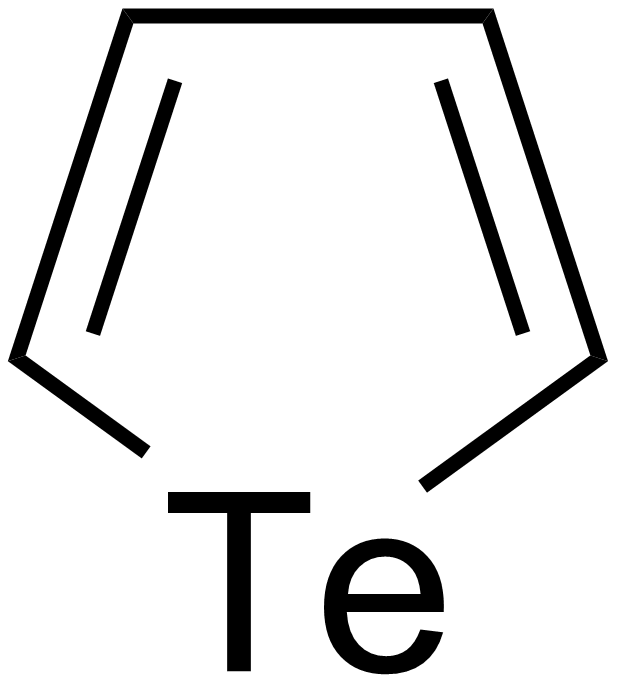

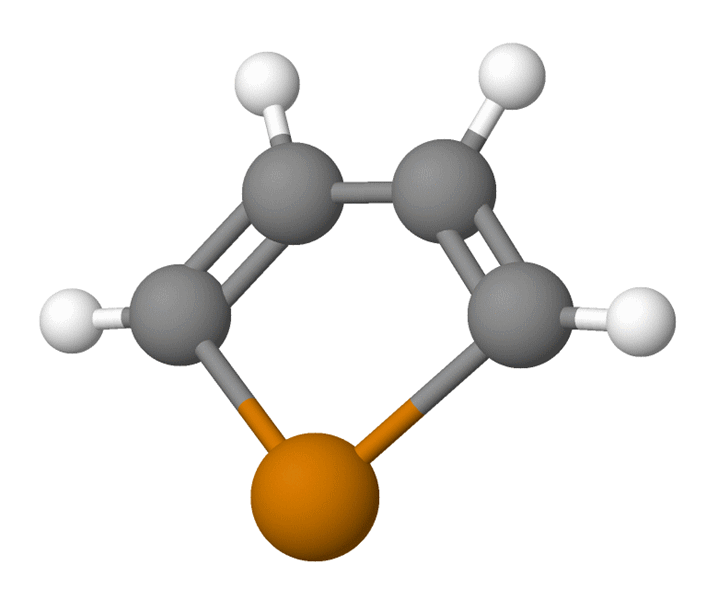

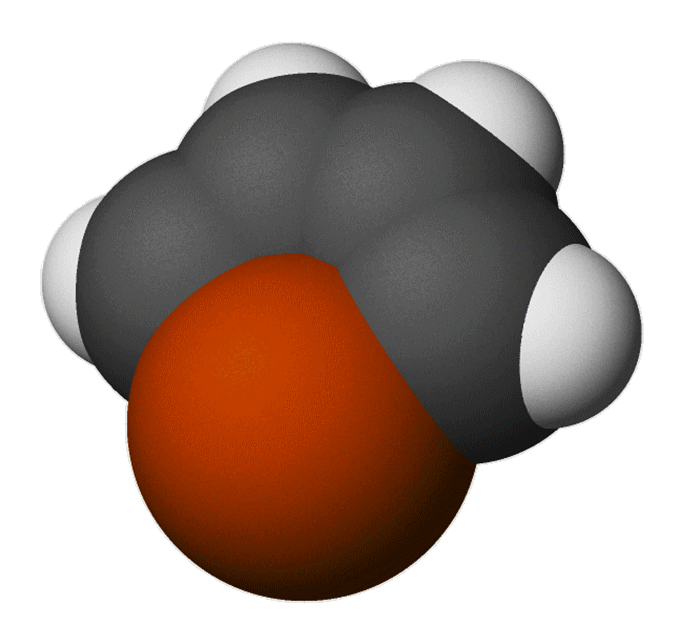

Names
- Preferred IUPAC name Tellurophene

Identifiers
CAS Number	288-08-4
3D model (JSmol)	Interactive image
Beilstein Reference	103225
ChEBI	CHEBI:30858
ChemSpider	119908
Gmelin Reference	647889
PubChem CID	136131
- InChI: InChI=1S/C4H4Te/c1-2-4-5-3-1/h1-4H Key: TULWUZJYDBGXMY-UHFFFAOYSA-N
- SMILES: C1=C[Te]C=C1

Properties
Chemical formula	C_{4}H_{4}Te
Molar mass	179.68 g·mol^{−1}
Appearance	pale yellow
Density	2.13
Melting point	−36 °C (−33 °F; 237 K)
Boiling point	148 °C (298 °F; 421 K) 714 mm Hg
Refractive index (n_{D})	1.6856
- Except where otherwise noted, data are given for materials in their standard state (at 25 °C [77 °F], 100 kPa). Infobox references

Tellurophene is the organotellurium compound with the formula C_{4}H_{4}Te. It is a heavy analogue of thiophene and selenophene. The compound is a pale yellow liquid. A number of substituted tellurophenes are known.

== Synthesis ==
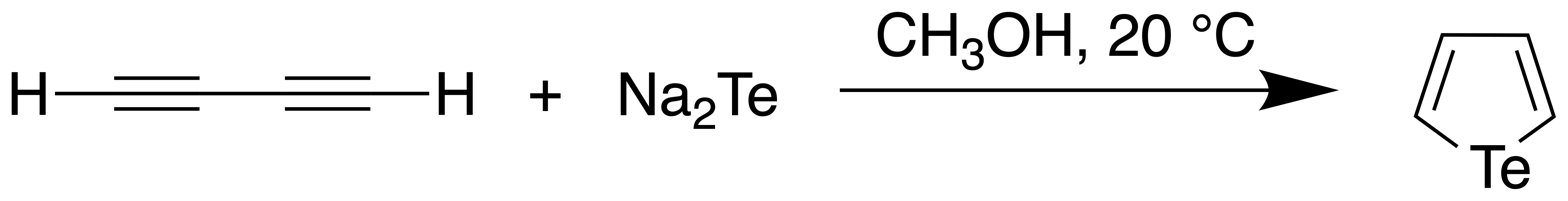
improvedsynthesis

In 1966, Mack report a synthesis of an unsubstituted tellurophene through the reaction of sodium telluride with diacetylene in methanol. This method could be generalised to prepare 2,5-derivatives of tellurophene by selecting a suitably-substituted diacetylene precursor. The product was obtained as a pale yellow liquid with a melting and boiling point of −36 °C and 148 °C, respectively. Taticchi et al. improved upon this synthesis by using a Schlenk line to exclude oxygen and moisture from the reaction vessel, using pure butadiyne (to decrease unwanted oxidation and polymerization side reactions), and by not using a vacuum to remove the methanol as it leads to loss of the product. This improved procedure allowed the tellurophene to be isolated in 47% yield. Hydrogen telluride (HTe-) and tellurols (RTeH) are implicated in these conversions.

== Structure and bonding ==
The geometry of tellurophene was first determined in 1973 through microwave spectroscopy and has been further refined through X-ray diffraction studies. The Te–C bond length is 2.046 Å and the C–Te–C angle is 82°. These findings are consistent with decreased aromaticity vs that of selenophene and related heterocycles.

== Reactivity ==
Tellurophene forms poly(tellurophene) upon treatment with ferric chloride.

C_{4}H_{4}Te + 2 FeCl_{3} → 1/n[C_{4}H_{2}Te]_{n} + 2 HCl + 2 FeCl_{2}

The conversion, an oxidative polymerization, is modeled after the corresponding synthesis of polythiophene. When treated with halogens, tellurophene gives a Te(IV) derivative:

C_{4}H_{4}Te + Cl_{2} → C_{4}H_{4}TeCl_{2}

Treatment of tellurophene with tert-butyllithium gives 2-lithiotellurophene.
