= Tienopramine =

Chemical compound

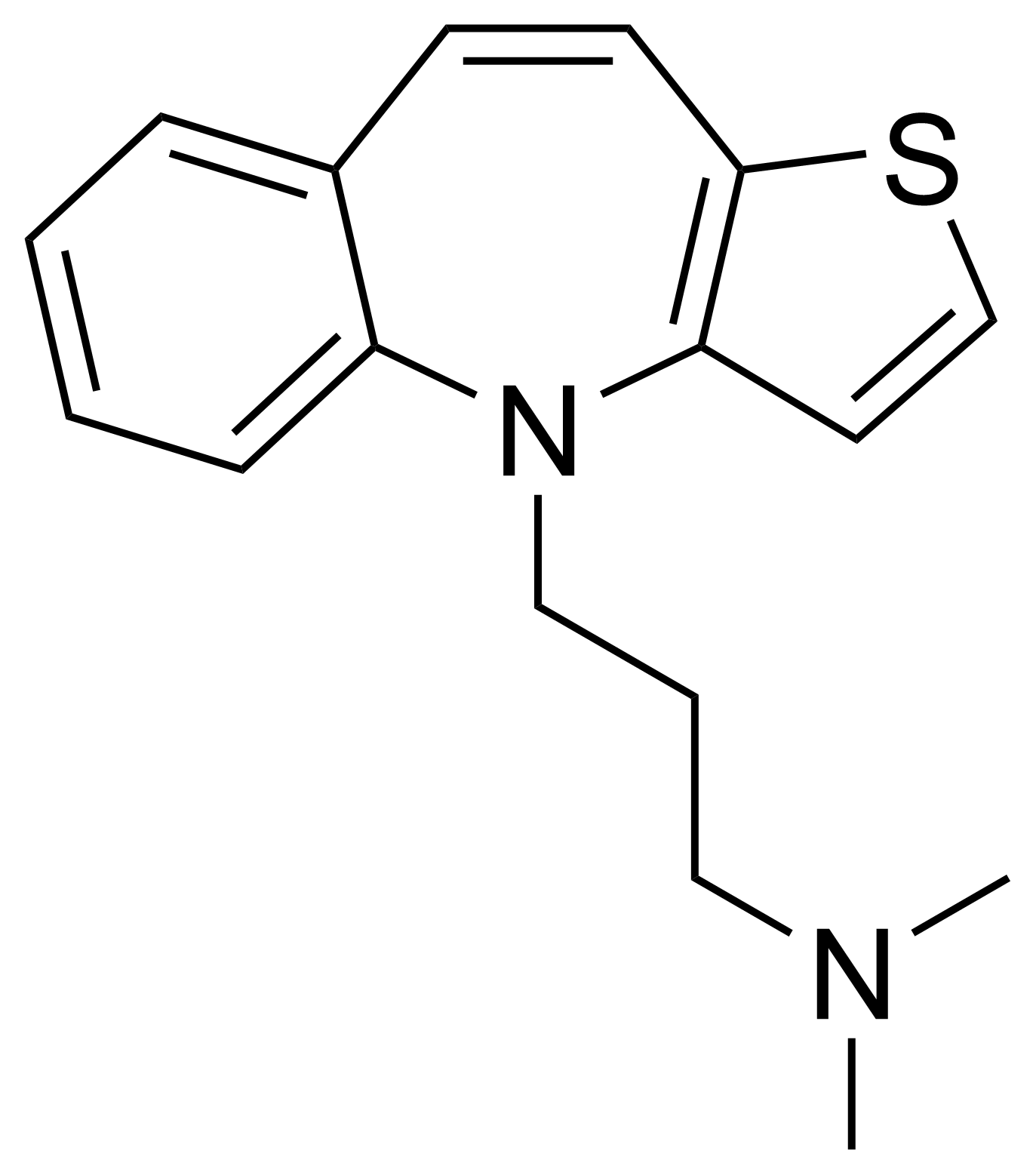

Clinical data
- Routes of administration: Oral
- ATC code: none

Legal status
- Legal status: In general: uncontrolled

Identifiers
- IUPAC name: N,N-dimethyl-3-(4H-thieno[3,2-b][1]benzazepin-4-yl)propan-1-amine
- CAS Number: 37967-98-9
- PubChem CID: 216992
- ChemSpider: 188026
- UNII: 36L0QUK8SY
- CompTox Dashboard (EPA): DTXSID80191400

Chemical and physical data
- Formula: C_{17}H_{20}N_{2}S
- Molar mass: 284.42 g·mol^{−1}
- 3D model (JSmol): Interactive image
- SMILES: s1ccc2N(c3c(\C=C/c12)cccc3)CCCN(C)C

Tienopramine is a tricyclic antidepressant (TCA) which was never marketed. It is an analogue of imipramine where one of the benzene rings has been replaced with a thiophene ring.

== See also ==
- Tricyclic antidepressant
