= Thiophene-2-carboxylic acid =

Names
- Other names 2-thenoic acid; tenoic acid; Rhinotrophyl

Identifiers
CAS Number	527-72-0
3D model (JSmol)	Interactive image
ChEBI	CHEBI:71241
ChEMBL	ChEMBL1222314
ChemSpider	10250
ECHA InfoCard	100.007.659
EC Number	208-423-4
KEGG	D08568
PubChem CID	10700
UNII	3FD00JX53J
CompTox Dashboard (EPA)	DTXSID2060177
- InChI: InChI=1S/C5H4O2S/c6-5(7)4-2-1-3-8-4/h1-3H,(H,6,7) Key: QERYCTSHXKAMIS-UHFFFAOYSA-N
- SMILES: C1=CSC(=C1)C(=O)O

Properties
Chemical formula	C_{5}H_{4}O_{2}S
Molar mass	128.15 g·mol^{−1}
Appearance	white solid
Melting point	125–127 °C (257–261 °F; 398–400 K)
- Except where otherwise noted, data are given for materials in their standard state (at 25 °C [77 °F], 100 kPa). Infobox references

Thiophene-2-carboxylic acid is an organic compound with the formula SC_{4}H_{3}CO_{2}H. It is one of two monocarboxylic acids of thiophene, the other being thiophene-3-carboxylic acid. Copper(I) thiophene-2-carboxylate is a catalyst for Ullmann coupling reactions.

== Synthesis ==
It can be prepared by the oxidation of thiophene-2-carboxaldehyde or, more practically, 2-acetylthiophene.

== Applications and reactions ==
Suprofen, which is produced from thiophene-2-carboxylic acid, is the active ingredient in some eye drops.

Upon treatment with LDA, thiophene-2-carboxylic acid undergoes double deprotonation to give the 5-lithio derivative, a precursor to many 5-substituted derivatives.

Thiophene-2-carboxylic acid has been widely studied as a substrate in coupling reactions and olefinations.
