= Canadian Undergraduate Technology Conference =

Canadian student-organized conference

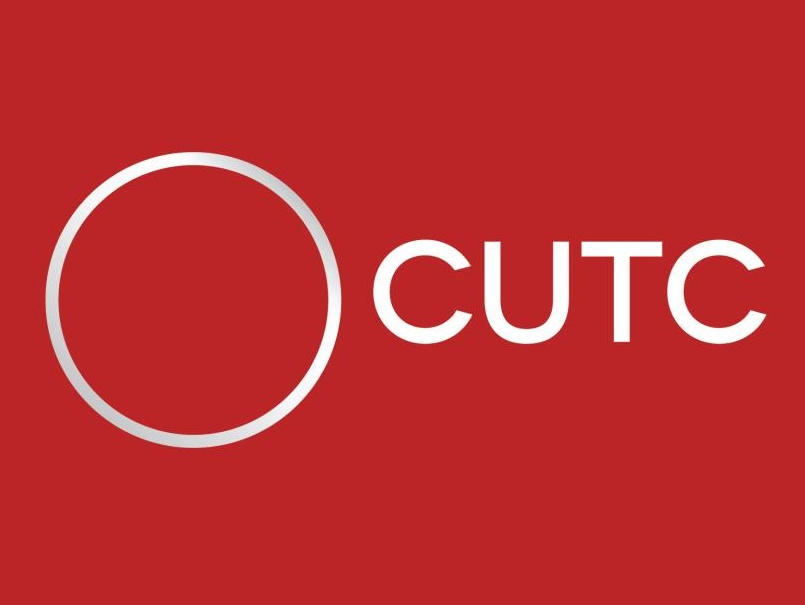
CUTC logo

The Canadian Undergraduate Technology Conference (CUTC) is a Canadian student-organized conference. It concerns itself with all sorts of technology-related fields, such as: engineering, programming, interactive design, electronics, biology, and chemistry. It aims to introduce undergraduate students to the future of technology.

Since its inception in 1999, it has become popular for bringing some of the biggest names in the technology. Over the last decade, the conference has reached 4000+ students in North America, with 150+ top industry partners.

Past partners come from a wide range of backgrounds. They include Deloitte, Microsoft, Nulogy, Sun Microsystems, General Electric, IBM, and CGI Group.

== The Conference ==
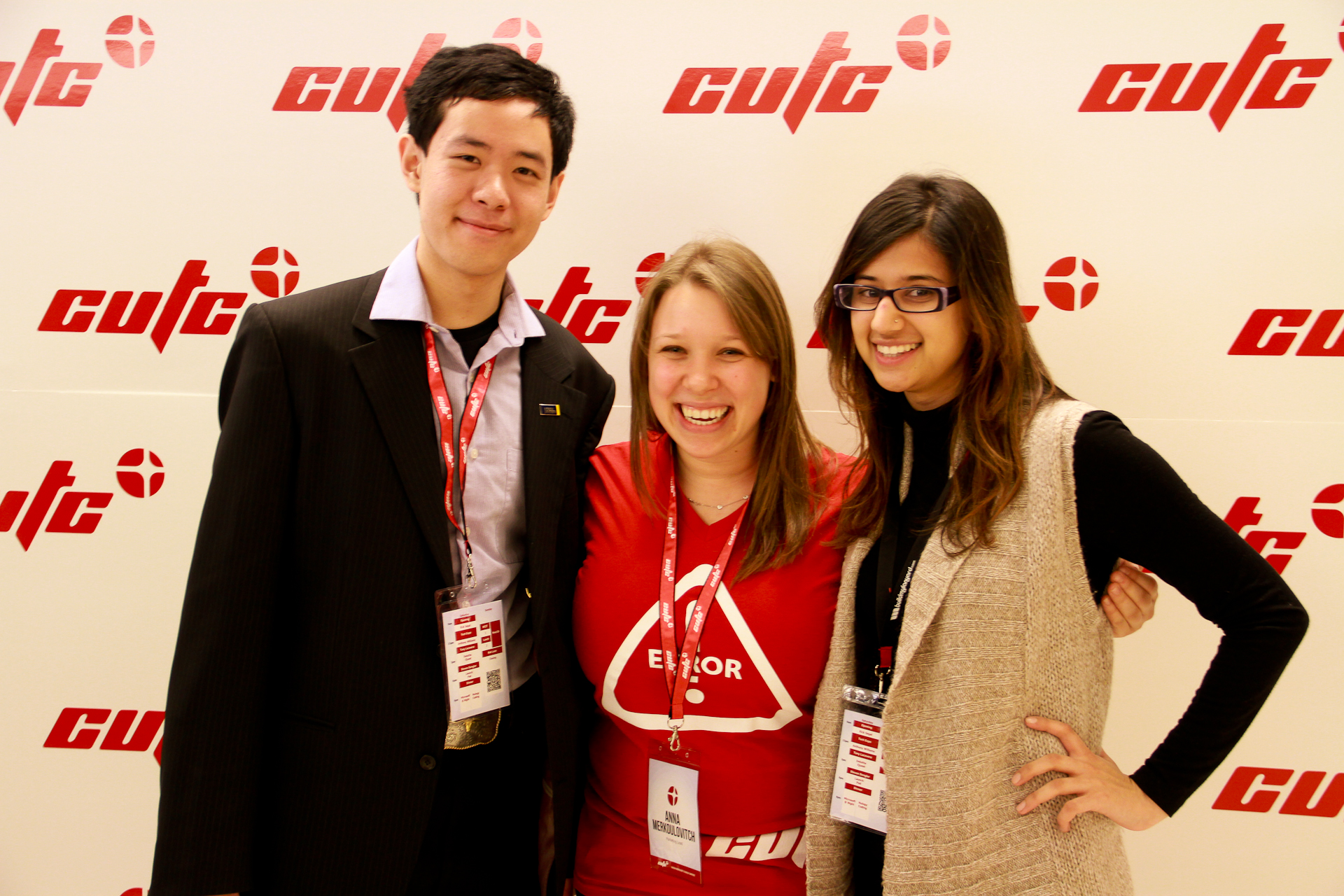
Conference delegates

The conference has a light and relaxed atmosphere. Top tier partners have collaborated with CUTC to create events that engage and challenge the delegates to problem-solve. This can range from hackathons to scavenger hunts. Keynote speakers, most often top industry leaders, share stories of how they came to be where they are today. The breakout sessions are smaller gatherings where experts can share their expertise. Finally, the tech expo is a hands-on showcase that displays some of the most recent and important innovations.

The one- or two-day conference is usually held in major tech-focused cities across Canada, including Vancouver and Toronto. Conferences in different cities are held simultaneously and often have shared speaker sessions. It brings together hundreds each year for the opportunity to listen to successful entrepreneurs, connect with industry leaders, participate in interactive workshops, compete in business and entrepreneurial case competitions, hackathons, and network with their tech-loving peers. Technology is integrated in every aspect of the conference, and delegates have the opportunity to connect through both networking sessions and social media channels.
