= Copper homeostasis protein cutC homolog =

Protein-coding gene in the species Homo sapiens

CUTC
Available structures
PDB	Ortholog search: PDBe RCSB
PDB	List of PDB id codes 3IWP

Identifiers
- Aliases: CUTC, CGI-32, cutC copper transporter
- External IDs: OMIM: 610101; MGI: 1913638; HomoloGene: 9318; GeneCards: CUTC; OMA:CUTC - orthologs

Gene location (Human)
Chr.	Chromosome 10 (human)
Band	10q24.2	Start	99,702,558 bp
Band	10q24.2	End	99,756,134 bp

Gene location (Mouse)
Chr.	Chromosome 19 (mouse)
Band	19|19 C3	Start	43,741,435 bp
Band	19|19 C3	End	43,757,077 bp
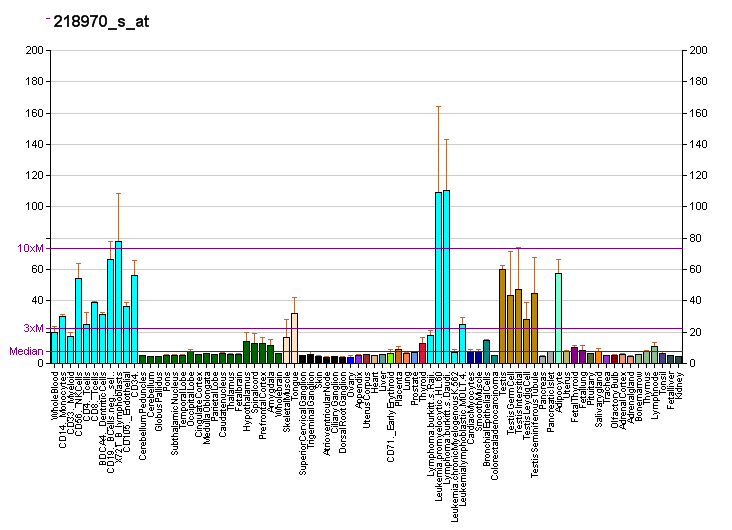
RNA expression pattern
Bgee	Human / Mouse (ortholog); Top expressed in: Skeletal muscle tissue of rectus abdominis; muscle of thigh; biceps brachii; Skeletal muscle tissue of biceps brachii; gastrocnemius muscle; vastus lateralis muscle; triceps brachii muscle; deltoid muscle; glutes; thoracic diaphragm / Top expressed in: spermatid; spermatocyte; muscle of thigh; temporal muscle; right kidney; sternocleidomastoid muscle; proximal tubule; yolk sac; digastric muscle; seminiferous tubule; More reference expression data
BioGPS	More reference expression data
Gene ontology
Molecular function	copper ion binding; protein binding; metal ion binding
Cellular component	cytoplasm; nucleolus; nucleus; nucleoplasm; cytosol
Biological process	copper ion transport; protein tetramerization; copper ion homeostasis
Sources:Amigo / QuickGO
Orthologs
Species	Human	Mouse
Entrez	51076	66388
Ensembl	ENSG00000119929	ENSMUSG00000025193
UniProt	Q9NTM9	Q9D8X1
RefSeq (mRNA)	NM_015960	NM_001113562; NM_025530
RefSeq (protein)	NP_057044	NP_001107034; NP_079806
Location (UCSC)	Chr 10: 99.7 – 99.76 Mb	Chr 19: 43.74 – 43.76 Mb
PubMed search
- Wikidata
View/Edit Human	View/Edit Mouse

Copper homeostasis protein cutC homolog is a protein that in humans is encoded by the CUTC gene.
