= Thiophene =

Sulfur-containing aromatic compound

Full displayed formula of thiophene
Skeletal formula showing numbering convention
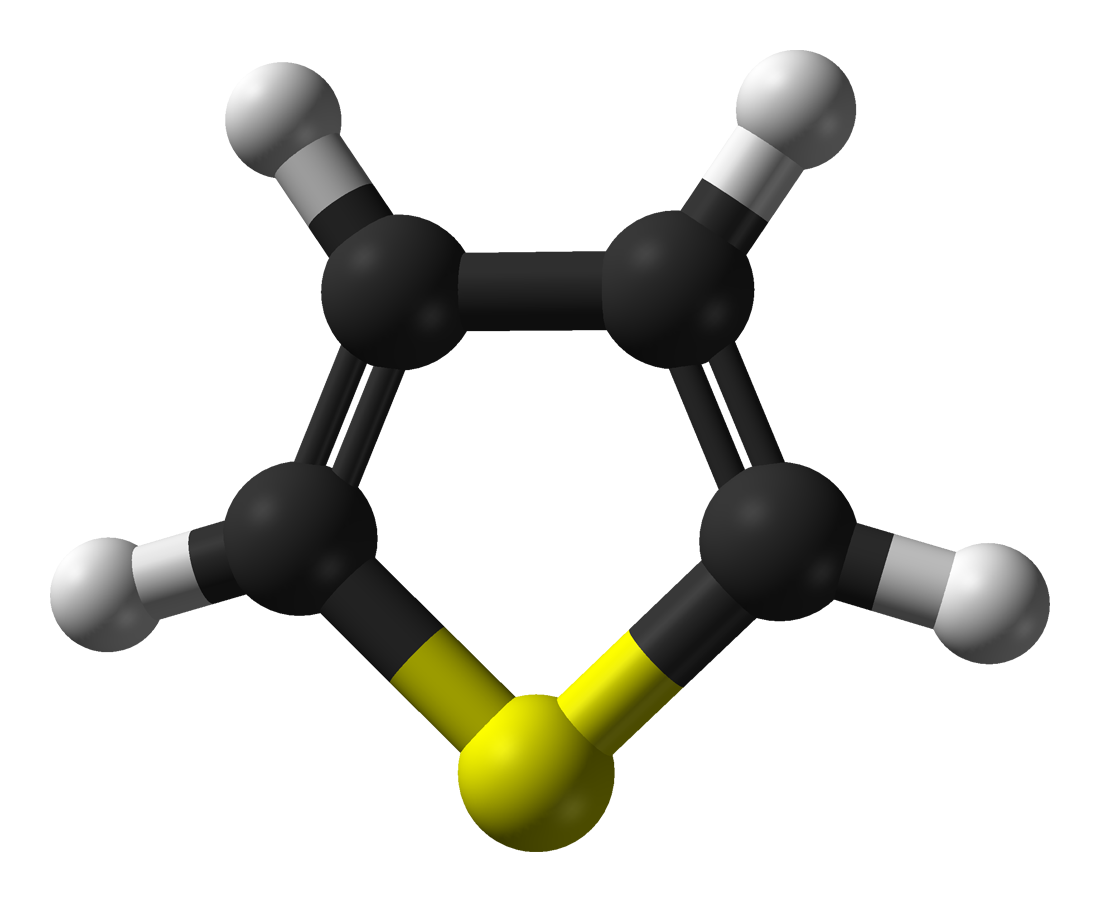
Ball-and-stick model
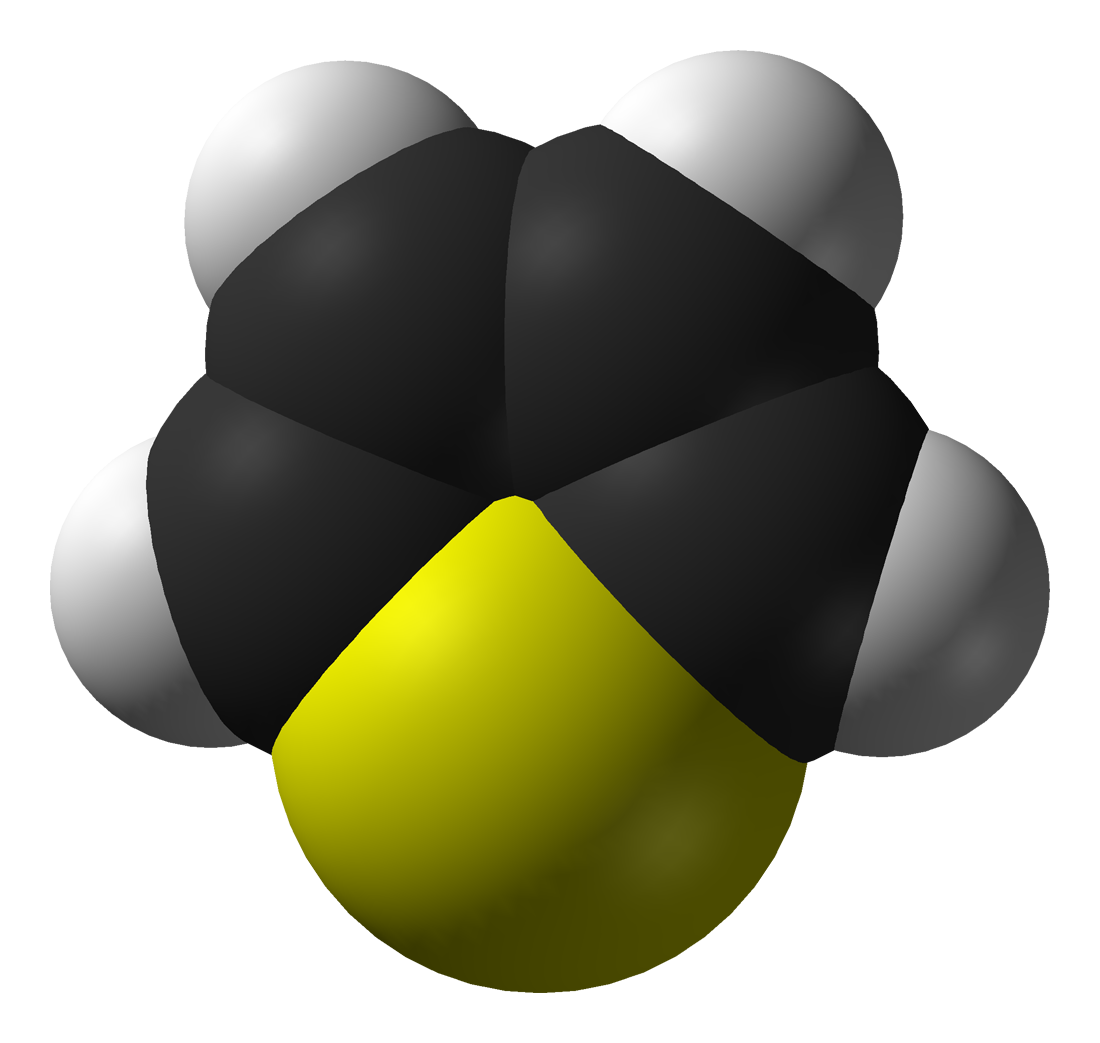
Space-filling model

Names
- Preferred IUPAC name Thiophene
- Other names Thiofuran; Thiacyclopentadiene; Thiole

Identifiers
CAS Number	110-02-1
3D model (JSmol)	Interactive image
ChEBI	CHEBI:30856
ChEMBL	ChEMBL278958
ChemSpider	7739
ECHA InfoCard	100.003.392
PubChem CID	8030
RTECS number	XM7350000
UNII	SMB37IQ40B
CompTox Dashboard (EPA)	DTXSID8026145
- InChI: InChI=1S/C4H4S/c1-2-4-5-3-1/h1-4H Key: YTPLMLYBLZKORZ-UHFFFAOYSA-N; InChI=1/C4H4S/c1-2-4-5-3-1/h1-4H Key: YTPLMLYBLZKORZ-UHFFFAOYAY
- SMILES: c1ccsc1

Properties
Chemical formula	C_{4}H_{4}S
Molar mass	84.14 g·mol^{−1}
Appearance	colorless liquid
Density	1.051 g/mL, liquid
Melting point	−38 °C (−36 °F; 235 K)
Boiling point	84 °C (183 °F; 357 K)
Magnetic susceptibility (χ)	−57.38·10^{−6} cm^{3}/mol
Refractive index (n_{D})	1.5287
Viscosity	0.8712 cP at 0.2 °C; 0.6432 cP at 22.4 °C

Hazards
- Occupational safety and health (OHS/OSH)
Main hazards	Toxic
- GHS labelling
Pictograms	(GHS02: Flammable) (GHS07: Exclamation mark)
Signal word	Danger
Hazard statements	H225, H302, H319, H412
Precautionary statements	P210, P260, P262, P273, P305+P351+P338, P403+P235
NFPA 704 (fire diamond)	2 3 0
Flash point	−1 °C (30 °F; 272 K)
Safety data sheet (SDS)	External MSDS, External MSDS

Related compounds
Related thioethers	Tetrahydrothiophene; Diethyl sulfide
Related compounds	Furan; Selenophene; Pyrrole
- Except where otherwise noted, data are given for materials in their standard state (at 25 °C [77 °F], 100 kPa). verify (what is ?) Infobox references

Thiophene is a heterocyclic compound with the formula C_{4}H_{4}S. Consisting of a planar five-membered ring, it is aromatic as indicated by its extensive substitution reactions. It is a colorless liquid with a benzene-like odor. In most of its reactions, it resembles benzene. Compounds analogous to thiophene include furan (C_{4}H_{4}O), selenophene (C_{4}H_{4}Se) and pyrrole (C_{4}H_{4}NH), which each vary by the heteroatom in the ring.

== Isolation and occurrence ==
Thiophene was discovered by Viktor Meyer in 1882 as a contaminant in benzene. It was observed that isatin (an indole) forms a blue dye if it is mixed with sulfuric acid and crude benzene. The formation of the blue indophenin had long been believed to be a reaction of benzene itself. Viktor Meyer was able to isolate thiophene as the actual substance responsible for this reaction.

Thiophene and especially its derivatives occur in petroleum, sometimes in concentrations up to 1–3%. The thiophenic content of oil and coal is removed via the hydrodesulfurization (HDS) process.

=== On Mars ===
Thiophene derivatives have been detected at nanomole levels in 3.5 billions year old Martian soil sediments (Murray Formation, Pahrump Hills) by the rover Curiosity at Gale crater (Mars) between 2012 and 2017.

== Synthesis and production ==
Reflecting their high stabilities, thiophenes arise from many reactions involving sulfur sources and hydrocarbons, especially unsaturated ones. The first synthesis of thiophene by Meyer, reported the same year that he made his discovery, involves acetylene and elemental sulfur. Thiophenes are classically prepared by the reaction of 1,4-diketones, diesters, or dicarboxylates with sulfidizing reagents such as P_{4}S_{10} such as in the Paal-Knorr thiophene synthesis. Specialized thiophenes can be synthesized similarly using Lawesson's reagent as the sulfidizing agent, or via the Gewald reaction, which involves the condensation of two esters in the presence of elemental sulfur. Another method is the Volhard–Erdmann cyclization.

Thiophene is produced on a modest scale of around 2,000 metric tons per year worldwide. Production involves the vapor phase reaction of a sulfur source, typically carbon disulfide, and a C-4 source, typically butanol. These reagents are contacted with an oxide catalyst at 500–550 °C.

== Properties and structure ==
Thiophene is a colorless liquid at room temperature. The high reactivity of thiophene toward sulfonation is the basis for the separation of thiophene from benzene, which are difficult to separate by distillation due to their similar boiling points (4 °C difference at ambient pressure). Like benzene, thiophene forms an azeotrope with ethanol.

The molecule is flat; the bond angle at the sulfur is around 93°, the C–C–S angle is around 109°, and the other two carbons have a bond angle around 114°. The C–C bonds to the carbons adjacent to the sulfur are about 1.34 Å, the C–S bond length is around 1.70 Å, and the other C–C bond is about 1.41 Å.

== Reactivity ==
Thiophene is considered to be aromatic, although theoretical calculations suggest that the degree of aromaticity is less than that of benzene. The "electron pairs" on sulfur are significantly delocalized in the pi electron system. As a consequence of its aromaticity, thiophene does not exhibit the properties seen for conventional sulfides. For example, the sulfur atom resists alkylation and oxidation.

=== Oxidation ===
Oxidation can occur both at sulfur, giving a thiophene S-oxide, as well as at the 2,3-double bond, giving the thiophene 2,3-epoxide, followed by subsequent NIH shift rearrangement.

Oxidation with trifluoroperacetic acid demonstrates both reaction pathways. The major pathway forms the S-oxide as an intermediate, which undergoes subsequent Diels-Alder-type dimerisation and further oxidation, forming a mixture of sulfoxide and sulfone products with a combined yield of 83% (based on NMR evidence):

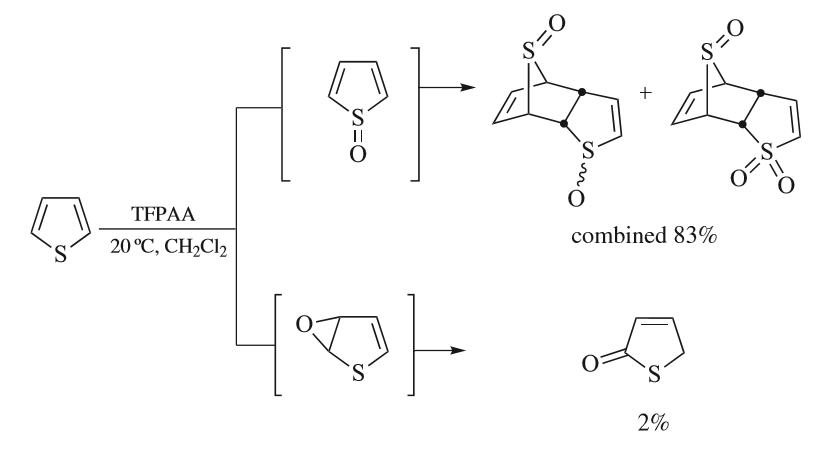

In the minor reaction pathway, a Prilezhaev epoxidation results in the formation of thiophene-2,3-epoxide that rapidly rearranges to the isomer thiophene-2-one. Trapping experiments demonstrate that this pathway is not a side reaction from the S-oxide intermediate, while isotopic labeling with deuterium confirm that a 1,2-hydride shift occurs and thus that a cationic intermediate is involved. If the reaction mixture is not anhydrous, this minor reaction pathway is suppressed as water acts as a competing base.

Oxidation may be relevant to the metabolic activation of various thiophene-containing drugs, such as tienilic acid and the investigational anticancer drug OSI-930.

=== Alkylation ===
Although the sulfur atom is relatively unreactive, the flanking carbon centers, the 2- and 5-positions, are highly susceptible to attack by electrophiles. Halogens give initially 2-halo derivatives followed by 2,5-dihalothiophenes; perhalogenation is easily accomplished to give C_{4}X_{4}S (X = Cl, Br, I). Thiophene brominates 10^{7} times faster than does benzene. Acetylation occurs readily to give 2-acetylthiophene, precursor to thiophene-2-carboxylic acid and thiophene-2-acetic acid.

Chloromethylation and chloroethylation occur readily at the 2,5-positions. Reduction of the chloromethyl product gives 2-methylthiophene. Hydrolysis followed by dehydration of the chloroethyl species gives 2-vinylthiophene.

=== Desulfurization ===
Desulfurization of thiophene with Raney nickel affords butane. When coupled with the easy 2,5-difunctionalization of thiophene, desulfurization provides a route to 1,4-disubstituted butanes.

=== Polymerization ===
The polymer formed by linking thiophene through its 2,5 positions is called polythiophene. Polymerization is conducted by oxidation using electrochemical methods (electropolymerization) or electron-transfer reagents. An idealized equation is shown:

n C_{4}H_{4}S → (C_{4}H_{2}S)_{n} + 2n H^{+} + 2n e^{−}

Polythiophene itself has poor processing properties and so is little studied. More useful are polymers derived from thiophenes substituted at the 3- and 3- and 4- positions, such as EDOT (ethylenedioxythiophene). Polythiophenes become electrically conductive upon partial oxidation, i.e. they obtain some of the characteristics typically observed in metals.

=== Coordination chemistry ===
Thiophene exhibits little sulfide-like character, but it does serve as a pi-ligand forming piano stool complexes such as Cr(η^{5}-C_{4}H_{4}S)(CO)_{3}.

== Thiophene derivatives ==
Some Thiophenes

Thieno[3,2-b]thiophene, one of the four thienothiophenes

2,2'-Bithiophene

3,4-Ethylenedioxythiophene (EDOT), the precursor to commercial antistatic and electrochromic displays

Benzothiophene

=== Thienyl ===
Upon deprotonation, thiophene converts to the thienyl group, C_{4}H_{3}S^{−}. Although the anion per se does not exist, the organolithium derivatives do. Thus reaction of thiophene with butyl lithium gives 2-lithiothiophene, also called 2-thienyllithium. This reagent reacts with electrophiles to give thienyl derivatives, such as the thiol. Oxidation of thienyllithium gives 2,2'-dithienyl, (C_{4}H_{3}S)_{2}. Thienyl lithium is employed in the preparation of higher order mixed cuprates. Coupling of thienyl anion equivalents gives dithienyl, an analogue of biphenyl.

=== Ring-fused thiophenes ===
Fusion of thiophene with a benzene ring gives benzothiophene. Fusion with two benzene rings gives either dibenzothiophene (DBT) or naphthothiophene. Fusion of a pair of thiophene rings gives isomers of thienothiophene.

== Uses ==
Thiophenes are important heterocyclic compounds that are widely used as building blocks in many agrochemicals and pharmaceuticals. The benzene ring of a biologically active compound may often be replaced by a thiophene without loss of activity. This is seen in examples such as the NSAID lornoxicam, the thiophene analog of piroxicam, and sufentanil, the thiophene analog of fentanyl.
