= Thiophene-3-acetic acid =

Names
- Preferred IUPAC name (Thiophen-3-yl)acetic acid
- Other names 3-TAA, Thiophen-3-yl-acetic acid

Identifiers
| CAS Number | 6964-21-2 |
| 3D model (JSmol) | Interactive image |
| ChemSpider | 21886 |
| ECHA InfoCard | 100.027.424 |
| EC Number | 230-166-1 |
| PubChem CID | 23404 |
| UNII | 3B235D2C4J |
| CompTox Dashboard (EPA) | DTXSID10219904 |
- InChI: InChI=1S/C6H6O2S/c7-6(8)3-5-1-2-9-4-5/h1-2,4H,3H2,(H,7,8) Key: RCNOGGGBSSVMAS-UHFFFAOYSA-N
- SMILES: C1=CSC=C1CC(=O)O

Properties
| Chemical formula | C_{6}H_{6}O_{2}S |
| Molar mass | 142.18 g/mol |
| Appearance | colorless or white solid |
| Density | 1.336 g/cm^{3} |
| Melting point | 79–80 °C (174–176 °F; 352–353 K) |
- Except where otherwise noted, data are given for materials in their standard state (at 25 °C [77 °F], 100 kPa). verify (what is ?) Infobox references

Thiophene-3-acetic acid is an organosulfur compound with the formula HO_{2}CCH_{2}C_{4}H_{3}S. It is a white solid. It is one of two isomers of thiophene acetic acid, the other being thiophene-2-acetic acid.

Thiophene-3-acetic acid has attracted attention as a precursor to functionalized derivatives of polythiophene.
