= Selenophene =

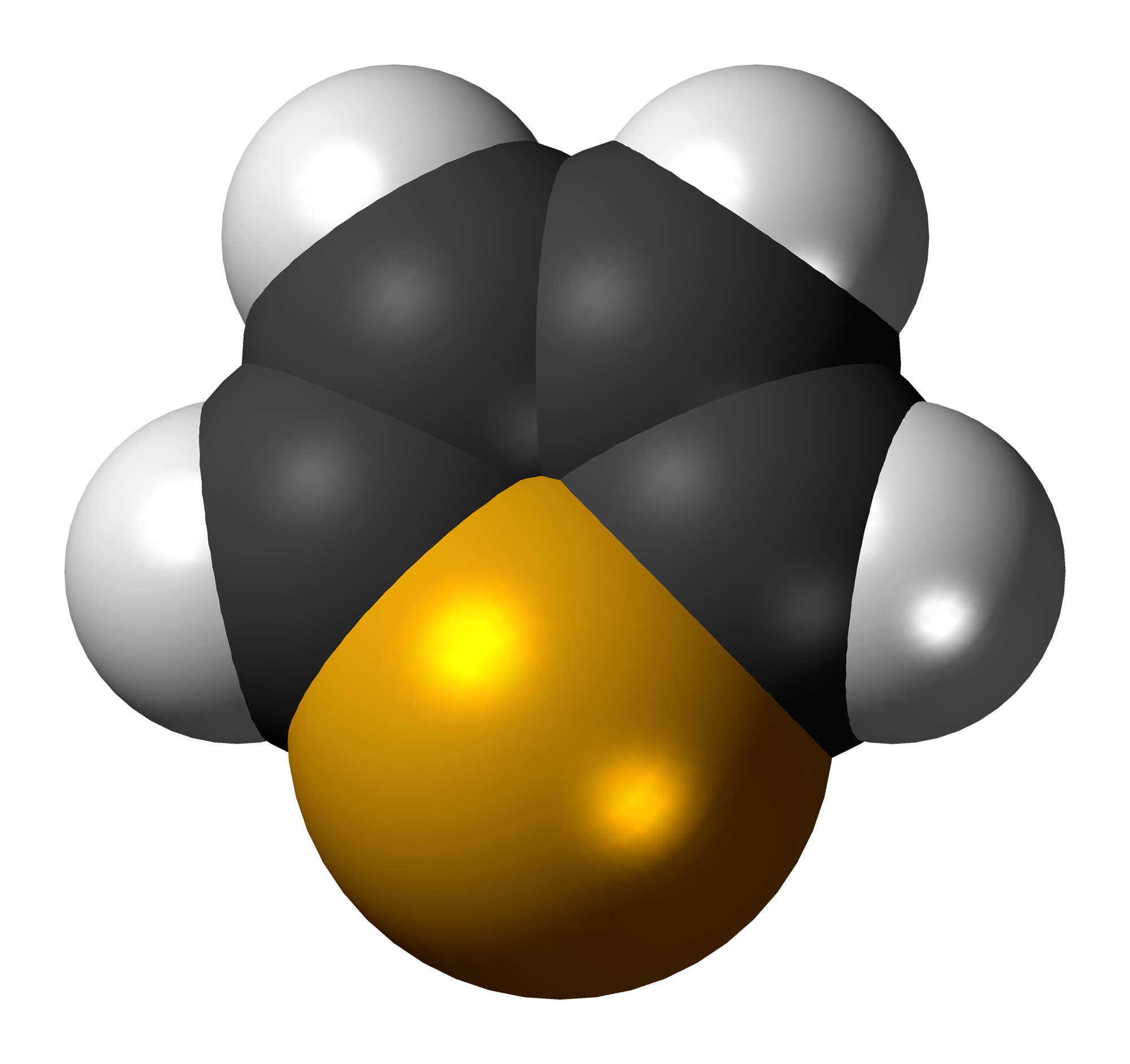

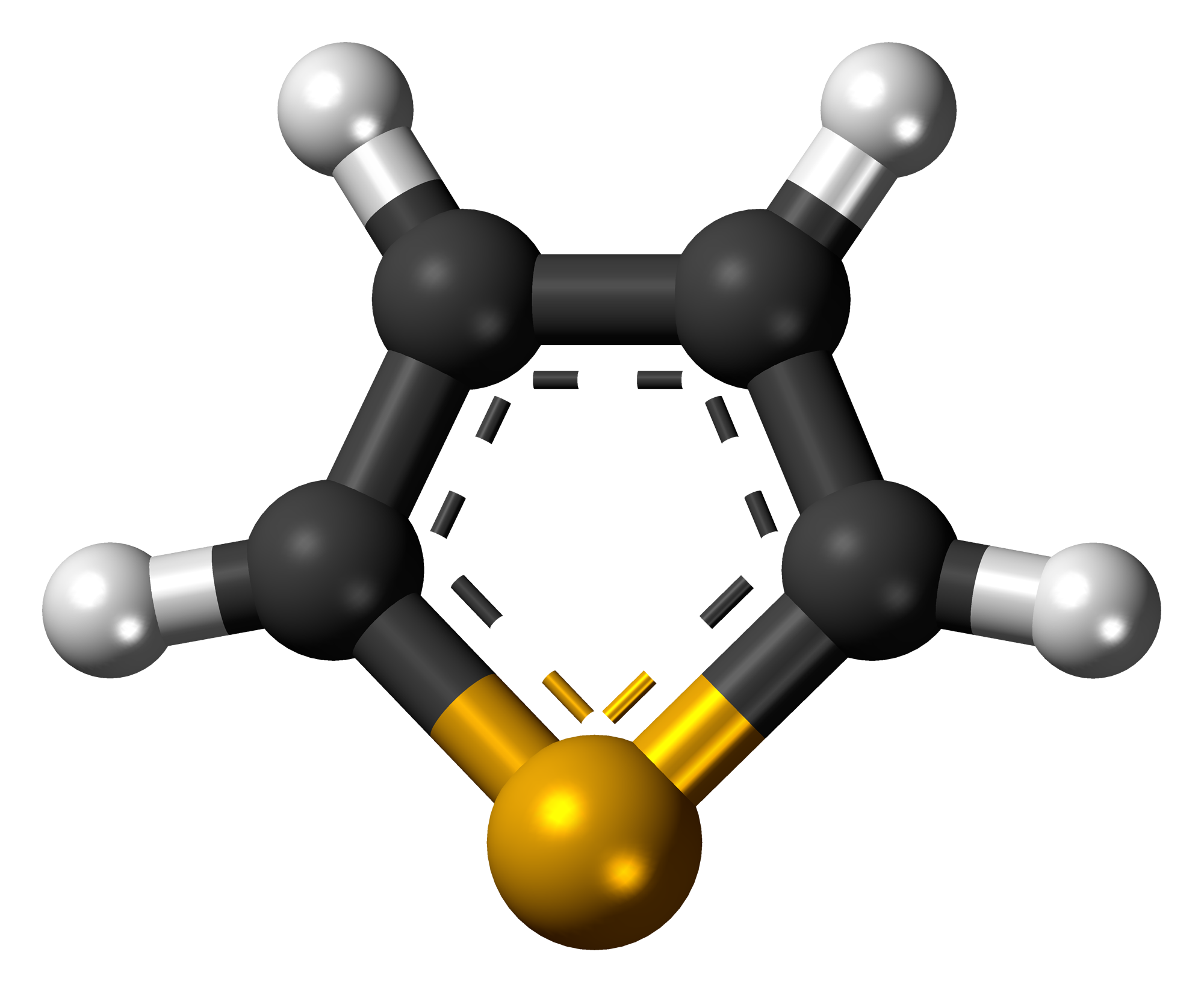

Names
- Preferred IUPAC name Selenophene

Identifiers
CAS Number	288-05-1
Beilstein Reference	103223
ChEBI	CHEBI:30857
ChemSpider	119907
ECHA InfoCard	100.157.009
Gmelin Reference	100994
PubChem CID	136130
UNII	UYZ3M5T8L7
CompTox Dashboard (EPA)	DTXSID20182978
- InChI: InChI=1S/C4H4Se/c1-2-4-5-3-1/h1-4H Key: MABNMNVCOAICNO-UHFFFAOYSA-N
- SMILES: C1=C[Se]C=C1

Properties
Chemical formula	C_{4}H_{4}Se
Molar mass	131.047 g·mol^{−1}
Appearance	colorless liquid
Density	1.52 g/cm^{3}
Melting point	−38 °C (−36 °F; 235 K)
Boiling point	110 °C (230 °F; 383 K)
Refractive index (n_{D})	1.58

Hazards
- GHS labelling
Pictograms	(GHS02: Flammable) (GHS06: Toxic) (GHS08: Health hazard) (GHS09: Environmental hazard)
Signal word	Danger
Hazard statements	H225, H301, H331, H373, H410
Precautionary statements	P210, P233, P240, P241, P242, P243, P260, P264, P270, P271, P273, P280, P301+P310, P303+P361+P353, P304+P340, P311, P314, P321, P330, P370+P378, P391, P403+P233, P403+P235, P405, P501

Related compounds
Related more saturated	selenolane 2-selenolene 3-selenolene
Related compounds	furan thiophene tellurophene
- Except where otherwise noted, data are given for materials in their standard state (at 25 °C [77 °F], 100 kPa). Infobox references

Selenophene is an organic compound with the chemical formula C_{4}H_{4}Se. It is an unsaturated compound containing a five-member ring with four carbon atoms and one selenium atom. It is a selenium analog of furan (C_{4}H_{4}O) and thiophene (C_{4}H_{4}S). A colorless liquid, it is one of the more common selenium heterocycles.

== Nomenclature ==
Atoms in selenophene are numbered sequentially around the ring, starting with the selenium atom as number 1 following normal systematic nomenclature rules. Oxidized forms include selenophene 1,1-dioxide. Related ring structures include those with only one double bond (2-selenolene and 3-selenolene) and the fully saturated structure selenolane.

== Production ==
Mazza and Solazzo reported the first confirmed synthesis in 1927. By treating selenium with acetylene and at about 300 °C yields up to 15% selenophene were obtained. Benzoselenophene (analogue of benzothiophene) was also produced.

Substituted selenophenes can be made using a Fiesselman procedure in which a β-chloro-aldehyde reacts with sodium selenide, and then ethyl bromoacetate.

== Properties ==
The selenophene molecule is flat. Being aromatic, it undergoes electrophilic substitution reactions. As for thiophene, electrophiles tend to attack at the carbon positions next to the chalcogen. Such reactions are slower than that of furan, but faster than thiophene.
