= Copper(I) thiophene-2-carboxylate =

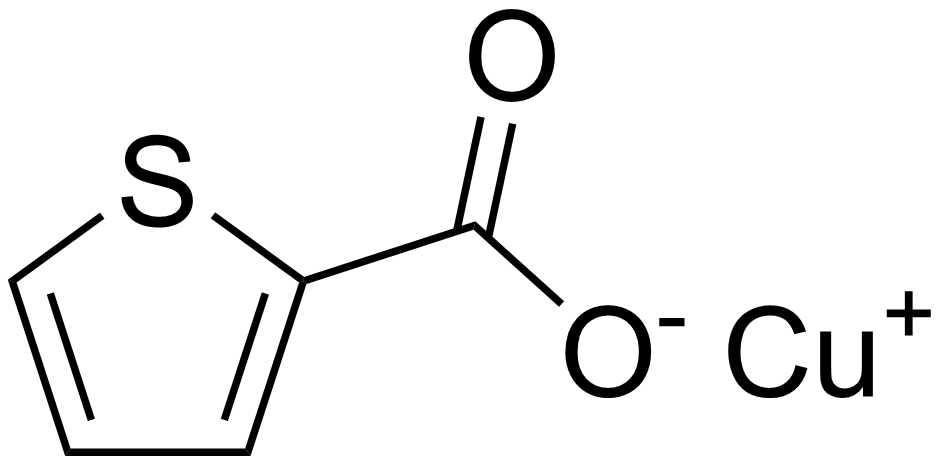

Names
- IUPAC name Copper(I) thiophene-2-carboxylate
- Other names CuTC

Identifiers
CAS Number	68986-76-5
3D model (JSmol)	Interactive image; Interactive image
ChemSpider	9369899
ECHA InfoCard	100.161.358
EC Number	633-277-7
PubChem CID	11194830
UNII	7519WBL07L
CompTox Dashboard (EPA)	DTXSID50894113
- InChI: InChI=1S/C5H4O2S.Cu/c6-5(7)4-2-1-3-8-4;/h1-3H,(H,6,7);/q;+1/p-1 Key: SFJMFSWCBVEHBA-UHFFFAOYSA-M; InChI=1/C5H4O2S.Cu/c6-5(7)4-2-1-3-8-4;/h1-3H,(H,6,7);/q;+1/p-1 Key: SFJMFSWCBVEHBA-REWHXWOFAY
- SMILES: O=C([O-])C1=CC=CS1.[Cu+]; [Cu+].[O-]C(=O)c1sccc1

Properties
Chemical formula	C_{5}H_{3}CuO_{2}S
Molar mass	190.68 g·mol^{−1}

Hazards
- Occupational safety and health (OHS/OSH)
Main hazards	Irritant
- GHS labelling
Pictograms	(GHS07: Exclamation mark)
Signal word	Warning
Hazard statements	H315, H319, H335
Precautionary statements	P261, P264, P271, P280, P302+P352, P304+P340, P305+P351+P338, P312, P321, P332+P313, P337+P313, P362, P403+P233, P405, P501
- NIOSH (US health exposure limits)
PEL (Permissible)	TWA 1 mg/m^{3} (as Cu)
REL (Recommended)	TWA 1 mg/m^{3} (as Cu)
IDLH (Immediate danger)	TWA 100 mg/m^{3} (as Cu)
- Except where otherwise noted, data are given for materials in their standard state (at 25 °C [77 °F], 100 kPa). verify (what is ?) Infobox references

Copper(I) thiophene-2-carboxylate or CuTC is a coordination complex derived from copper and thiophene-2-carboxylic acid. It is used as a reagent to promote the Ullmann reaction between aryl halides.

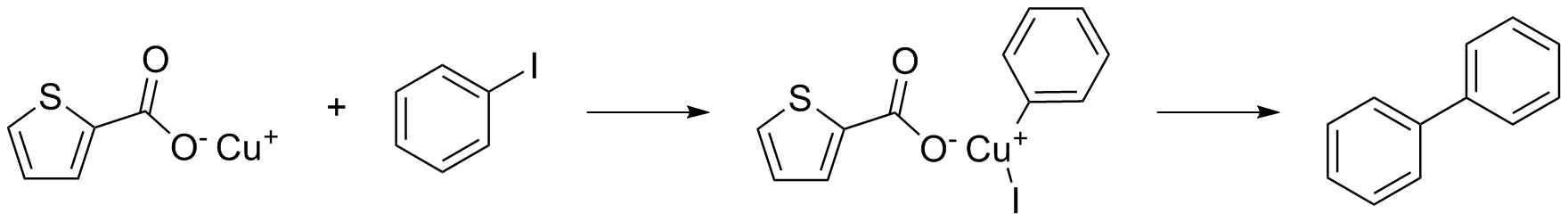
CuTC catalyzed Ullmann coupling
