= Isopromethazine =

Chemical compound

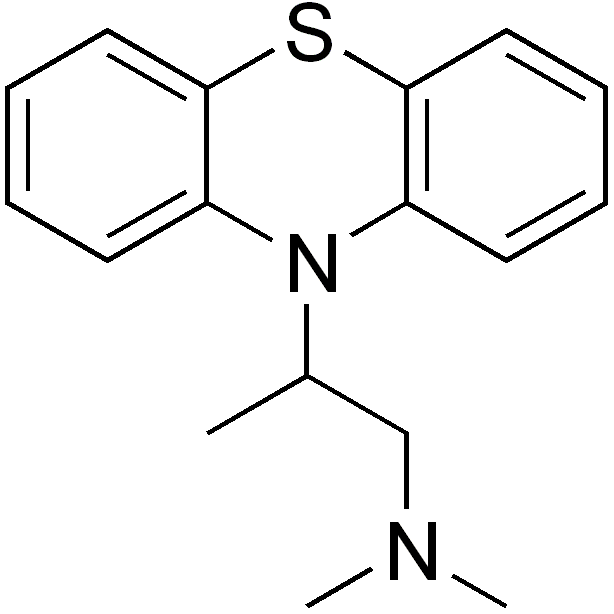

Clinical data
- MedlinePlus: a682284
- ATC code: none

Identifiers
- IUPAC name: N,N-Dimethyl-2-(10H-phenothiazin-10-yl)propan-1-amine
- CAS Number: 303-14-0
- PubChem CID: 110669
- ChemSpider: 99332
- UNII: 044033O3TY
- CompTox Dashboard (EPA): DTXSID10952662
- ECHA InfoCard: 100.117.754

Chemical and physical data
- Formula: C_{17}H_{20}N_{2}S
- Molar mass: 284.42 g·mol^{−1}
- 3D model (JSmol): Interactive image
- SMILES: CC(CN(C)C)N1C2=CC=CC=C2SC3=CC=CC=C31
- InChI: InChI=1S/C17H20N2S/c1-13(12-18(2)3)19-14-8-4-6-10-16(14)20-17-11-7-5-9-15(17)19/h4-11,13H,12H2,1-3H3; Key:CGNHCKZJGQDWBG-UHFFFAOYSA-N

Isopromethazine is an antihistamine and anticholinergic of the phenothiazine chemical class. It is an enantiomer of promethazine.

== See also ==
- Promethazine
