= 2-Acetylthiophene =

Names
- Preferred IUPAC name 1-(Thiophen-2-yl)ethan-1-one
- Other names 2-acetothienone, methyl thienyl ketone

Identifiers
CAS Number	88-15-3
3D model (JSmol)	Interactive image
ChEBI	CHEBI:179841
ChEMBL	ChEMBL401911
ChemSpider	6654
ECHA InfoCard	100.001.640
EC Number	201-804-6
PubChem CID	6920
UNII	5ASO208T20
CompTox Dashboard (EPA)	DTXSID2058960
- InChI: InChI=1S/C6H6OS/c1-5(7)6-3-2-4-8-6/h2-4H,1H3 Key: WYJOVVXUZNRJQY-UHFFFAOYSA-N
- SMILES: CC(=O)C1=CC=CS1

Properties
Chemical formula	C_{6}H_{6}OS
Molar mass	126.17 g·mol^{−1}
Appearance	Yellow liquid
Melting point	9 °C (48 °F; 282 K)
Boiling point	214 °C (417 °F; 487 K)

Hazards
- GHS labelling
Pictograms	(GHS07: Exclamation mark)
Signal word	Warning
Hazard statements	H302, H312, H332
Precautionary statements	P261, P264, P270, P271, P280, P301+P312, P302+P352, P304+P312, P304+P340, P312, P322, P330, P361, P363, P405, P501
- Except where otherwise noted, data are given for materials in their standard state (at 25 °C [77 °F], 100 kPa). Infobox references

2-Acetylthiophene is an organosulfur compound with the formula CH_{3}C(O)C_{4}H_{3}S. A yellow liquid, it is the more useful of the two isomers of acetylthiophene. It is of commercial interest as a precursor to both thiophene-2-carboxylic acid and thiophene-2-acetic acid. It is prepared by the reaction of thiophene with acetyl chloride in the presence of stannic chloride.
