= Principle of least motion =

In organic chemistry, the principle of least motion is the hypothesis that when multiple products with different chemical structures could theoretically form in a chemical reaction, the more likely to form tends to be the one requiring the least change in electronic structure or the smallest change in atomic positions.
