= Phenylsulfinic acid =

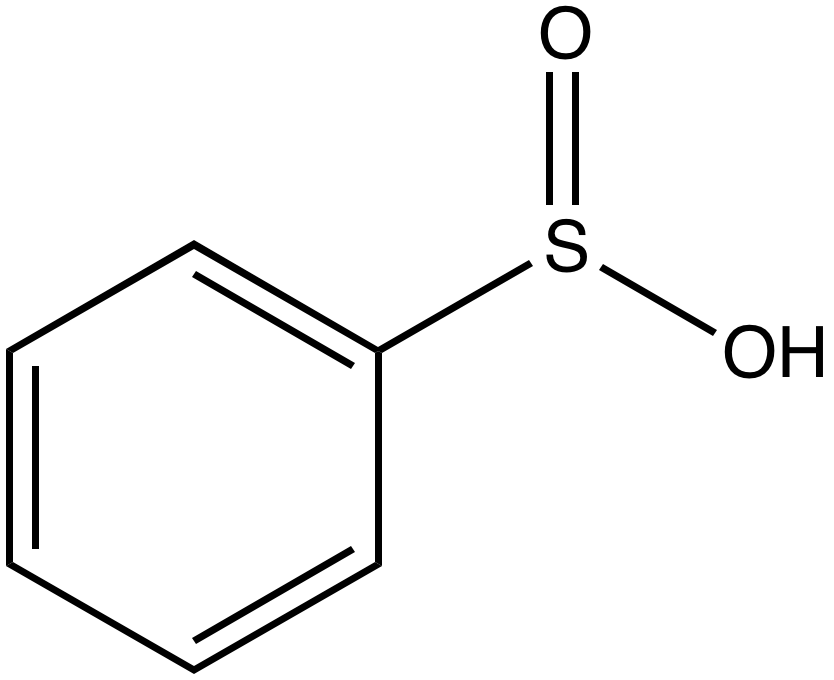

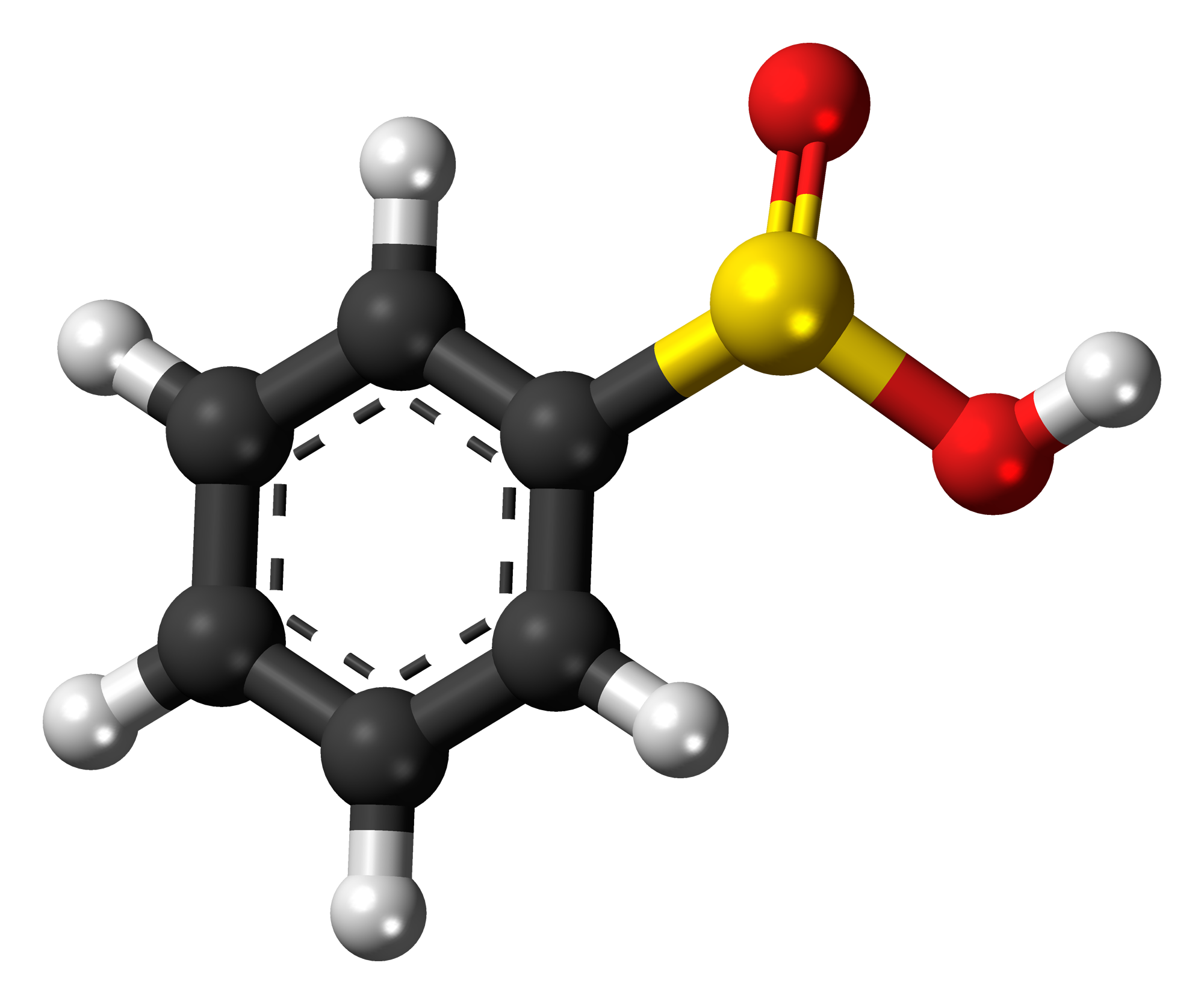

Names
- Preferred IUPAC name Benzenesulfinic acid
- Other names: Phenylsulfinic acid; Phenyl sulfinic acid; Benzene sulfinic acid

Identifiers
CAS Number	618-41-7
3D model (JSmol)	Interactive image
ChemSpider	11560
ECHA InfoCard	100.009.591
PubChem CID	12057
UNII	G9560D97PI
CompTox Dashboard (EPA)	DTXSID90210797
- InChI: InChI=1S/C6H6O2S/c7-9(8)6-4-2-1-3-5-6/h1-5H,(H,7,8) Key: JEHKKBHWRAXMCH-UHFFFAOYSA-N; InChI=1/C6H6O2S/c7-9(8)6-4-2-1-3-5-6/h1-5H,(H,7,8) Key: JEHKKBHWRAXMCH-UHFFFAOYAY
- SMILES: C1=CC=C(C=C1)S(=O)O

Properties
Chemical formula	C_{6}H_{6}O_{2}S
Molar mass	142.17 g·mol^{−1}
Appearance	Colorless prisms
Density	1.45 g/cm^{3}
Melting point	83 to 84 °C (181 to 183 °F; 356 to 357 K)
Acidity (pK_{a})	2.76 (H_{2}O)
- Except where otherwise noted, data are given for materials in their standard state (at 25 °C [77 °F], 100 kPa). verify (what is ?) Infobox references

Phenylsulfinic acid is an organosulfur compound with the formula C_{6}H_{5}SO_{2}H. It is a colorless or white crystalline solid that is usually stored in the form of its sodium salt. In aqueous solution it is strongly acidic and is easily oxidized in air. Phenylsulfinic acid and its esters are chiral.

== Acidity ==
There is a large range of pK_{a} values in the literature, with most authors giving a value of around 1.30. This inconsistency can be explained by differences in ionic strength between quoted values. By measuring the pK_{a} at various ionic strengths and extrapolating to zero ionic strength, the pK_{a} of phenylsulfinic acid was determined to be 2.76. This makes phenylsulfinic acid a stronger acid than its corresponding carboxylic acid, benzoic acid (pK_{a} = 4.2), but weaker than its corresponding sulfonic acid, benzenesulfonic acid (pK_{a} = −6.5).

== Preparation ==
Phenylsulfinic acid can be prepared in several ways, most easily through reduction of sulfonyl chlorides with zinc dust or iron. However other starting materials can be used. Due to the air sensitivity of this compound it is often formed as a salt.

2 C_{6}H_{5}SO_{2}Cl + 2 Zn → (C_{6}H_{5}SO_{2})_{2}Zn + ZnCl_{2}
(C_{6}H_{5}SO_{2})_{2}Zn + Na_{2}CO_{3} → 2 C_{6}H_{5}SO_{2}Na + ZnCO_{3}

A convenient method is the reduction of the sulfonyl chloride or sulfonyl fluoride with sodium sulfite, producing the acid instead of a salt:

C_{6}H_{5}SO_{2}Cl + Na_{2}SO_{3} + H_{2}O → C_{6}H_{5}SO_{2}H + NaCl + NaHSO_{4}

Many other methods have been reported for production of sulfinic acids such as the use tin(II) chloride, or the Grignard reagent with sulfur dioxide. The preparation of sulfinic acids by the oxidation of thiols is difficult due to overoxidation.

== Properties ==
In sulfinic acids, sulfur has the +4 oxidation state. They are prone to oxidation to sulphonic acids as well as reduction via sulphenic acids (+2) to thiols.

Sulphinic acid derivatives disproportionate in the presence of acid:

2 PhSO_{2}H → PhSO_{2}SOPh + H_{2}O
PhSO_{2}SOPh → PhSO_{2}• + PhSO → PhSO_{3}SPh
PhSO_{3}SPh + PhSO2H → PhSO_{3}H + PhSO_{2}SPh

When phenylsulfinic acid reacts with sulfur to give thiosulfinates and thiosulfinic acids.

== Use ==
The main use of phenylsulfinic acid is for the asymmetric synthesis of carbon-carbon bonds due to its ability to stabilize negative charges on an adjacent carbon atom. Phenylsulfinic acid has been a component for electroplating of palladium alloys.
