= Thiophene-2-acetic acid =

Names
- Other names T2AA, 2-Thiopheneacetic acid, 2-Thienylacetic acid

Identifiers
CAS Number	1918-77-0
3D model (JSmol)	Interactive image
Beilstein Reference	114551
ChEBI	CHEBI:45807
ChemSpider	15174
ECHA InfoCard	100.016.037
EC Number	217-639-8
Gmelin Reference	101935
KEGG	C02595
PubChem CID	15970
UNII	A8S4F49X7A
CompTox Dashboard (EPA)	DTXSID5062059
- InChI: InChI=1S/C6H6O2S/c7-6(8)4-5-2-1-3-9-5/h1-3H,4H2,(H,7,8) Key: SMJRBWINMFUUDS-UHFFFAOYSA-N
- SMILES: C1=CSC(=C1)CC(=O)O

Properties
Chemical formula	C_{6}H_{6}O_{2}S
Molar mass	142.17 g·mol^{−1}
Appearance	White solid

Hazards
- GHS labelling
Pictograms	(GHS05: Corrosive)
Signal word	Danger
Hazard statements	H314
Precautionary statements	P260, P264, P280, P301+P330+P331, P303+P361+P353, P304+P340, P305+P351+P338, P310, P321, P363, P405, P501
- Except where otherwise noted, data are given for materials in their standard state (at 25 °C [77 °F], 100 kPa). Infobox references

Thiophene-2-acetic acid is the organosulfur compound with the formula HO_{2}CCH_{2}C_{4}H_{3}S. Together with thiophene-3-acetic acid, it is one of two isomeric thiophene acetic acids.

== Preparation and use ==
It is prepared from 2-acetylthiophene.

It is a precursor to the antibiotics cephaloridine and cephalothin.
