= Lumena =

Chinese mining and manufacturing company

China Lumena New Materials Corp
- Type: Public
- Traded as: SEHK: 67
- Industry: Mining, plastics, laxatives
- Headquarters: Chengdu, Sichuan, China
- Products: Laxatives, PPS resin, PPS compounds and PPS fiber

China Lumena New Materials (commonly called Lumena) is a Chinese mining and manufacturing company primarily engaged in the production of polyphenylene sulfide (PPS), an industrial plastic. According to a market research report in 2016, the company is among the largest producers of PPS.

Lumena mines the glauberite and associated class of minerals that is the raw ingredient used by the company to manufacture PPS and thenardite products including laxatives.

== History ==
The company traces its origins to 1952.

In June 2009, the company raised US$149 million in an IPO on the Hong Kong Stock Exchange. Although the company had planned to launch an IPO in 2008, the Sichuan earthquake that year delayed the plans.

The Hong Kong listed company was suspended from trading by the exchange after Glaucus, a short seller investment research firm, published a report that alleged sales stated by the company were fraudulently inflated and its claim to have the most production capacity volume was misleading. Following turmoil for the company created by the report, on January 19, 2015, one of its creditors, Taiwan-based Mega Bank, filed a winding up petition against Lumena to institute involuntary insolvency proceedings for the company before the Grand Court of the Cayman Islands.

== Mining ==
Lumena is vertically integrated. From two captive mines in Sichuan at the Dahongshan Mining Area and the Guangji Mining Area the company mines glauberite and associated minerals, which are then used to manufacture natural thenardite products and PPS, the two product segments of the company.

The company announced the acquisition in June 2011 of two mining companies in Meishan, Sichuan, but canceled the planned acquisition in announcement in April 2012.

== Product segments ==
=== PPS ===
Lumena is one of a handful of manufacturers of PPS, a plastic with several engineering applications, along with competitors including Solvay (which bought the PPS business from Chevron Philips), Chengdu Letian, DIC Corporation, Kureha, Fortron (a joint venture between Kureha and Ticona), Toray Industries, and Tosoh.

The PPS line of business began after the acquisition in 2010 of Sino Polymer New Materials Co., Ltd., a PPS manufacturer, that owned and operated two plants in Deyang and Chengdu in Sichuan. The goal behind the acquisition was to build a vertically integrated company as one of the main feedstocks in producing PPS is thenardite.

=== Thenardite ===
Derived from the company's mines, the other product segment of the company is natural thenardite products, which is mainly divided into medical thenardite or powder thenardite. The edible medical thenardite is used as a laxative and anti-inflammatory agent while powder thenardite is an ingredient of powdered laundry detergent. Procter & Gamble is a major buyer of powdered thenardite from the company, using it to make laundry detergent.
