= Polyaniline nanofibers =

Form of polyaniline

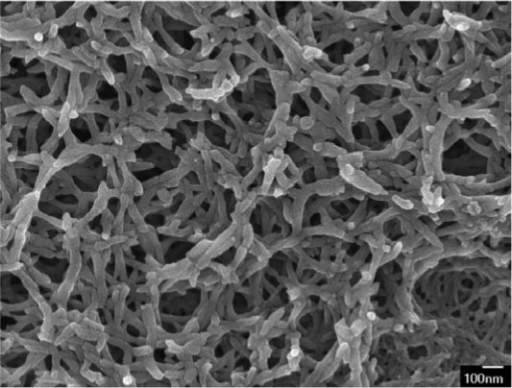
Scanning electron microscope (SEM) image of polyaniline nanofiber film.

Polyaniline nanofibers are a high aspect form of polyaniline, a polymer consisting of aniline monomers, which appears as discrete long threads with an average diameter between 30 nm and 100 nm. Polyaniline is one of the oldest known conducting polymers, being known for over 150 years. Polyaniline nanofibers are often studied for their potential to enhance the properties of polyaniline or have additional beneficial properties due to the addition of a nanostructure to the polymer. Properties that make polyaniline useful can be seen in the nanofiber form as well, such as facile synthesis, environmental stability, and simple acid/base doping/dedoping chemistry. These and other properties have led to the formation of various applications for polyaniline nanofibers as actuators, memory devices, and sensors.

== Synthesis ==
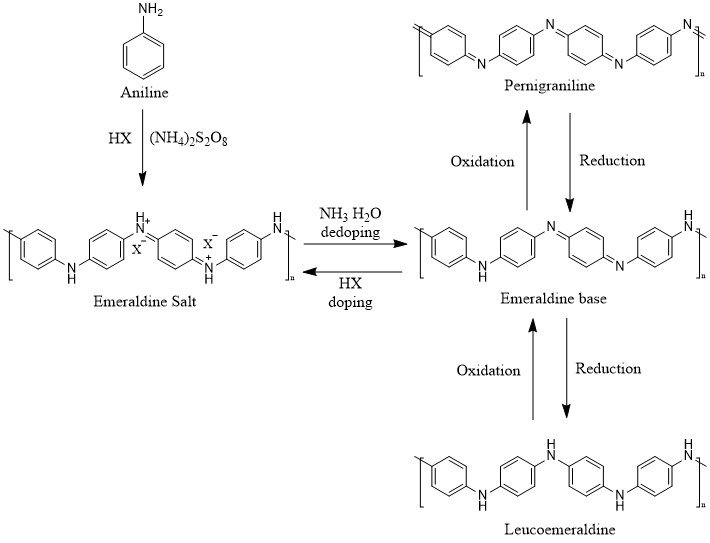
Polymerization pathways of polyaniline and polyaniline nanofibers, as well as the doped/dedoped oxidation/reduction chemistry that can occur.

Methods for the polymerization of polyaniline nanofibers seen in literature primarily include [redox|chemical oxidative] polymerization, interfacial synthesis, and "rapid mixing" methods. Other less common methods include nanofiber seeding, electrosynthesis, electrospinning, and preforming polymerization in dilute aniline solutions.

=== Chemical oxidative polymerization ===
Chemical oxidative polymerization is a traditional and commonly used method for the polymerization of aniline in large quantities. When aniline is mixed with an oxidant in an acidic solution, polymerization will occur. The most important parameter to be controlled in this method for the synthesis of polyaniline nanofibers is the domination of homogeneous nucleation over heterogeneous nucleation. Homogeneous nucleation describes when the nuclei are formed spontaneously in solution while heterogeneous nucleation describes when the nuclei are grown on other species. In the early stages of this polymerization, only nanofibers are formed since there are no heteronuclei available for heterogeneous nucleation. However, if the reaction is left uncontrolled, heterogeneous nucleation will begin to dominate as the polyaniline will preferentially grow on existing particles, leading to irreversible agglomeration. The reaction can be made to favor homogeneous nucleation throughout by increasing reaction speed, temperature of the reaction, and allowing the reaction to proceed without stirring.

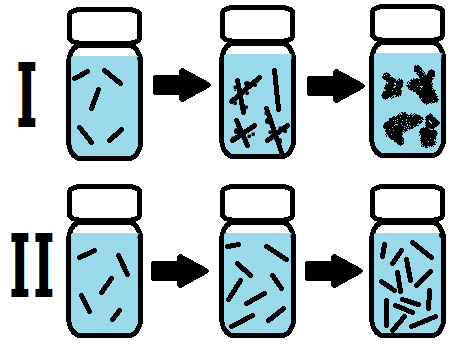
Route I shows the heterogeneous nucleation route, where the nanofibers are formed, followed by secondary growth on the wires which cause agglomeration. Route II shows the homogeneous nucleation route, where only nanofibers are formed.

The diameter of the polyaniline nanofibers can be controlled with this method through choice of acid. Hydrochloric acid produces nanofibers with a diameter of about 30 nm, while camphorsulfonic acid and perchloric acid produce a diameter of 50 nm and 120 nm respectively. Under normal synthetic methods polyaniline derivatives, such as ones that are alkyl and fluoro substituted, do not exhibit a well-defined fibrous shape, however, in the presence of an aniline oligomer nanofibers of certain derivatives can be synthesized. While the most common oxidant is ammonium peroxydisulfate (APS), various others can be used. One study shows the use of potassium biiodate (KH(IO_{3})_{2}) as an oxidant, claiming it to lead to polyaniline nanofibers that are longer, have higher crystallinity, and have higher electrical conductivity.

=== Interfacial synthesis ===
In interfacial synthesis, the polymerization happens at the interface between an aqueous and an organic layer. A typical reaction involves an aqueous solution of acid and oxidant and an organic layer of aniline together. This creates the reactive interface for polymerization to occur. As polymerization proceeds, the polyaniline nanofibers will diffuse into the water layer, leaving the reactive interface. This prevents overgrowth onto the existing wires, allowing for homogeneous nucleation to continue occurring. Conditions in the interfacial synthesis can be tuned, such as the type of acid used as well as the oxidant used.

=== Rapid mixing reactions ===
Polyaniline nanofibers can also be synthesized through "rapid mixing" reactions. This method attempts to prevent overgrowth that would compromise the nanofiber nature of the polymer by stopping the polymerization immediately after nanofibers have been formed. This is achieved by the rapid mixing of the monomer, aniline, and an initiator solution. At the start of the reaction, the initiator is consumed rapidly and completely depleted when the nanofibers are formed. Without initiator remaining, the synthesis of polyaniline is halted.

== Applications ==
=== Monolithic actuators ===
Polyaniline nanofibers have been used in the creation of monolithic actuators. They can be used in this application due to their ability to be flash-welded. When exposed to light, polyaniline converts the absorbed energy directly into heat. In a polyaniline film, the heat is dispersed throughout the polymer. In polyaniline nanofibers, however, the heat is trapped within the individual fibers. Therefore, if the intensity of the light is great enough, it will cause the temperature of the nanofibers to rise rapidly, which causes them to weld together or burn. With a moderate flash intensity, the nanofibers will melt rapidly to form a smooth film. Using mask, welds in specific patterns can be made using this technique. In a thick enough sample of nanofibers, only the side exposed to the flash will be welded, creating an asymmetric film where one side remains intact as nanofibers while the other side is effectively crosslinked due to welding. These asymmetric films demonstrate rapid reversible actuation in the presence of acids and bases, in the form of bending and curling. The advantages polyaniline nanofiber asymmetric films have over other actuators include the ease of synthesis, large degree of bending, patternability, and no delamination. These actuators could be used in the development of microtweezers, microvalves, artificial muscles, chemical sensors, and patterned actuator structures.

=== Digital memory devices ===
Research has shown that polyaniline nanofibers can also be used to create nonvolatile plastic digital memory devices when decorated with various metal, such as gold, nanoparticles. Gold nanoparticles are grown inside dedoped polyaniline nanofibers using a redox reaction. A plastic composite film is placed between two electrodes, and an external bias is used to program ON-OFF states. The switching mechanism is thought to be caused through an interaction between the polyaniline nanofibers and the gold nanoparticles, where charge is transferred to the gold nanoparticles from the polyaniline nanofibers due to an induced electric field. Switching between the ON–OFF states has shown to be rapid, with times of less than 25ns. The retention time of these simple devices are on the order of days after programming, and write–read–erase cycles have been demonstrated.

=== Chemical sensing applications ===
Polyaniline nanofibers have been shown to be incredibly successful as chemical sensors, as they perform better than conventional polyaniline films in numerous tests. This performance difference has been attributed to their high surface area, porosity, and small diameters which enhance diffusion of materials through the nanofibers. Polyaniline nanofiber sensors function through a change in resistance. The polyaniline nanofiber film is placed on an electrode, where a current flows through. The resistance of the electrode changes when the target interacts with the film, which allows the target to be detected.

One study proposes the creation of hydrogen gas sensors using polyaniline nanofibers. It shows that both doped and dedoped polyaniline nanofibers can be used for detection of hydrogen gas through resistance changes, but the dedoped nanofibers were more stable and had better reproducibility.

Another study shows the potential of polyaniline nanofibers as NO_{2} gas sensors. NO_{2} gas acts as a strong oxidizing agent to the emeraldine form of polyaniline nanofibers, which causes resistance changes greater than three orders of magnitude at 100 ppm.

Sensing targets can be expanded through adding materials to the polyaniline nanofibers. One study proposes polyaniline nanofiber composites with metal salts for the detection of hydrogen sulfide. Hydrogen sulfide is a weak acid that is dangerous at low ppm, but polyaniline nanofibers can only give a robust response to strong acids. Metal salts can react with hydrogen sulfate to form a metal sulfide precipitate and a strong acid. By combining metal salts and polyaniline nanofibers, detection of hydrogen sulfide can be performed.

Another study decorated polyaniline nanofibers with gold nanoparticles to detect volatile sulfur compounds in expired human breath. These sensors can potentially be used in various breath analyses and also in disease diagnosis for diseases with malodor biomarker gases.

Humidity sensors have also been prepared using polyaniline nanofibers. These sensors were prepared through electrospinning of a N,N-dimethylformamide solution of polyaniline nanofibers, poly(vinyl butyral) (PVB), and poly(ethylene oxide) (PEO). These sensors were shown to have high sensitivity, with resistance changes of three orders of magnitude. Furthermore, the sensors showed good sensing linearity, fast response, small hysterics, and good repeatability.

== See also ==
- Polyaniline
- Nanofiber
