= Polyphenylene sulfide =

Organic polymer with industrial applications

Polyphenylene sulfide

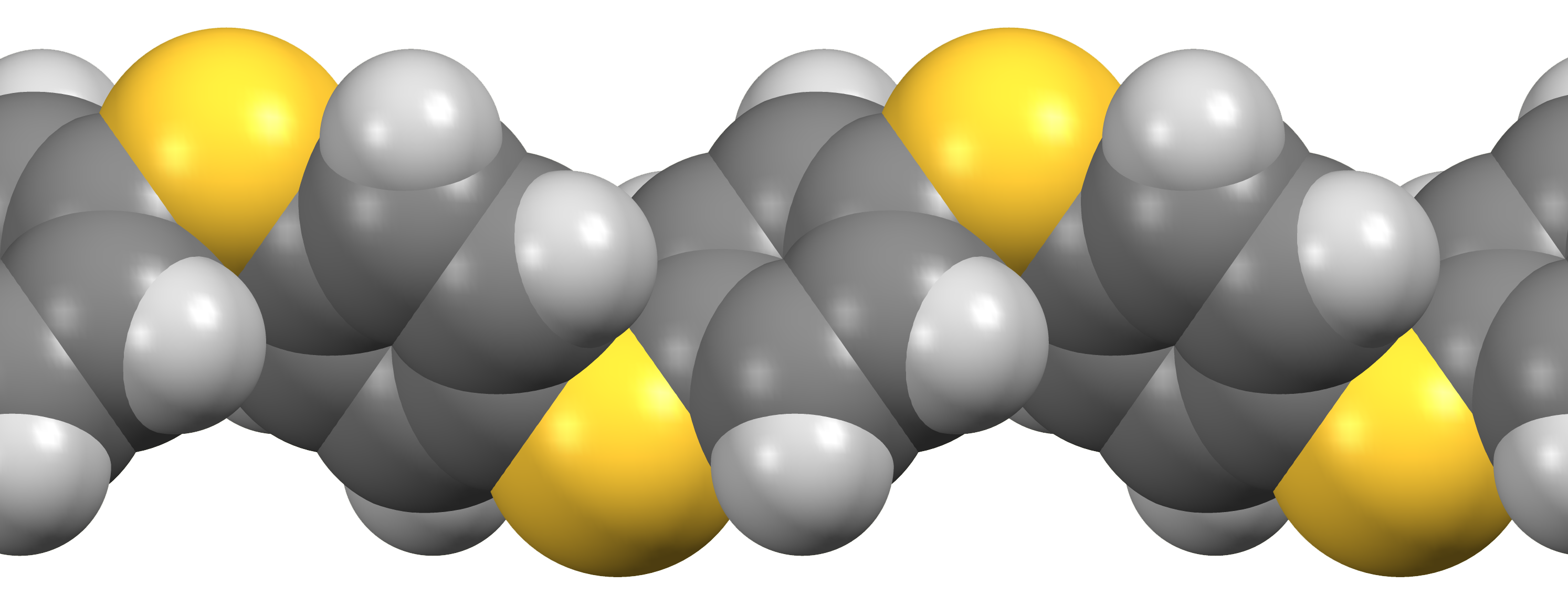
Space-filling model of a short section of a polyphenylene sulfide chain from the crystal structure

Polyphenylene sulfide (PPS) is an organic polymer consisting of aromatic rings linked by sulfides. Synthetic fiber and textiles derived from this polymer resist chemical and thermal attack. PPS is used in filter fabric for coal boilers, papermaking felts, electrical insulation, film capacitors, specialty membranes, gaskets, musical instrument components and packings. PPS is the precursor to a conductive polymer of the semi-flexible rod polymer family. The PPS, which is otherwise insulating, can be converted to the semiconducting form by oxidation or use of dopants.

Polyphenylene sulfide is an engineering plastic, commonly used today as a high-performance thermoplastic. PPS can be molded, extruded, or machined to tight tolerances. In its pure solid form, it may be opaque white to light tan in color. Maximum service temperature is 240 °C (464 °F). PPS has been found to not dissolve in any solvent at temperatures below approximately 200 °C (392 °F).

== Manufacturers and trade names ==
PPS is marketed by different brand names by different manufacturers. The major industry players are China Lumena New Materials, Solvay, Kureha, HDC Polyall, Celanese, DIC Corporation, Toray Industries, Zhejiang NHU Special Materials, SABIC, and Tosoh. Other manufacturers include Chengdu Letian Plastics, Lion Idemitsu Composites, and Initz (a joint venture of SK Chemicals and Teijin).

The following are examples of brand names by manufacturer and PPS type:

- Tedur, Albis Plastic, linear type
- DIC.PPS, DIC Corporation, linear and cross-linked
- DURAFIDE, Polyplastics Co. Ltd, linear type
- ECOTRAN, HDC Polyall, distributed and compounded via A. Schulman
- Fortron, Ticona, linear type
- Petcoal, Tōsō
- Therma-Tech TT9200-5001, PolyOne Corporation
- Ryton, Solvay Specialty Polymers, linear and cross-linked
- Torelina Toray
- NHU-PPS, Zhejiang NHU Company Ltd., linear type and cross-linked

== Characteristics ==
PPS is one of the most important high temperature thermoplastic polymers because it exhibits a number of desirable properties. These properties include resistance to heat, acids, alkalies, mildew, bleaches, aging, sunlight, and abrasion. It absorbs only small amounts of solvents and resists dyeing.

== Production ==
The Federal Trade Commission definition for sulfur fiber is "A manufactured fiber in which the fiber-forming substance is a long chain synthetic polysulfide in which at least 85% of the sulfide (–S–) linkages are attached directly to two (2) aromatic rings." The generic name for this synthetic fiber is Sulfar.

The PPS (polyphenylene sulfide) polymer is formed by reaction of sodium sulfide with 1,4-dichlorobenzene:

n ClC_{6}H_{4}Cl + n Na_{2}S → [C_{6}H_{4}S]_{n} + 2n NaCl

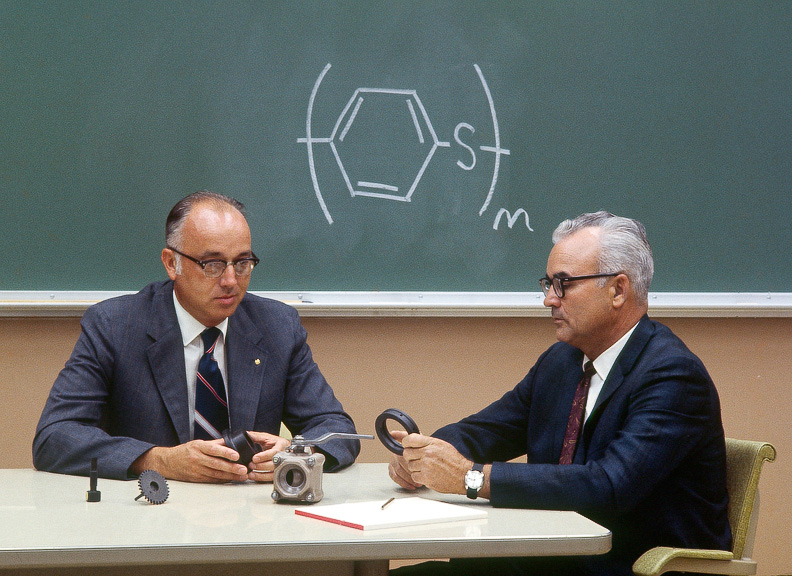
Hill and Edmonds, developers of PPS

The process for commercially producing this material was initially developed by H. Wayne Hill Jr. and James T. Edmonds Jr. at Phillips Petroleum. N-Methyl-2-pyrrolidone (NMP) is used as the reaction solvent because it is stable at the high temperatures required for the synthesis and it dissolves both the sulfiding agent and the oligomeric intermediates.

Linear, high-molecular-weight PPS that is capable of being extruded into film or melt spun into fiber was invented by Robert W. Campbell.

The first U.S. commercial sulfur fiber was produced in 1983 by Phillips Fibers Corporation, a subsidiary of Phillips 66.
