= Interfacial polymerization =

Type of polymerization occurring at the interface of two immiscible phases

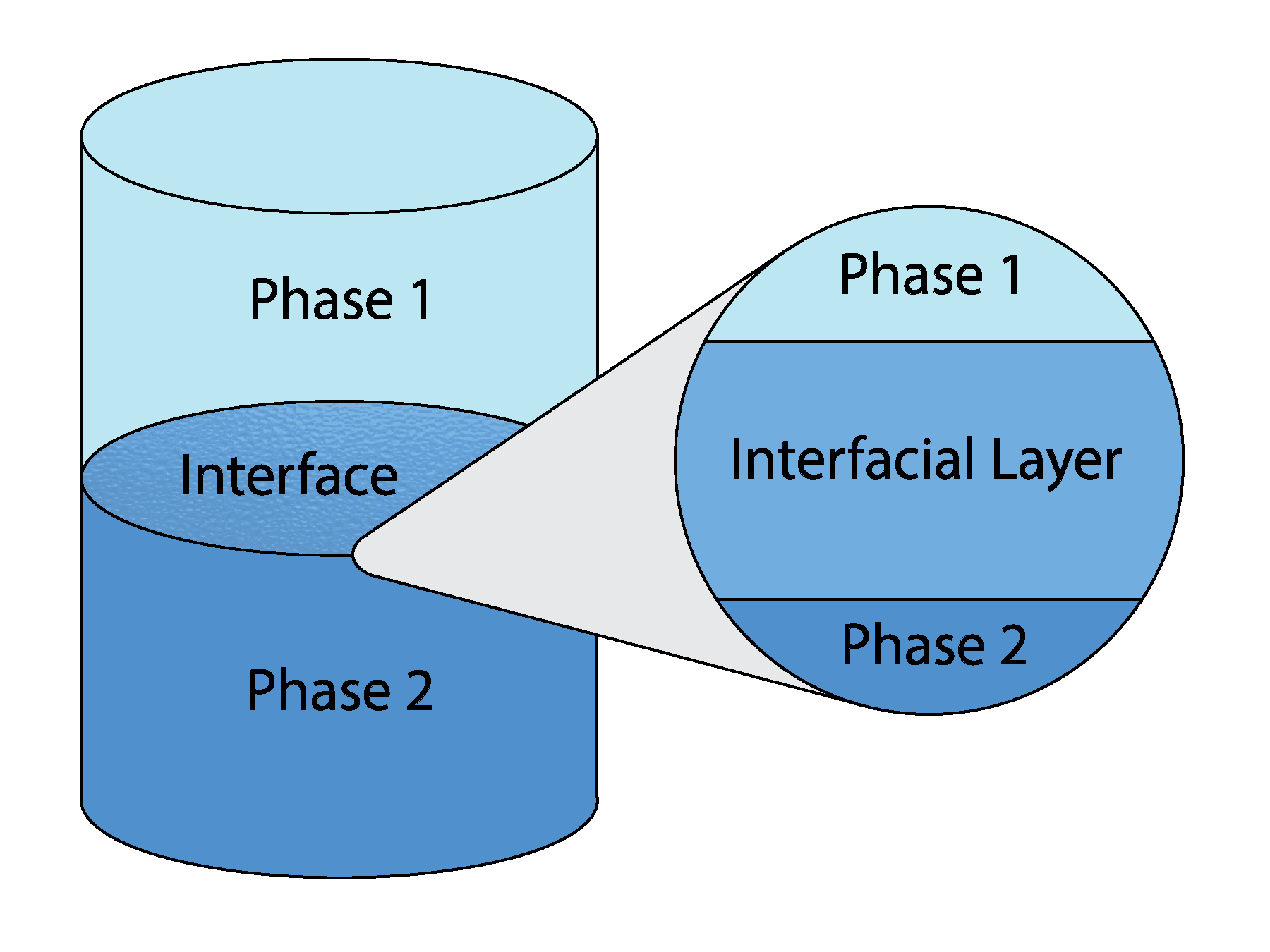
A typically experimental setup for interfacial polymerization. One phase is above the interface, and the other phase is below. Polymerization occurs where the two phases meet, at the interface.

Interfacial polymerization is a type of step-growth polymerization in which polymerization occurs at the interface between two immiscible phases (generally two liquids), resulting in a polymer that is constrained to the interface. There are several variations of interfacial polymerization, which result in several types of polymer topologies, such as ultra-thin films, nanocapsules, and nanofibers.

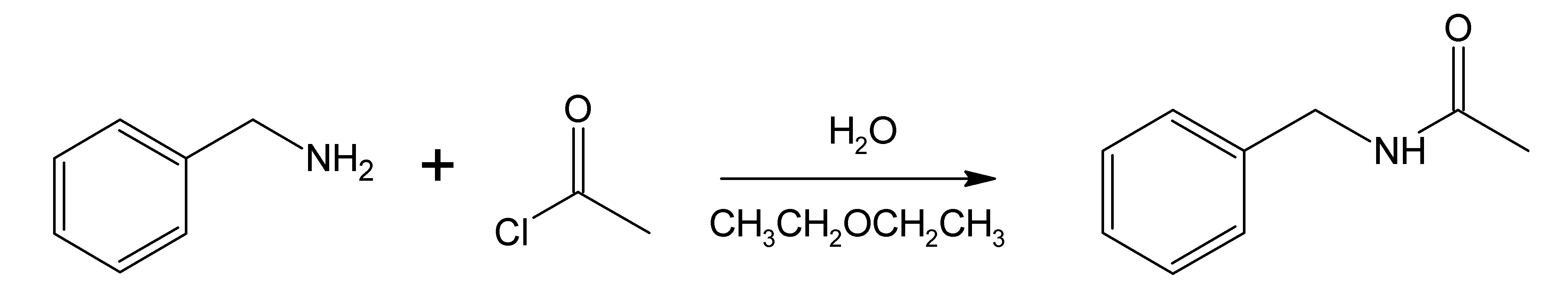
An example of a Schotten-Baumann reaction. Benzylamine reacts with acetyl chloride under Schotten-Baumann conditions to form N-benzylacetamide.

== History ==
Interfacial polymerization (then termed "interfacial polycondensation") was first discovered by Emerson L. Wittbecker and Paul W. Morgan in 1959 as an alternative to the typically high-temperature and low-pressure melt polymerization technique. As opposed to melt polymerization, interfacial polymerization reactions can be accomplished using standard laboratory equipment and under atmospheric conditions.

This first interfacial polymerization was accomplished using the Schotten–Baumann reaction, a method to synthesize amides from amines and acid chlorides. In this case, a polyamide, usually synthesized via melt polymerization, was synthesized from diamine and diacid chloride monomers. The diacid chloride monomers were placed in an organic solvent (benzene) and the diamene monomers in a water phase, such that when the monomers reached the interface they would polymerize.

Since 1959, interfacial polymerization has been extensively researched and used to prepare not only polyamides but also polyanilines, polyimides, polyurethanes, polyureas, polypyrroles, polyesters, polysulfonamides, polyphenyl esters and polycarbonates. In recent years, polymers synthesized by interfacial polymerization have been used in applications where a particular topological or physical property is desired, such as conducting polymers for electronics, water purification membranes, and cargo-loading microcapsules.

== Mechanism ==
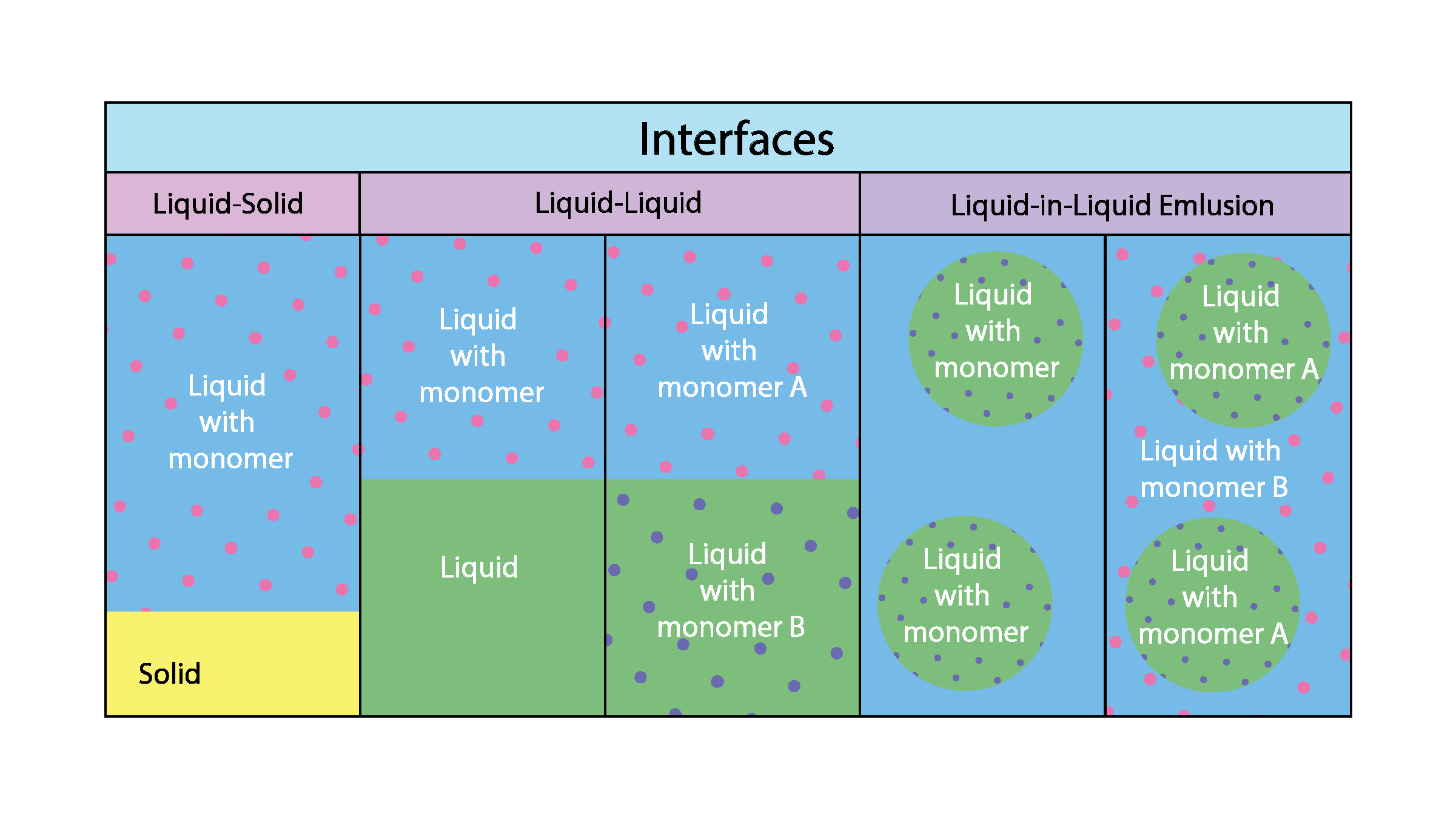
Five common types of interfacial polymerization interfaces (from left to right): liquid-solid, liquid-liquid, and liquid-in-liquid emulsion. There are two examples each for liquid-liquid and liquid-in-liquid emulsion, either using one monomer or two.

The most commonly used interfacial polymerization methods fall into 3 broad types of interfaces: liquid-solid interfaces, liquid-liquid interfaces, and liquid-in-liquid emulsion interfaces. In the liquid-liquid and liquid-in-liquid emulsion interfaces, either one or both liquid phases may contain monomers. There are also other interface categories, rarely used, including liquid-gas, solid-gas, and solid-solid.

In a liquid-solid interface, polymerization begins at the interface, and results in a polymer attached to the surface of the solid phase. In a liquid-liquid interface with monomer dissolved in one phase, polymerization occurs on only one side of the interface, whereas in liquid-liquid interfaces with monomer dissolved in both phases, polymerization occurs on both sides. An interfacial polymerization reaction may proceed either stirred or unstirred. In a stirred reaction, the two phases are combined using vigorous agitation, resulting in a higher interfacial surface area and a higher polymer yield. In the case of capsule synthesis, the size of the capsule is directly determined by the stirring rate of the emulsion.

Although interfacial polymerization appears to be a relatively straightforward process, there are several experimental variables that can be modified in order to design specific polymers or modify polymer characteristics. Some of the more notable variables include the identity of the organic solvent, monomer concentration, reactivity, solubility, the stability of the interface, and the number of functional groups present on the monomers. The identity of the organic solvent is of utmost importance, as it affects several other factors such as monomer diffusion, reaction rate, and polymer solubility and permeability. The number of functional groups present on the monomer is also important, as it affects the polymer topology: a di-substituted monomer will form linear chains whereas a tri- or tetra-substituted monomer forms branched polymers.

Most interfacial polymerizations are synthesized on a porous support in order to provide additional mechanical strength, allowing delicate nano films to be used in industrial applications. In this case, a good support would consist of pores ranging from 1 to 100 nm. Free-standing films, by contrast, do not use a support, and are often used to synthesize unique topologies such as micro- or nanocapsules. In the case of polyurethanes and polyamides especially, the film can be pulled continuously from the interface in an unstirred reaction, forming "ropes" of polymeric film. As the polymer precipitates, it can be withdrawn continuously.

It is interesting to note that the molecular weight distribution of polymers synthesized by interfacial polymerization is broader than the Flory–Schulz distribution due to the high concentration of monomers near the interfacial site. Because the two solutions used in this reaction are immiscible and the rate of reaction is high, this reaction mechanism tends to produce a small number of long polymer chains of high molecular weight.

== Mathematical Models ==
Interfacial polymerization has proven difficult to model accurately due to its nature as a nonequilibrium process. These models provide either analytical or numerical solutions. The wide range of variables involved in interfacial polymerization has led to several different approaches and several different models. One of the more general models of interfacial polymerization, summarized by Berezkin and co-workers, involves treating interfacial polymerization as a heterogenous mass transfer combined with a second-order chemical reaction. In order to take into account different variables, this interfacial polymerization model is divided into three scales, yielding three different models: the kinetic model, the local model, and the macrokinetic model.

The kinetic model is based on the principles of kinetics, assumes uniform chemical distribution, and describes the system at a molecular level. This model takes into account thermodynamic qualities such as mechanisms, activation energies, rate constants, and equilibrium constants. The kinetic model is typically incorporated into either the local or the macrokinetic model in order to provide greater accuracy.

The local model is used to determine the characteristics of polymerization at a section around the interface, termed the diffusion boundary layer. This model can be used to describe a system in which the monomer distribution and concentration are inhomogeneous, and is restricted to a small volume. Parameters determined using the local model include the mass transfer weight, the degree of polymerization, topology near the interface, and the molecular weight distribution of the polymer. Using local modeling, the dependence of monomer mass transfer characteristics and polymer characteristics as a function of kinetic, diffusion, and concentration factors can be analyzed. One approach to calculating a local model can be represented by the following differential equation:

${\partial c_i\over\partial t} = {\partial\over\partial y}(D_i{\partial c_i\over\partial y}) + J_i$

in which c_{i} is the molar concentration of functional groups in the ith component of a monomer or polymer, t is the elapsed time, y is a coordinate normal to the surface/interface, D_{i} is the molecular diffusion coefficient of the functional groups of interest, and J_{i} is the thermodynamic rate of reaction. Although precise, no analytical solution exists for this differential equation, and as such solutions must be found using approximate or numerical techniques.

In the macrokinetic model, the progression of an entire system is predicted. One important assumption of the macrokinetic model is that each mass transfer process is independent, and can therefore be described by a local model. The macrokinetic model may be the most important, as it can provide feedback on the efficiency of the reaction process, important in both laboratory and industrial applications.

More specific approaches to modeling interfacial polymerization are described by Ji and co-workers, and include modeling of thin-film composite (TFC) membranes, tubular fibers, hollow membranes, and capsules. These models take into account both reaction- and diffusion-controlled interfacial polymerization under non-steady-state conditions. One model is for thin film composite (TFC) membranes, and describes the thickness of the composite film as a function of time:

$t = -({E_0 \over B_0} + {A_0D_0 \over B_0^2} + {C_0A_0^2 \over B_0^2}) \ln(1-{X \over X_{max}})-{C_0 \over 2B_0}X^2 - ({D_0 \over B_0}+{C_0A_0 \over B_0^2})X$

Where A_{0}, B_{0}, C_{0}, D_{0}, and E_{0} are constants determined by the system, X is the film thickness, and X_{max} is the maximum value of film thickness, which can be determined experimentally.

Another model for interfacial polymerization of capsules, or encapsulation, is also described:

$t = A_0{R_{min}}^5E_0I_4 + B_0{R_{min}}^4E_0I_3 + C_0{R_{min}}^2E_0I_2 + D_0{R_{min}}E_0I_1$

Where A_{0}, B_{0}, C_{0}, D_{0}, E_{0}_{,} I_{1}, I_{2}, I_{3}, and I_{4} are constants determined by the system and R_{min} is the minimum value of the inside diameter of the polymeric capsule wall.

There are several assumptions made by these and similar models, including but not limited to uniformity of monomer concentration, temperature, and film density, and second-order reaction kinetics.

== Applications ==
Interfacial polymerization has found much use in industrial applications, especially as a route to synthesize conducting polymers for electronics. Conductive polymers synthesized by interfacial polymerization such as polyaniline (PANI), Polypyrrole (PPy), poly(3,4-ethylenedioxythiophene), and polythiophene (PTh) have found applications as chemical sensors, fuel cells, supercapacitors, and nanoswitches.

=== Sensors ===
PANI nanofibers are the most commonly used for sensing applications. These nanofibers have been shown to detect various gaseous chemicals, such as hydrogen chloride (HCl), ammonia (NH_{3}), Hydrazine (N_{2}H_{4}), chloroform (CHCl_{3}), and methanol (CH_{3}OH). PANI nanofibers can be further fined-tuned by doping and modifying the polymer chain conformation, among other methods, to increase selectivity to certain gases. A typical PANI chemical sensor consists of a substrate, an electrode, and a selective polymer layer. PANI nanofibers, like other chemiresistors, detect by a change in electrical resistance/conductivity in response to the chemical environment.

=== Fuel Cells ===
PPy-coated ordered mesoporouscarbon (OMC) composites can be used in direct methanol fuel cell applications. The polymerization of PPy onto the OMC reduces interfacial electrical resistances without altering the open mesopore structure, making PPy-coated OMC composites a more ideal material for fuel cells than plain OMCs.

=== Separation/Purification Membranes ===
Composite polymer films synthesized via a liquid-solid interface are the most commonly used to synthesize membranes for reverse osmosis and other applications. One added benefits of using polymers prepared by interfacial polymerization is that several properties, such as pore size and interconnectivity, can be fined-tuned to create a more ideal product for specific applications. For example, synthesizing a polymer with a pore size somewhere between the molecular size of hydrogen gas (H_{2}) and carbon dioxide (CO_{2}) results in a membrane selectively-permeable to H_{2}, but not to CO_{2}, effectively separating the compounds.

=== Cargo-loading Micro- and Nanocapsules ===
Compared to previous methods of capsule synthesis, interfacial polymerization is an easily modified synthesis that results in capsules with a wide range of properties and functionalities. Once synthesized, the capsules can enclose drugs, quantum dots, and other nanoparticles, to list a few examples. Further fine-tuning of the chemical and topological properties of these polymer capsules could prove an effective route to create drug-delivery systems.

== See also ==
- Polymerization
- Interfacial polycondensation
