= Nanofiber seeding =

Chemical process

Nanofiber Seeding is a process to control the bulk morphology of chemically synthesized conducting polymers. Typically, catalytic amount of nanofiber seeds are added in prior to onset of nanofiber seeding polymerization (reaction), where seeds are served as the 'morphology directing agent' rather than conventional templates (see hard or soft templating methods).

== Description ==
A new synthetic approach, called nanofiber seeding,^{1} was developed to control the bulk morphology of chemically synthesized electronic organic polymers. Bulk quantities of nanofibers of conducting polymers such as polyaniline, can be synthesized in one step without the need for conventional templates, surfactants, polymers, or organic solvents.^{3}

Conventional oxidative polymerization approaches to nanostructured conducting polymers include the use of hard template zeolites, opals, and controlled pore-size membranes, or soft template such as polymers and surfactants. A “template-free” approach has also been described in which the use of large organic anions results in polyaniline nanofibers and nanotubes having average diameters in the 650-80 nm range.^{1}

Standard synthesis of polyaniline yields granular morphology. However, if the conventional reaction is seeded by 1-4 mg (seed quantities) of added pre-synthesized polyaniline nanofibers, (nanofiber seeds could be prepared from interfacial polymerization) the bulk morphology changes dramatically from granular to nano-fibrillar. Furthermore, increased capacitance values were observed in polyaniline nanofibers synthesized by the nanofiber seeding approach. Oxidative polymerization can be also seeded by other nanostructure materials such as vanadium pentoxide nanofibers, where V_{2}O_{5} nanofibers (i) Rapidly initiate fibrillar polymer growth (ii) Slowly dissolve in aq. 1.0 M HCl, which eliminates template removal steps. Hence only catalytic amounts (4 mg) V_{2}O_{5} nanofibers are needed prior to onset of polymerization, which significantly change the bulk morphology of the polymer precipitate. Moreover, single-walled carbon nanotube and nano fibrous hexapeptide can be also used as templating seeds. This method can be extended to all major classes of conducting polymers, including polypyrrole, PEDOT and other polythiophenes etc.^{2}^{3}

Nanofiber seeding is a convenient approach to obtain thin, substrate-supported, transparent films of nanofibers of conducting polymers without requiring any bulk processing steps. ^{3}
