= Semi-flexible rod polymer =

Organic polymer

Semi-flexible rod polymers are a kind of organic polymer which may be converted to conductive polymers by appropriate oxidations or doping.

Examples include polyaniline, poly(p-phenylene oxide) and poly(p-phenylene sulfide).
