= Nanofiber =

Natural or synthetic fibers with diameters in the nanometer range

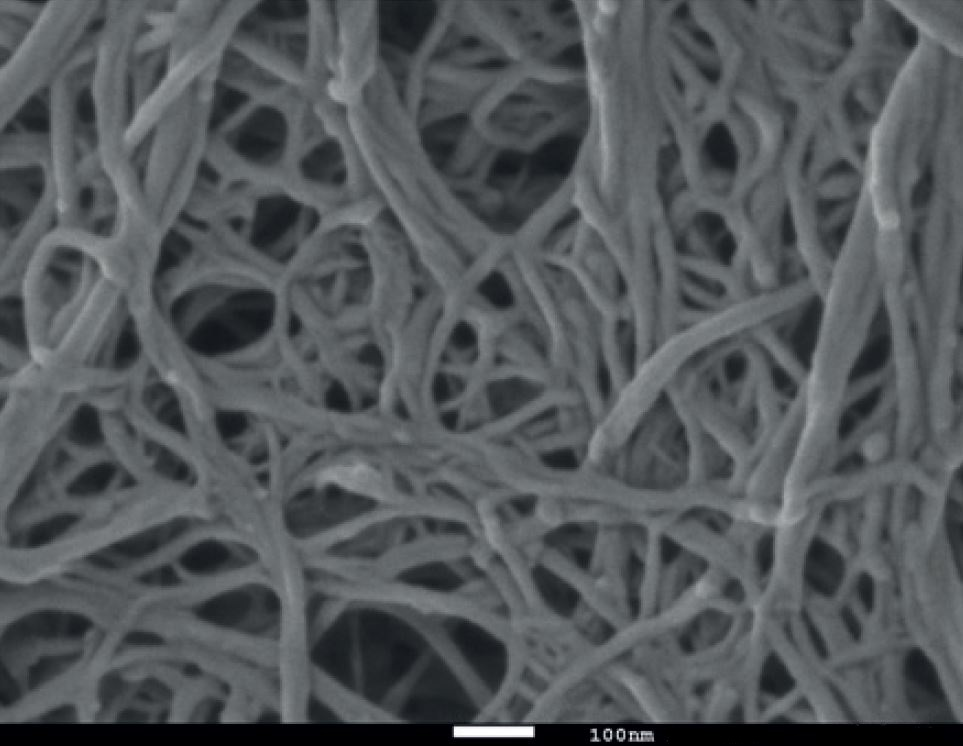
Example of a cellulose nanofiber network.

Nanofibers are fibers with diameters in the nanometer range (typically, between 1 nm and 1 μm). Nanofibers can be generated from different polymers and hence have different physical properties and application potentials. Examples of natural polymers include collagen, cellulose, silk fibroin, keratin, gelatin and polysaccharides such as chitosan and alginate. Examples of synthetic polymers include poly(lactic acid) (PLA), polycaprolactone (PCL), polyurethane (PU), poly(lactic-co-glycolic acid) (PLGA), poly(3-hydroxybutyrate-co-3-hydroxyvalerate) (PHBV), and poly(ethylene-co-vinylacetate) (PEVA). Polymer chains are connected via covalent bonds. The diameters of nanofibers depend on the type of polymer used and the method of production. All polymer nanofibers are unique for their large surface area-to-volume ratio, high porosity, appreciable mechanical strength, and flexibility in functionalization compared to their microfiber counterparts.

There exist many different methods to make nanofibers, including drawing, electrospinning, self-assembly, template synthesis, and thermal-induced phase separation. Electrospinning is the most commonly used method to generate nanofibers because of the straightforward setup, the ability to mass-produce continuous nanofibers from various polymers, and the capability to generate ultrathin fibers with controllable diameters, compositions, and orientations. This flexibility allows for controlling the shape and arrangement of the fibers so that different structures (i.e. hollow, flat and ribbon shaped) can be fabricated depending on intended application purposes.

Nanofibers have many possible technological and commercial applications. They are used in tissue engineering, drug delivery, seed coating material, cancer diagnosis, lithium-air battery, optical sensors, air filtration, redox-flow batteries and composite materials.

== History of nanofiber production ==
Nanofibers were first produced via electrospinning more than four centuries ago. Beginning with the development of the electrospinning method, English physicist William Gilbert (1544-1603) first documented the electrostatic attraction between liquids by preparing an experiment in which he observed a spherical water drop on a dry surface warp into a cone shape when it was held below an electrically charged amber. This deformation later came to be known as the Taylor cone. In 1882, English physicist Lord Rayleigh (1842-1919) analyzed the unstable states of liquid droplets that were electrically charged, and noted that the liquid was ejected in tiny jets when equilibrium was established between the surface tension and electrostatic force. In 1887, British physicist Charles Vernon Boys (1855-1944) published a manuscript about nanofiber development and production. In 1900, American inventor John Francis Cooley (1861-1903) filed the first modern electrospinning patent.

Anton Formhals was the first person to attempt nanofiber production between 1934 and 1944 and publish the first patent describing the experimental production of nanofibers. In 1966, Harold Simons published a patent for a device that could produce thin and light nanofiber fabrics with diverse motifs.

Only at the end of the 20th century have the words electrospinning and nanofiber become common language among scientists and researchers. Electrospinning continues to be developed today.

== Synthesis methods ==
Many chemical and mechanical techniques for preparing nanofibers exist.

=== Electrospinning ===
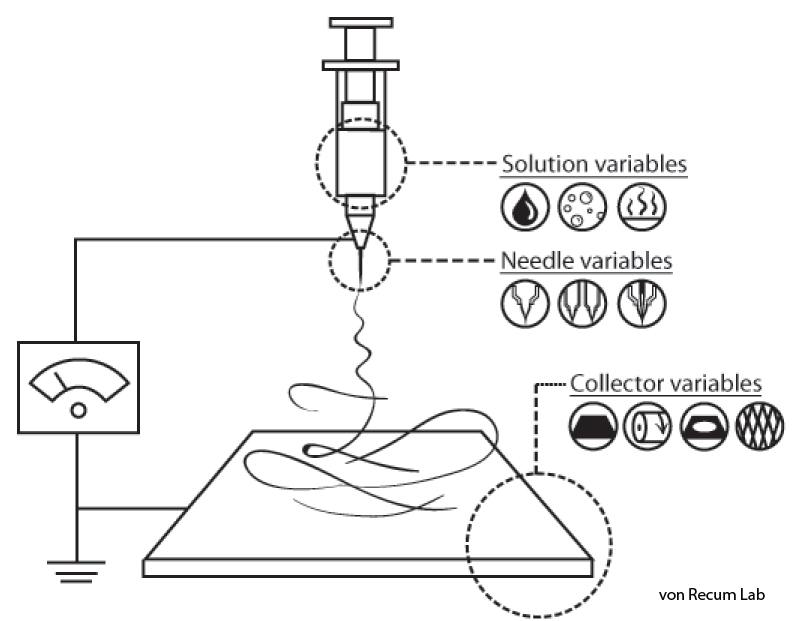
Diagram of a general set-up of electrospinning.

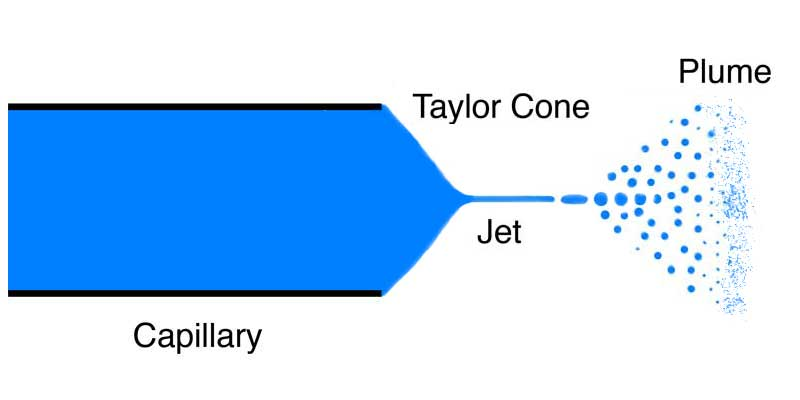
Taylor cone from which jet of polymer solution is ejected.

Electrospinning is the most commonly used method to fabricate nanofibers. The instruments necessary for electrospinning include a high voltage supplier, a capillary tube with a pipette or needle with a small diameter, and a metal collecting screen. One electrode is placed into the polymer solution and the other electrode is attached to the collector. An electric field is applied to the end of the capillary tube that contains the polymer solution held by its surface tension and forms a charge on the surface of the liquid. As the intensity of the electric field increases, the hemispherical surface of the fluid at the tip of the capillary tube elongates to form a conical shape known as the Taylor cone. A critical value is attained upon further increase in the electric field in which the repulsive electrostatic force overcomes the surface tension and the charged jet of fluid is ejected from the tip of the Taylor cone. The discharged polymer solution jet is unstable and elongates as a result, allowing the jet to become very long and thin. Charged polymer fibers solidifies with solvent evaporation. Randomly-oriented nanofibers are collected on the collector. Nanofibers can also be collected in a highly aligned fashion by using specialized collectors such as the rotating drum, metal frame, or a two-parallel plates system. Parameters such as jet stream movement and polymer concentration have to be controlled to produce nanofibers with uniform diameters and morphologies.

The electrospinning technique transforms many types of polymers into nanofibers. An electrospun nanofiber network resembles the extracellular matrix (ECM) well. This resemblance is a major advantage of electrospinning because it opens up the possibility of mimicking the ECM with regards to fiber diameters, high porosity, and mechanical properties. Electrospinning is being further developed for mass production of one-by-one continuous nanofibers.

=== Thermal-induced phase separation ===
Thermal-induced phase separation separates a homogenous polymer solution into a multi-phase system via thermodynamic changes. The procedure involves five steps: polymer dissolution, liquid-liquid or liquid-solid phase separation, polymer gelation, extraction of solvent from the gel with water, and freezing and freeze-drying under vacuum. Thermal-induced phase separation method is widely used to generate scaffolds for tissue regeneration.

The homogenous polymer solution in the first step is thermodynamically unstable and tends to separate into polymer-rich and polymer-lean phases under appropriate temperature. Eventually after solvent removal, the polymer-rich phase solidifies to form the matrix and the polymer-lean phase develops into pores. Next, two types of phase separation can be carried out on the polymer solution depending on the desired pattern. Liquid-liquid separation is usually used to form bicontinuous phase structures while solid-liquid phase separation is used to form crystal structures. The gelation step plays a crucial role in controlling the porous morphology of the nanofibrous matrices. Gelation is influenced by temperature, polymer concentration, and solvent properties. Temperature regulates the structure of the fiber network: low gelation temperature results in formation of nanoscale fiber networks while high gelation temperature leads to the formation of a platelet-like structure. Polymer concentration affects fiber properties: an increase in polymer concentration decreases porosity and increases mechanical properties such as tensile strength. Solvent properties influence morphology of the scaffolds. After gelation, gel is placed in distilled water for solvent exchange. Afterwards, the gel is removed from the water and goes through freezing and freeze-drying. It is then stored in a desiccator until characterization.

=== Drawing ===
The drawing method makes long single strands of nanofibers one at a time. The pulling process is accompanied by solidification that converts the dissolved spinning material into a solid fiber. A cooling step is necessary in the case of melt spinning and evaporation of solvent in the case of dry spinning. A limitation, however, is that only a viscoelastic material that can undergo extensive deformations while possessing sufficient cohesion to survive the stresses developed during pulling can be made into nanofibers through this process.

=== Template synthesis ===
The template synthesis method uses a nanoporous membrane template composed of cylindrical pores of uniform diameter to make fibrils (solid nanofiber) and tubules (hollow nanofiber). This method can be used to prepare fibrils and tubules of many types of materials, including metals, semiconductors and electronically conductive polymers. The uniform pores allow for control of the dimensions of the fibers so nanofibers with very small diameters can be produced through this method. However, a drawback of this method is that it cannot make continuous nanofibers one at a time.

=== Self-assembly ===
The self-assembly technique is used to generate peptide nanofibers and peptide amphiphiles. The method was inspired by the natural folding process of amino acid residues to form proteins with unique three-dimensional structures. The self-assembly process of peptide nanofibers involves various driving forces such as hydrophobic interactions, electrostatic forces, hydrogen bonding and van der Waals forces and is influenced by external conditions such as ionic strength and pH.

== Polymer materials ==
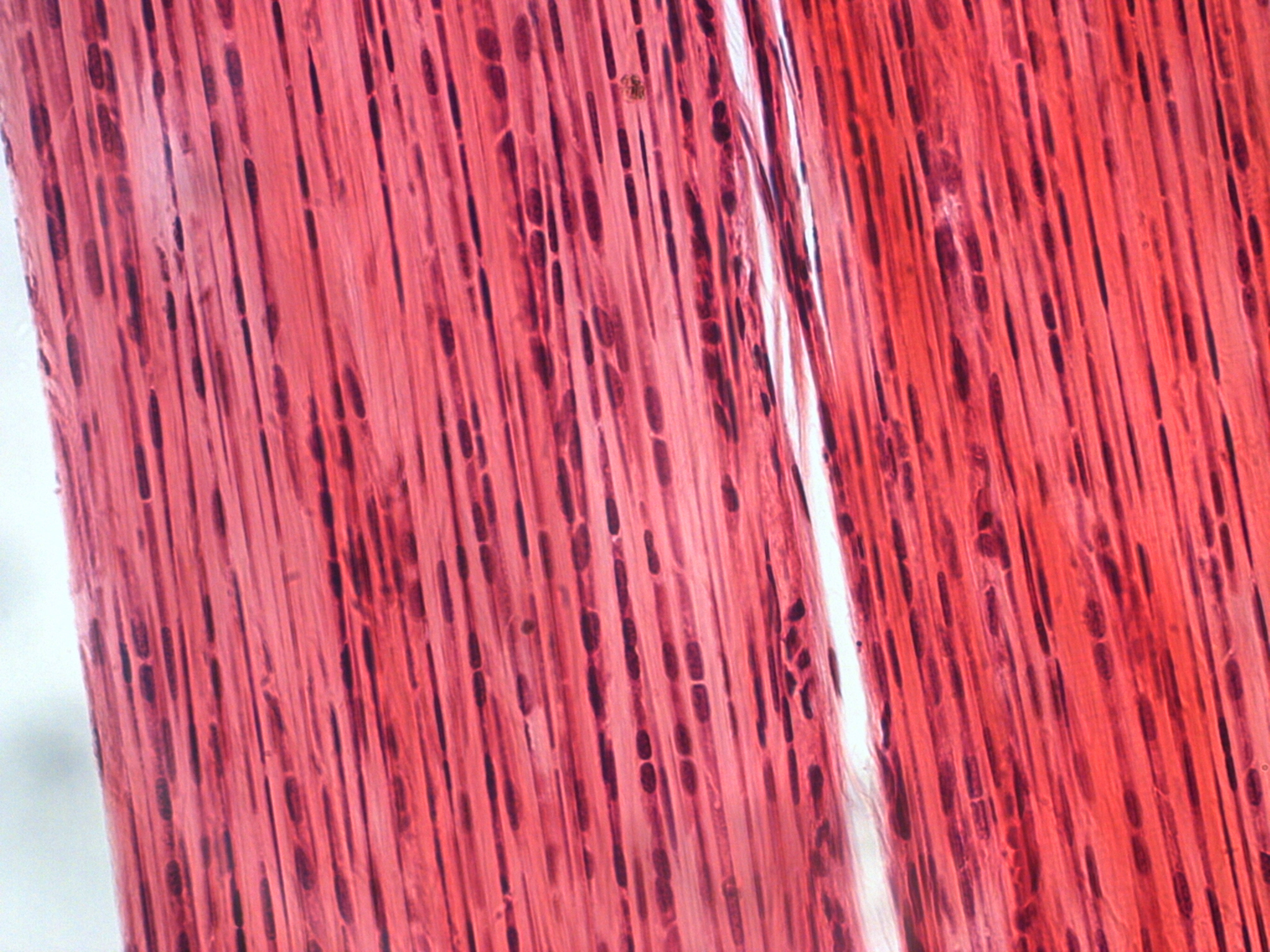
Collagen fibers in a cross-sectional area of dense connective tissue.

Due to their high porosity and large surface area-to-volume ratio, nanofibers are widely used to construct scaffolds for biological applications. Major examples of natural polymers used in scaffold production are collagen, cellulose, silk fibroin, keratin, gelatin and polysaccharides such as chitosan and alginate. Collagen is a natural extracellular component of many connective tissues. Its fibrillary structure, which varies in diameter from 50-500 nm, is important for cell recognition, attachment, proliferation and differentiation. Using type I collagen nanofibers produced via electrospinning, Shih et al. found that the engineered collagen scaffold showed an increase in cell adhesion and decrease in cell migration with increasing fiber diameter. Using silk scaffolds as a guide for growth for bone tissue regeneration, Kim et al. observed complete bone union after 8 weeks and complete healing of defects after 12 weeks whereas the control in which the bone did not have the scaffold displayed limited mending of defects in the same time period. Similarly, keratin, gelatin, chitosan and alginate demonstrate excellent biocompatibility and bioactivity in scaffolds.

However, cellular recognition of natural polymers can easily initiate an immune response. Consequently, synthetic polymers such as poly(lactic acid) (PLA), polycaprolactone (PCL), polyurethane (PU), poly(lactic-co-glycolic acid) (PLGA), poly(L-lactide) (PLLA), and poly(ethylene-co-vinylacetate) (PEVA) have been developed as alternatives for integration into scaffolds. Being biodegradable and biocompatible, these synthetic polymers can be used to form matrices with a fiber diameter within the nanometer range. Out of these synthetic polymers, PCL has generated considerable enthusiasm among researchers. PCL is a type of biodegradable polyester that can be prepared via ring-opening polymerization of ε-caprolactone using catalysts. It shows low toxicity, low cost and slow degradation. PCL can be combined with other materials such as gelatin, collagen, chitosan, and calcium phosphate to improve the differentiation and proliferation capacity (2, 17). PLLA is another popular synthetic polymer. PLLA is well known for its superior mechanical properties, biodegradability and biocompatibility. It shows efficient cell migration ability due to its high spatial interconnectivity, high porosity and controlled alignment. A blend of PLLA and PLGA scaffold matrix has shown proper biomimetic structure, good mechanical strength and favorable bioactivity.

== Applications ==
=== Tissue engineering ===
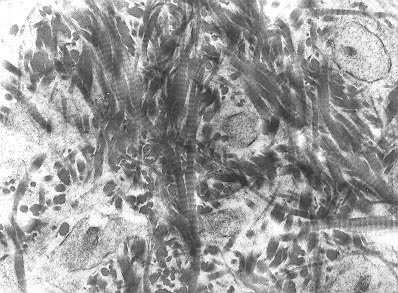
Bone matrix composed of collagen fibrils. Nanofiber scaffolds are able to mimic such structure.

In tissue engineering, a highly porous artificial extracellular matrix is needed to support and guide cell growth and tissue regeneration. Natural and synthetic biodegradable polymers have been used to create such scaffolds.

Simon, in a 1988 NIH SBIR grant report, showed that electrospinning could be used to produce nano- and submicron-scale polystyrene and polycarbonate fibrous mats specifically intended for use as in vitro cell substrates. This early use of electrospun fibrous lattices for cell culture and tissue engineering showed that Human Foreskin Fibroblasts (HFF), transformed Human Carcinoma (HEp-2), and Mink Lung Epithelium (MLE) would adhere to and proliferate upon the fibers.

Nanofiber scaffolds are used in bone tissue engineering to mimic the natural extracellular matrix of the bones. The bone tissue is arranged either in a compact or trabecular pattern and composed of organized structures that vary in length from the centimeter range all the way to the nanometer scale. Nonmineralized organic component (i.e. type 1 collagen), mineralized inorganic component (i.e. hydroxyapatite), and many other noncollagenous matrix proteins (i.e. glycoproteins and proteoglycans) make up the nanocomposite structure of the bone ECM. The organic collagen fibers and the inorganic mineral salts provide flexibility and toughness, respectively, to ECM.

Although the bone is a dynamic tissue that can self-heal upon minor injuries, it cannot regenerate after experiencing large defects such as bone tumor resections and severe nonunion fractures because it lacks the appropriate template. Currently, the standard treatment is autografting which involves obtaining the donor bone from a non-significant and easily accessible site (i.e. iliac crest) in the patient own body and transplanting it into the defective site. Transplantation of autologous bone has the best clinical outcome because it integrates reliably with the host bone and can avoid complications with the immune system. But its use is limited by its short supply and donor site morbidity associated with the harvest procedure. Furthermore, autografted bones are avascular and hence are dependent on diffusion for nutrients, which affects their viability in the host. The grafts can also be resorbed before osteogenesis is complete due to high remodeling rates in the body. Another strategy for treating severe bone damage is allografting which transplants bones harvested from a human cadaver. However, allografts introduce the risk of disease and infection in the host.

Bone tissue engineering presents a versatile response to treat bone injuries and deformations. Nanofibers produced via electrospinning mimics the architecture and characteristics of natural extracellular matrix particularly well. These scaffolds can be used to deliver bioactive agents that promote tissue regeneration. These bioactive materials should ideally be osteoinductive, osteoconductive, and osseointegratable. Bone substitute materials intended to replace autologous or allogeneic bone consist of bioactive ceramics, bioactive glasses, and biological and synthetic polymers. The basis of bone tissue engineering is that the materials will be resorbed and replaced over time by the body's own newly regenerated biological tissue.

Tissue engineering is not only limited to the bone: a large amount of research is devoted to cartilage, ligament, skeletal muscle, skin, blood vessel, and neural tissue engineering as well.

=== Drug delivery ===
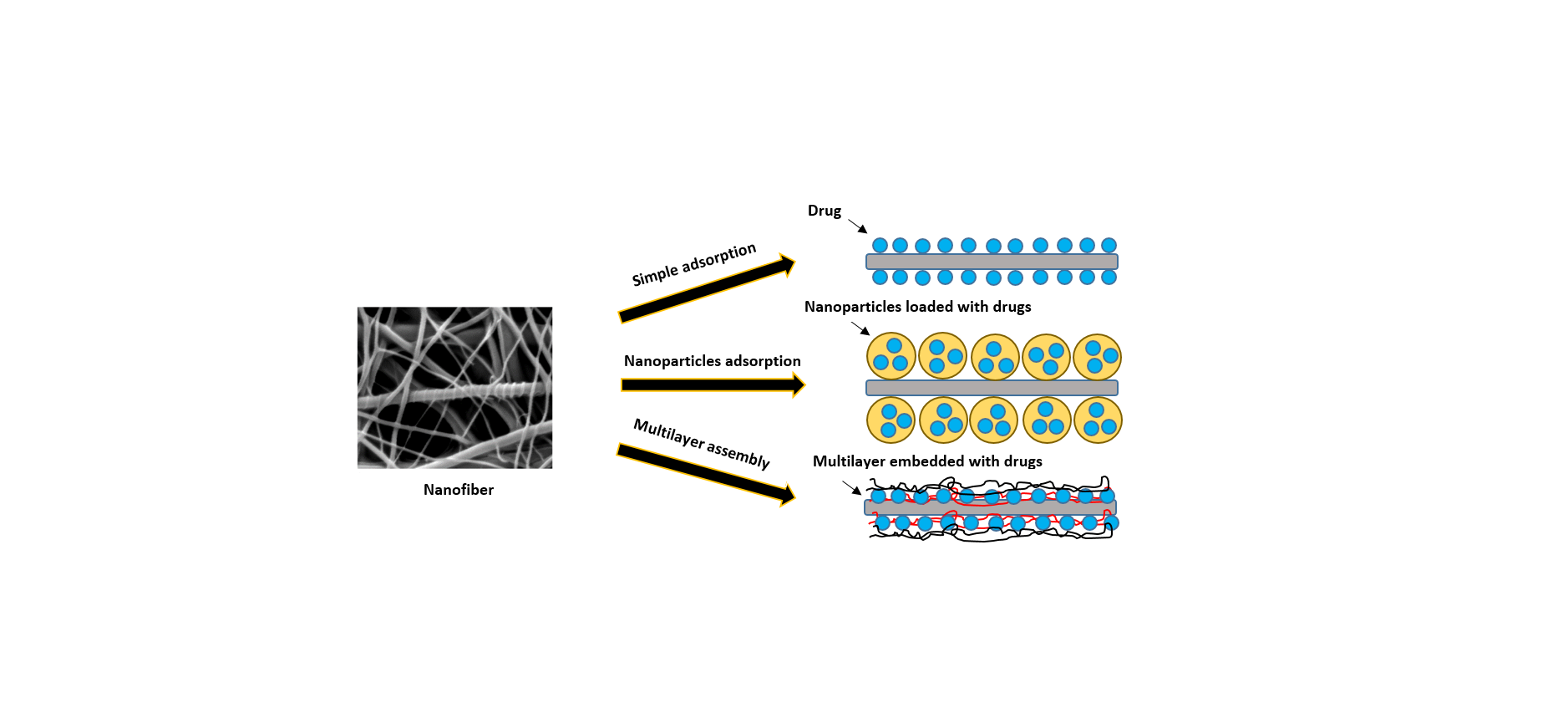
Drugs and biopolymers can be loaded onto nanofibers via simple adsorption, nanoparticles adsorption, and multilayer assembly.

Successful delivery of therapeutics to the intended target largely depends on the choice of the drug carrier. The criteria for an ideal drug carrier include maximum effect upon delivery of the drug to the target organ, evasion of the immune system of the body in the process of reaching the organ, retention of the therapeutic molecules from preparatory stages to the final delivery of the drug, and proper release of the drug for exertion of the intended therapeutic effect. Nanofibers are under study as a possible drug carrier candidate. Natural polymers such as gelatin and alginate make for good fabrication biomaterials for carrier nanofibers because of their biocompatibility and biodegradability that result in no harm to the tissue of the host and no toxic accumulation in the human body, respectively. Due to their cylindrical morphology, nanofibers possess a high surface area-to-volume ratio. As a result, the fibers possess high drug-loading capacity and may release therapeutic molecules over a large surface area. Whereas surface area to volume ratio can only be controlled by adjusting the radius for spherical vesicles, nanofibers have more degrees of freedom in controlling the ratio by varying both the length and the cross-sectional radius. This adjustability is important for their application in drug delivery system in which the functional parameters need to be precisely controlled.

Preliminary studies indicate that antibiotics and anticancer drugs may be encapsulated in electrospun nanofibers by adding the drug into the polymer solution prior to electrospinning. Surface-loaded nanofiber scaffolds are useful as adhesion barriers between internal organs and tissues post-surgery. Adhesion occurs during the healing process and can bring on complications such as chronic pain and reoperation failure.

=== Cancer diagnosis ===
Although pathologic examination is the current standard method for molecular characterization in testing for the presence of biomarkers in tumors, these single-sample analyses fail to account for the diverse genomic nature of tumors. Considering the invasive nature, psychological stress, and the financial burden resulting from repeated tumor biopsies in patients, biomarkers that could be judged through minimally invasive procedures, such as blood draws, constitute an opportunity for progression in precision medicine.

Liquid biopsy is an option that is becoming increasingly popular as an alternative to solid tumor biopsy. This is simply a blood draw that contains circulating tumor cells (CTCs) which are shed into the bloodstream from solid tumors. Patients with metastatic cancer are more likely to have detectable CTCs in the bloodstream but CTCs also exist in patients with localized diseases. It has been found that the number of CTCs present in the bloodstream of patients with metastatic prostate and colorectal cancer is prognostic of the overall survival of tumors. CTCs also have been demonstrated to inform prognosis in earlier stages of the disease.

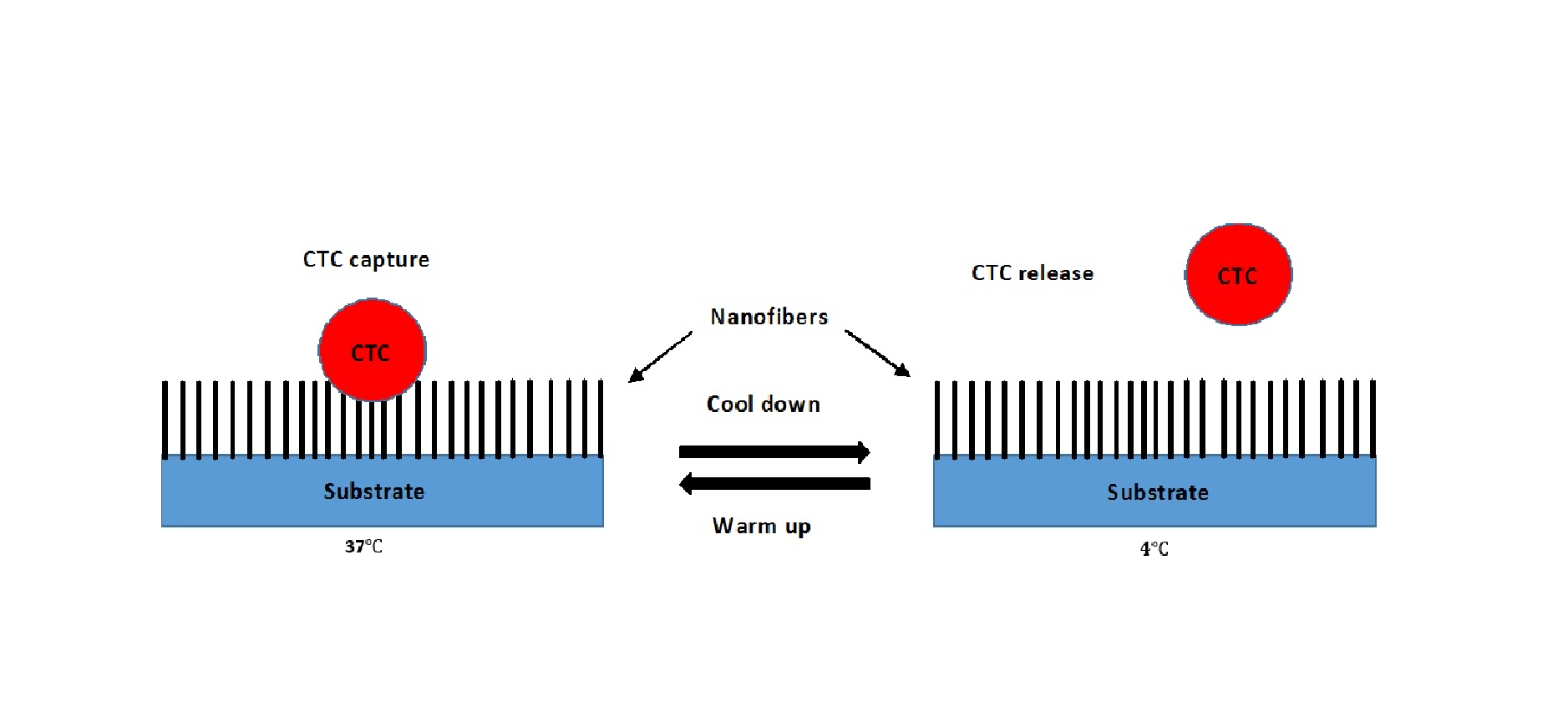
CTC capture and release mechanism of third generation Thermoresponsive Chip.

Recently, Ke et al. developed a NanoVelcro chip that captures the CTCs from the blood samples. When blood is passed through the chip, the nanofibers coated with protein antibodies bind to the proteins expressed on the surface of cancer cells and act like Velcro to trap CTCs for analysis. The NanoVelcro CTC assays underwent three generations of development. The first generation NanoVelcro Chip was created for CTC enumeration for cancer prognosis, staging, and dynamic monitoring. The second generation NanoVelcro-LCM was developed for single-cell CTC isolation. The individually isolated CTCs can be subjected to single-CTC genotyping. The third generation Thermoresponsive Chip allowed for CTC purification. The nanofiber polymer brushes undergo temperature-dependent conformational changes to capture and release CTCs.

=== Lithium-air battery ===
Among many advanced electrochemical energy storage devices, rechargeable lithium-air batteries are of particular interest due to their considerable energy storing capacities and high power densities. As the battery is being used, lithium ions combine with oxygen from the air to form particles of lithium oxides, which attach to carbon fibers on the electrode. During recharging, the lithium oxides separate again into lithium and oxygen which is released back into the atmosphere. This conversion sequence is highly inefficient because there is significant voltage difference of more than 1.2 volts between the output voltage and the charging voltage of the battery meaning that approximately 30% of the electrical energy is lost as heat when the battery is charging. Also the large volume changes resulting from continuous conversion of oxygen between its gaseous and solid state puts stress on the electrode and limits its lifetime.

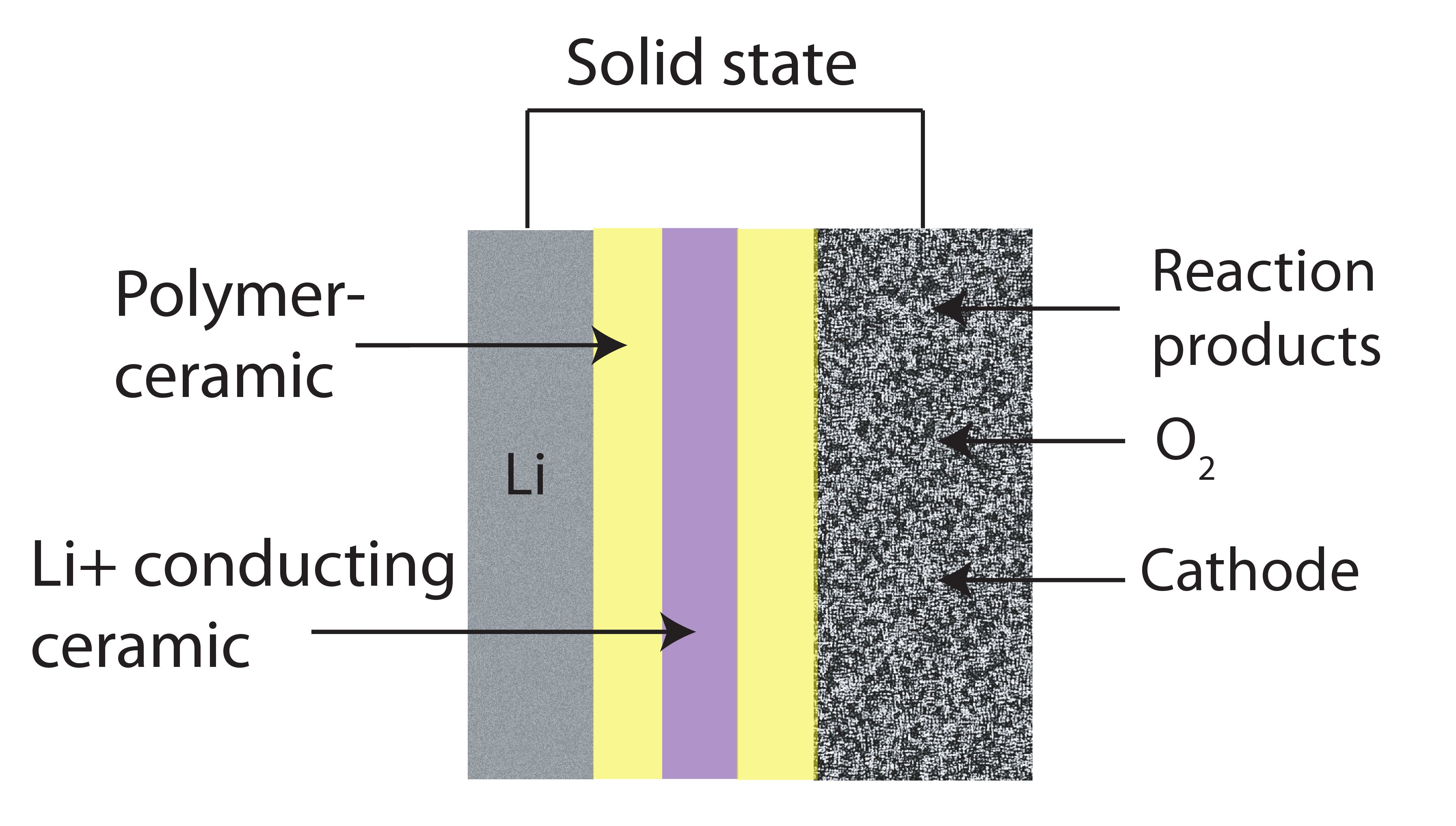
Schematic of a lithium-air battery. For the nanofiber-based lithium-air battery, the cathode would be made up of carbon nanofibers.

The performance of these batteries depends on the characteristics of the material that makes up the cathode. Carbon materials have been widely used as cathodes because of their excellent electrical conductivities, large surface areas, and chemical stability. Especially relevant for lithium-air batteries, carbon materials act as substrates for supporting metal oxides. Binder-free electrospun carbon nanofibers are particularly good potential candidates to be used in electrodes in lithium-oxygen batteries because they have no binders, have open macroporous structures, have carbons that support and catalyze the oxygen reduction reactions, and have versatility.

Zhu et al. developed a novel cathode that can store lithium and oxygen in the electrode they named nanolithia which is a matrix of carbon nanofibers periodically embedded with cobalt oxide. These cobalt oxides provide stability to the normally unstable superoxide-containing nanolithia. In this design, oxygen is stored as LiO_{2} and does not convert between gaseous and solid forms during charging and discharging. When the battery is discharging, lithium ions in nanolithia and react with superoxide oxygen the matrix to form Li_{2}O_{2}, and Li_{2}O. The oxygen remains in its solid state as it transitions among these forms. The chemical reactions of these transitions provide electrical energy. During charging, the transitions occur in reverse.

=== Optical sensors ===
Polymer optical fibers have generated increasing interest in recent years. Because of low cost, ease of handling, long wavelength transparency, great flexibility, and biocompatibility, polymer optical fibers show great potential for short-distance networking, optical sensing and power delivery.

Electrospun nanofibers are particularly well-suitable for optical sensors because sensor sensitivity increases with increasing surface area per unit mass. Optical sensing works by detecting ions and molecules of interest via fluorescence quenching mechanism. Wang et al. successfully developed nanofibrous thin film optical sensors for metal ion (Fe^{3+} and Hg^{2+}) and 2,4-dinitrotoluene (DNT) detection using the electrospinning technique.

Quantum dots show useful optical and electrical properties, including high optical gain and photochemical stability. A variety of quantum dots have been successfully incorporated into polymer nanofibers. Meng et al. showed that quantum dot-doped polymer nanofiber sensor for humidity detection shows fast response, high sensitivity, and long-term stability while requiring low power consumption.

Kelly et al. developed a sensor that warns first responders when the carbon filters in their respirators have become saturated with toxic fume particles. The respirators typically contain activated charcoal that traps airborne toxins. As the filters become saturated, chemicals begin to pass through and render the respirators useless. In order to easily determine when the filter is spent, Kelly and his team developed a mask equipped with a sensor composed of carbon nanofibers assembled into repeating structures called photonic crystals that reflect specific wavelengths of light. The sensors exhibit an iridescent color that changes when the fibers absorb toxins.

=== Air filtration ===
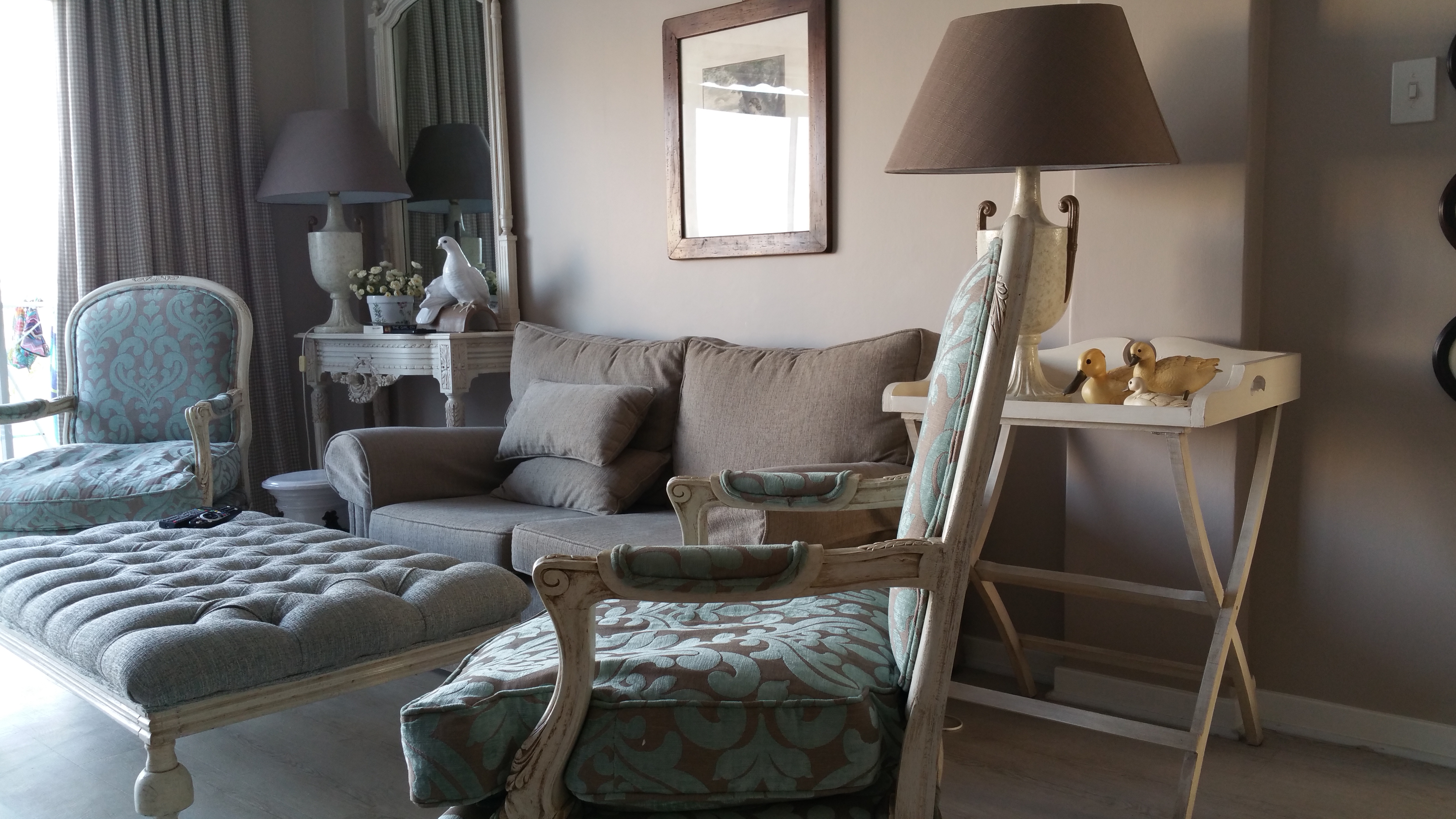
Paints and protective coatings on furniture contain volatile organic compounds such as toluene and formaldehyde.

Electrospun nanofibers are useful for removing volatile organic compounds (VOC) from the atmosphere. Scholten et al. showed that adsorption and desorption of VOC by electrospun nanofibrous membrane were faster than the rates of conventional activated carbon.

Airborne contamination in the personnel cabins of mining equipment is of concern to the mining workers, mining companies, and government agencies such as the Mine Safety and Health Administration (MSHA). Recent work with mining equipment manufacturers and the MSHA has shown that nanofiber filter media can reduce cabin dust concentration to a greater extent compared to standard cellulose filter media.

Nanofibers can be used in masks to protect people from viruses, bacteria, smog, dust, allergens and other particles. Filtration efficiency is at about 99.9% and the principle of filtration is mechanical. Particles in the air are bigger than pores in nanofiber web, but oxygen particles are small enough to pass through.

=== Oil-water separation ===
Nanofibers have the capabilities in oil–water separation, most particularly in sorption process when the material in use has the oleophilic and hydrophobic surfaces. These characteristic enable the nanofibers to be used as a tool to combat either oily waste- water from domestic household and industrial activities, or oily seawater due to the oil run down to the ocean from oil transportation activities and oil tank cleaning on a vessel.

=== Sportswear textile ===
Sportswear textile with nanofiber membrane inside is based on the modern nanofiber technology where the core of the membrane consists of fibers with a diameter 1000× thinner than human hair. This extremely dense "sieve" with more than 2,5 billion of pores per square centimeter works much more efficiently with vapor removal and brings better level of water resistance. In the language of numbers, the nanofiber textile brings the following parameters:

· RET 1.0 vapor permeability and 10,000 mm water column (version preferring breathability)

· RET 4.8 vapor permeability and 30,000 mm water column (version preferring water resistance)

Nanofiber apparel and shoe membranes consist of polyurethane so its production is not harmful to nature. Membranes to sportswear made from nanofiber are recyclable.

== See also ==
- Subwavelength-diameter optical fiber
- Nanofiber seeding
- Polyaniline nanofibers
