= Kureha Corporation =

Japanese manufacturer

- Native name: 株式会社クレハ
- Company type: Public KK
- Traded as: TYO: 4023
- ISIN: JP3271600003
- Industry: Chemicals
- Founded: June 21, 1944; 81 years ago
- Headquarters: Nihonbashi, Chuo-ku, Tokyo, 103-8552, Japan
- Area served: Worldwide
- Key people: Yutaka Kobayashi (President and CEO)
- Products: Functional materials; Specialty chemicals; Plastics
- Revenue: ▲JPY 147.3 billion (FY 2017) (US$ 1.39 billion) (FY 2017)
- Net income: ▲JPY 9.7 billion (FY 2017) (US$ 91.5 million) (FY 2017)
- Number of employees: 4,374 (consolidated, as of March 31, 2018)
- Website: Official website

Kureha Corporation (株式会社クレハ, Kabushiki-gaisha Kureha) is a Japanese manufacturer of specialty chemicals, polymers and agrichemicals.

== Corporate affairs ==
Kureha Chemical Industries is a member of the Mizuho keiretsu.

== Products ==
=== Polyglycolic acid ===
One of the company's long-term investments is in polyglycolic acid (PGA). The company developed a mass scale manufacturing technique for the chemical, which has been a development project of the company since the early 90s. The company has stated a strategy of committing to invest in PGA for a long period, patiently waiting for market demand to develop. To manufacture PGA, the company invested 100 million in a manufacturing facility in Belle, West Virginia to be located nearby a Dupont plant that produces glycolic acid, a primary feedstock for PGA.

=== Polyphenylene sulfide ===
Kureha is the world's largest producer of polyphenylene sulfide, a heat-resistant polymer is used in industrial applications such as automotive electronics. The polymer its produced at the company's site in Iwaki, Japan and in Wilmington, United States by Fortron Industries, a joint venture of Kureha and Celanese.
