= DIC Corporation =

Japanese chemicals company

DIC Corporation DIC株式会社
- Company logo used since 2008
- Formerly: Dainippon Ink Manufacturing Co., Ltd. (1937–1962); Dainippon Ink and Chemicals Inc. (1962–2008)
- Type: Public
- Traded as: TYO: 4631
- Industry: Chemicals
- Founded: Tokyo, Japan February 1908; 118 years ago
- Founder: Kijuro Kawamura
- Headquarters: Waterras Tower, 101, Kanda Awajicho 2-chome, Chiyoda-ku, Tokyo 101-0063, Japan
- Key people: Kazuo Sugie, (chairman); Yoshiyuki Nakanishi, (CEO and president)
- Products: Inks; Pigments; Colorants; Polymers; Coating materials; Adhesives; Liquid crystals; Multilayer films; PPS compounds; Fluorochemical products; Plastic compounds; Hollow-fiber membrane modules; Spirulina
- Revenue: ▲¥ 1054.2 billion JPY (FY2022)
- Net income: ▼¥ 39.7 billion JPY (FY2022)
- Number of employees: Consolidated 22,474 (As of December 31, 2021)
- Website: Official website

DIC Corporation (DIC株式会社, Dī Ai Shī Kabushiki-gaisha) is a Japanese chemical company, specializing in the development, manufacture and sale of inks, pigments, polymers, specialty plastics and compounds and biochemicals.

It was founded in 1908 as Kawamura Ink Manufactory, renamed to Kawamura Kijuro Shoten in 1915, incorporated as Dainippon Printing Ink Manufacturing in 1937 and renamed to Dainippon Ink and Chemicals (DIC) in 1962 before the name was changed to the present name DIC Corporation in 2008 on the occasion of its 100th anniversary. The company slogan "Color & Comfort By Chemistry" suggests that DIC products should deliver color and comfort to daily life.

The company operates worldwide (through 176 subsidiary and affiliate companies in 62 countries) and includes the Sun Chemical corporation, based in the Americas and Europe.

DIC in Japan has 10 plants in Japan, located in Tokyo, Chiba, Hokuriku, Sakai, Kashima, Yokkaichi, Shiga, Komaki, Saitama, and Tatebayashi. The main research laboratory in Japan is located in Sakura, Chiba cooperating with DIC development centers in China (Qingdao DIC Finechemicals Co., Ltd., Qingdao, China) and the Sun Chemical Group's research laboratories (in USA, Germany and UK).

The company is listed on the Tokyo Stock Exchange.

== History ==
- 1908 Founded as Kawamura Ink Manufactory
- 1937 Incorporated Dainippon Printing Ink Manufacturing
- 1950 Listed on the Tokyo Stock Exchange
- 1962 Merged with Japan Reichhold, changed Company name to Dainippon Ink and Chemicals
- 1986 Acquired Sun Chemical's Graphic Art Material Dept.
- 1987 Acquired Reichhold Chemicals, Inc.
- 1999 Acquired Totalfina S.A.'s Printing Ink Dept. (Coates)
- 2005 Sold Reichhold
- 2008 Changed Company name to DIC Corporation
- 2009 Established DIC Graphics, joint venture with Dai Nippon Printing (DNP) integrating DIC's domestic printing ink business and DNP's printing ink business
- 2021 Acquired BASF's Global Pigments Business, known as BASF Colors & Effects (BCE)

== Business and products ==
DIC is divided in 3 business units and 6 product divisions

=== Packaging & Graphic ===
- Printing Material Products Division : Offset inks, gravure inks, flexo inks, metal decorative inks, security inks, printing plates, jet inks, news inks
- Packaging Material Products Division: Packaging adhesives, coextruded multilayer films, polystyrene (hyperbranched, GPPS, HIPS).

=== Color & Display ===
- Color Material Products Division: pigments for printing inks, pigments for coatings and plastics, pigments for specialty applications, pigments for color filters, pigments for cosmetics and health foods (Spirulina)
- Display Material Products Division: Thin-Film transistor liquid crystal (TFT LC), Supertwisted nematic liquid crystal (STN LC)

=== Functional Product ===
- Performance Material Products Division: general polymers (alkyd resins, unsaturated polyester resins, plasticizers, waterborne resins, acrylic resins, phenolic resins) specialty polymers (epoxy resins, ultraviolet (UV)-curable resins, polyurethane resins, fluorochemicals), metal carboxylates, sulphur chemicals, fiber and textile colorants
- Composite Material Products Division: polyphenylene sulfide (PPS) compounds, interior housing products, industrial adhesive tapes, plastic colorants, high-performance optical materials, Hollow-fiber membranes, medical diagnostics products

=== DIC Color System Guide ===
The DIC Color System Guide is a spot color system, based on Munsell color theory. It is common in Japan, and comparable in role to the Pantone systems.

=== Manufacturing facilities ===
The company recently inaugurated an advanced toluene-free plant for liquid ink manufacturing called Optima. This is DIC’s fifth plant in India, located at Sakhya in Bharuch district, Gujarat.

The plant is built on an area of 92,500 sq. m, occupying 45,000 sq. m of the plot to cater to a growing demand for Toluene Free/Keyone Free (TF, KF/NTNK) inks in the country.

Under phase I, the plant has a capacity of 10,000 Tonnes of TF, KF/NTNK liquid inks in two shifts. DIC India further plans to expand the plant to manufacture value-added and specialty products for the domestic and export markets. The company plans to use the remaining plot area to build plants for different types of products in its operations.

The new plant is expected to provide employment to over 100 people and boost the company’s access to the Northern and Western markets due to its location at the center of the chemical hub in India.

DIC India’s other four plants are located in Uttar Pradesh, Ahmedabad (Gujarat), Kolkata, and Karnataka.

== Cultural activities ==
- DIC owns 47.7% of the sports club chain "Renaissance".
- In 1990, the company established the Kawamura Memorial DIC Museum of Art to exhibit artwork collected by the company and its affiliates. The museum is located in a 30-hectare park near to its Central Research Laboratories. According to a DIC management decision, partially attributed to shareholder pressure, the museum will close on February 1, 2025.

== Gallery ==
DIC Corporation locations
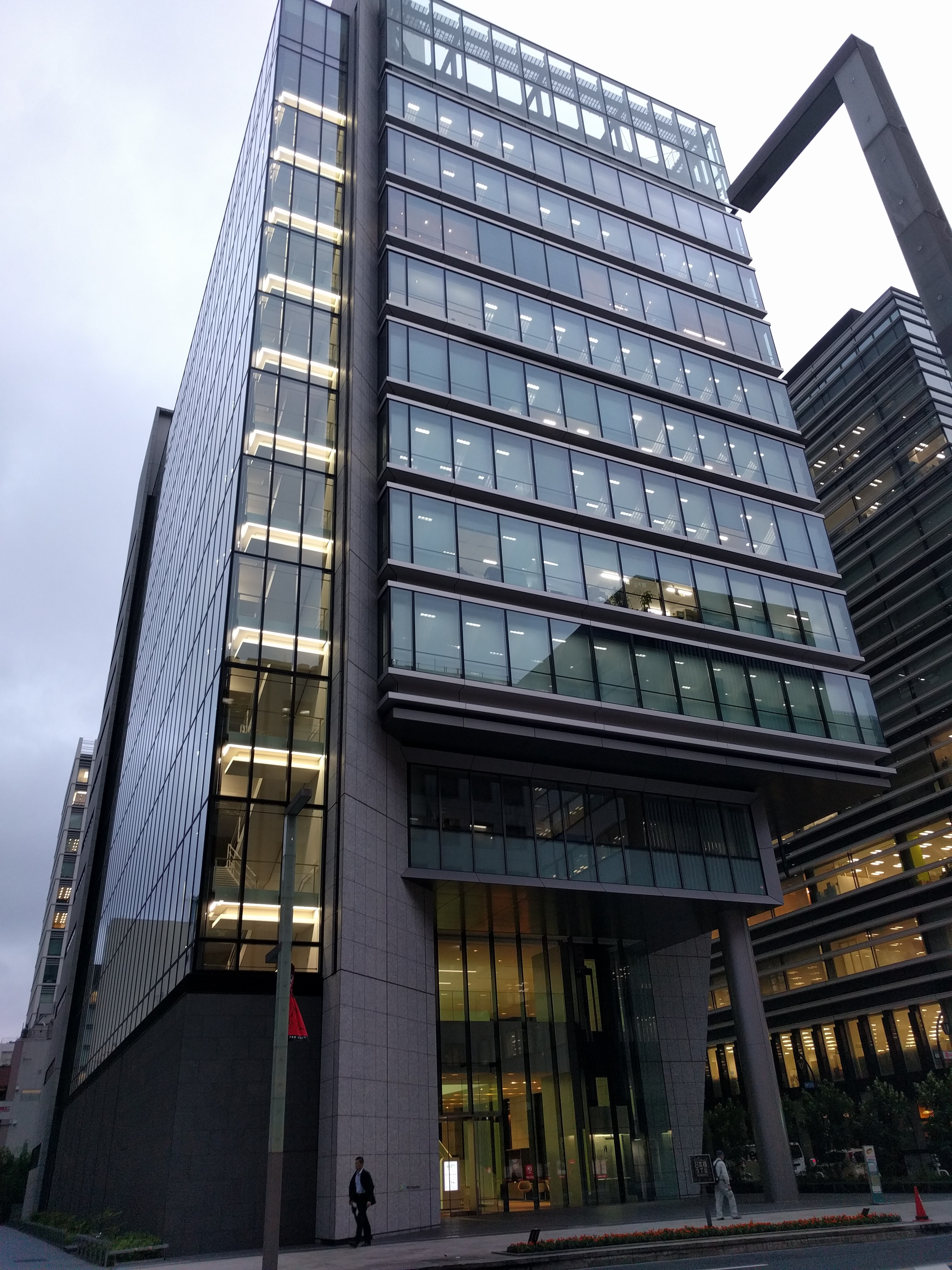
New DIC headquarters building in Tokyo

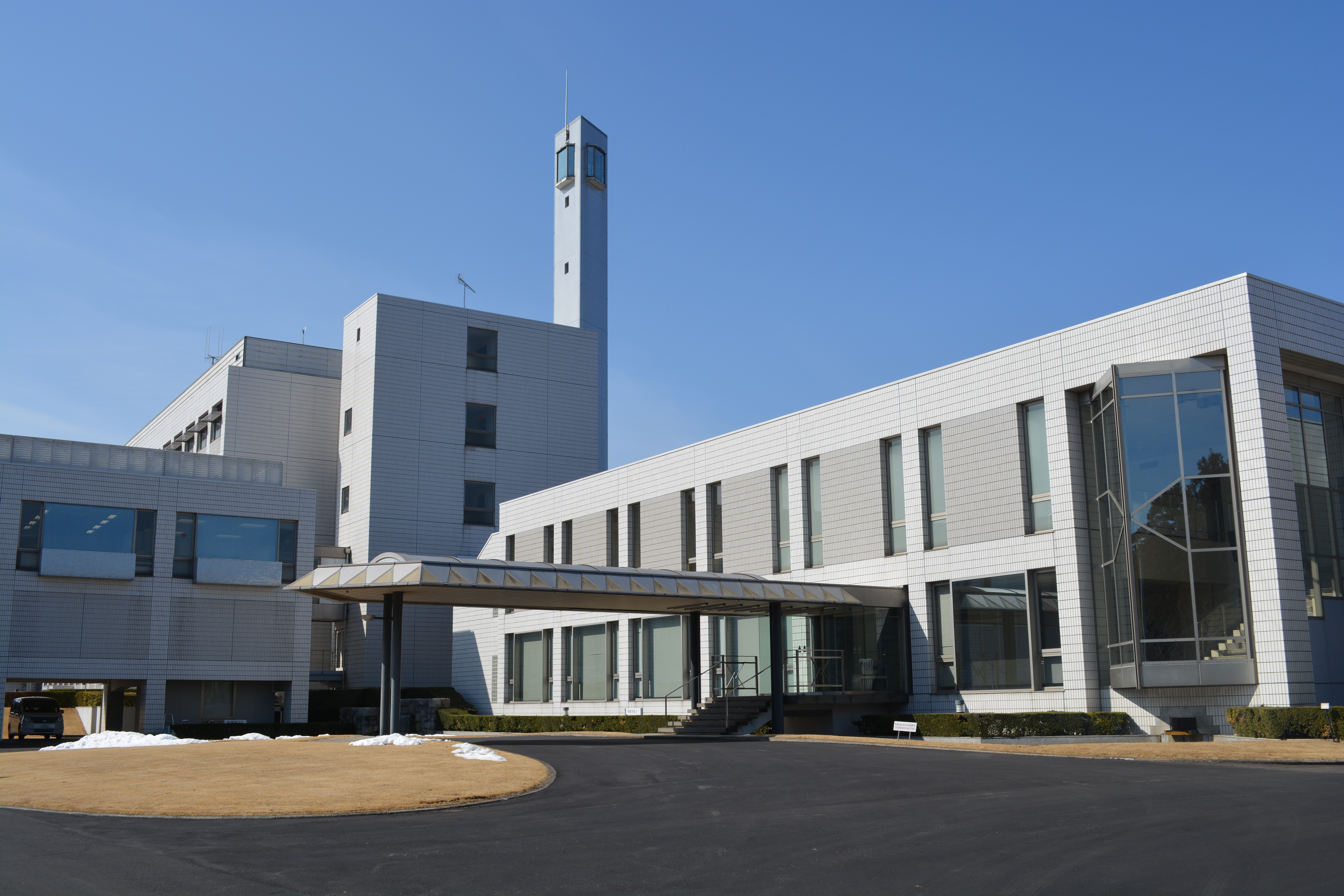
DIC Central Research Laboratories in Sakura

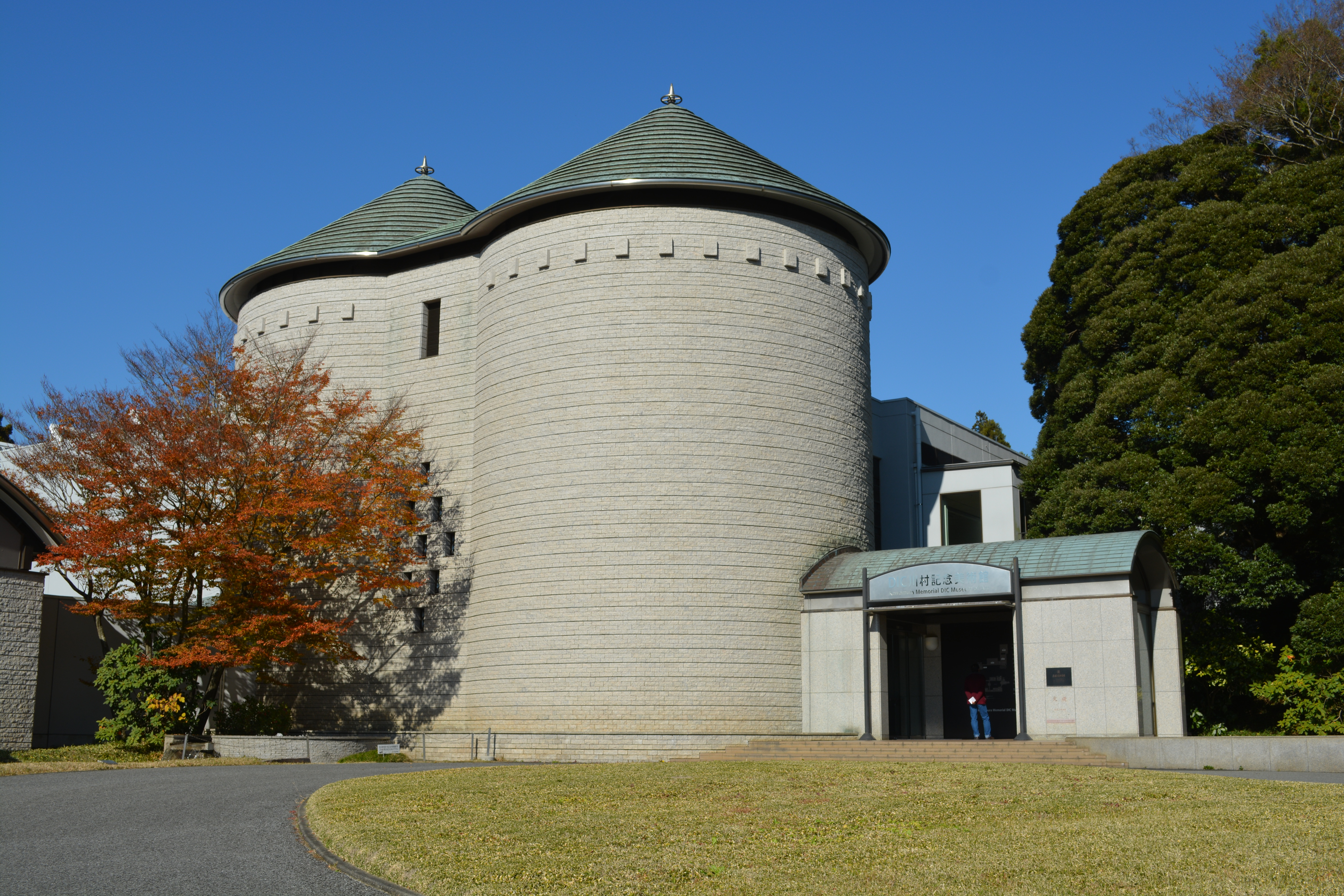
Kawamura Memorial DIC Museum of Art also in Sakura
