= Subwavelength-diameter optical fibre =

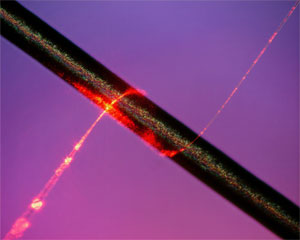
A subwavelength-diameter fibre wraps light around human hair.

A subwavelength-diameter optical fibre (SDF or SDOF) is an optical fibre whose diameter is less than the wavelength of the light being propagated through it. An SDF usually consists of long thick parts (same as conventional optical fibres) at both ends, transition regions (tapers) where the fibre diameter gradually decreases down to the subwavelength value, and a subwavelength-diameter waist, which is the main acting part. Due to such a strong geometrical confinement, the guided electromagnetic field in an SDF is restricted to a single transverse spatial mode called fundamental.

== Name ==
There is no general agreement on how these optical elements are to be named; different groups prefer to emphasize different properties of such fibres, sometimes even using different terms. The names in use include subwavelength waveguide, subwavelength optical wire, subwavelength-diameter silica wire, subwavelength diameter fibre taper, (photonic) wire waveguide, photonic wire, photonic nanowire, optical nanowires, optical fibre nanowires, tapered (optical) fibre, fibre taper, submicron-diameter silica fibre, ultrathin optical fibres, optical nanofibre, optical microfibres, submicron fibre waveguides, micro/nano optical wires (MNOW).

The term waveguide can be applied not only to fibres, but also to other waveguiding structures such as silicon photonic subwavelength waveguides. The term submicron is often synonymous to subwavelength, as the majority of experiments are carried out using light with a wavelength between 0.5 and 1.6 μm. All the names with the prefix nano- are somewhat misleading, since it is usually applied to objects with dimensions on the scale of nanometers (e.g., nanoparticle, nanotechnology). The characteristic behaviour of the SDF appears when the fibre diameter is about half of the wavelength of light. That is why the term subwavelength is the most appropriate for these objects.

== Manufacturing ==
An SDF is usually created by tapering a commercial, usually step-index, optical fibre. Special pulling machines accomplish the process.

An optical fibre usually consists of a core, a cladding, and a protective coating. Before pulling a fibre, its coating is removed (i.e., the fibre is stripped). The ends of the bare fibre are fixed onto movable "translation" stages on the machine. The middle of the fibre (between the stages) is then heated with a flame (such as of burning oxyhydrogen) or a laser beam; at the same time, the translation stages move in opposite directions. The glass melts and the fibre is elongated, while its diameter decreases.

Using the described method, waists between 1 and 10 mm in length and diameters down to 100 nm are obtained. In order to minimize the losses of light to unbound modes, one must control the pulling process so that the tapering angles satisfy the adiabatic condition by not exceeding a certain value, usually in the order of a few milliradian. For this purpose, a laser beam is coupled to the fibre being pulled and the output light is monitored by an optical power meter throughout the whole process. A good-quality SDF would transmit over 95% of the coupled light, most losses being due to scattering on the surface imperfections or impurities at the waist region.

If the fibre being tapered is uniformly pulled over a stationary heating source, the resulting SDF has an exponential radius profile. In many cases it is convenient to have a cylindrical waist region, that is the waist of a constant thickness. Fabrication of such a fibre requires continuous adjustments of the hotzone by moving the heating source, and the fabrication process becomes significantly longer.

== Handling ==
Being extremely thin, an SDF is also extremely fragile. Therefore, an SDF is usually mounted onto a special frame immediately after pulling and is never detached from this frame. The common way of securing a fibre to the mount is by a polymer glue such as an epoxy resin or an optical adhesive.

Dust, however, may attach to the surface of an SDF. If significant laser power is coupled into the fibre, the dust particles will scatter light in the evanescent field, heat up, and may thermally destroy the waist. In order to prevent this, SDFs are pulled and used in dust-free environments such as flowboxes or vacuum chambers. For some applications, it is useful to immerse the freshly tapered SDF into purified water and thus protect the waist from contamination.

== Applications ==
Applications include sensors, nonlinear optics, fibre couplers, atom trapping and guiding, quantum interface for quantum information processing, all-optical switches, optical manipulation of dielectric particles.

Subwavelength-diameter optical fibers have various applications owing to the special conditions of confining light in nanoscale dimensions. Some of the key usages are:

=== Sensing ===
The SDFs increase the sensitivities to environment factors like temperature and humidity.

=== Nonlinear Optics ===
They play an important role in second-order harmonic generation and in all-optical switching processes, important in photonics and quantum communication.

=== Atom Trapping and Quantum Interface ===
These fibers make the manipulation of atoms and photons possible; thus, they are very vital in quantum information processing.

=== Optical Manipulation ===
SDFs are used for moving nanoparticles in optical tweezers, useful in nanotechnology.

Their broad applications make them fundamental in advanced optics and quantum technologies.

== See also ==
- Double-clad fiber
