= Polyaniline =

Conducting semi-flexible rod polymer

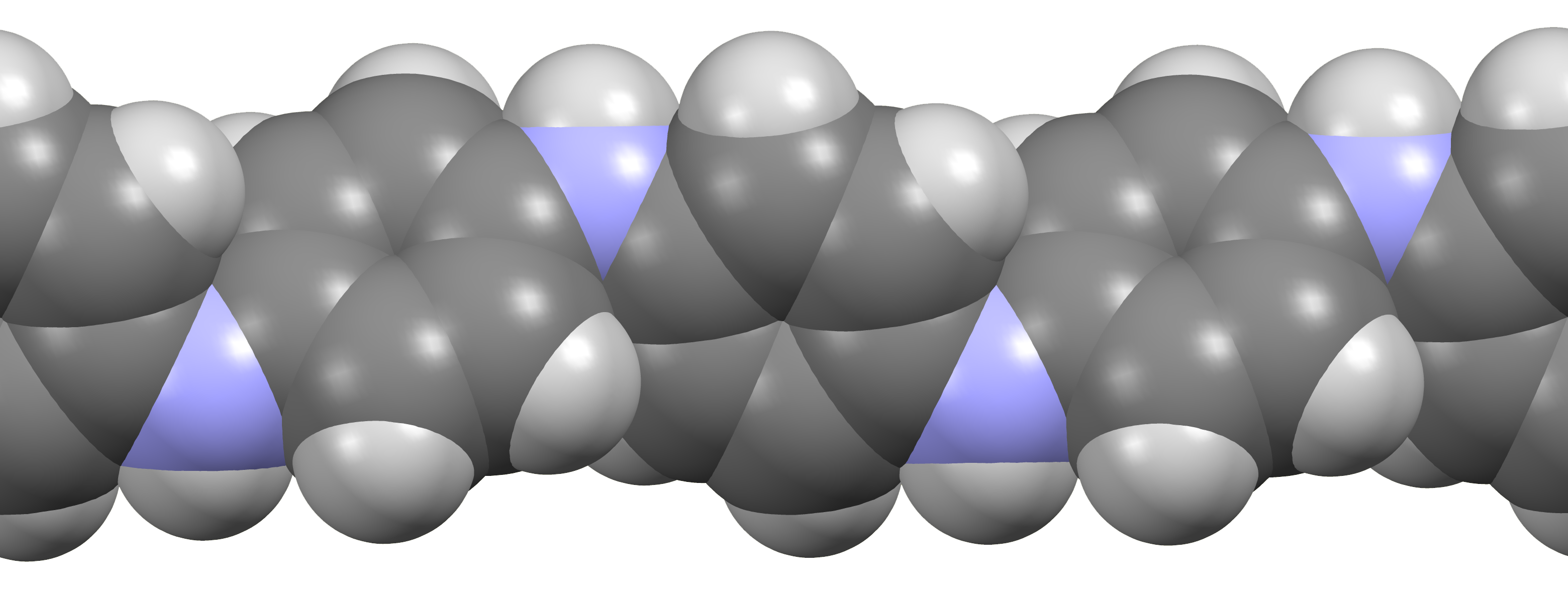
Space-filling model of the local structure of a polyaniline chain in the reduced leucoemeraldine base (LEB) oxidation state, based on the crystal structure of the tetramer.

Polyaniline (PANI) is a conducting polymer and organic semiconductor of the semi-flexible rod polymer family. The compound has been of interest since the 1980s because of unique electrical and mechanical properties. Polyaniline is one of the most studied conducting polymers.

== History ==
Polyaniline was discovered in the 1800s by Friedlieb Ferdinand Runge (1794–1867), Carl Fritzsche (1808–1871), John Lightfoot (1831–1872), and Henry Letheby (1816–1876). Lightfoot studied the oxidation of aniline, which had been isolated only 20 years previously. He developed the first commercially successful route to a polymeric dye called Aniline black. The first definitive report of polyaniline did not occur until 1862, which included an electrochemical method for the determination of small quantities of aniline.

== Structure ==
Structures of 3 idealized forms of polyaniline. In the figure, (n, m) can be one of (0, 1), (1, 0), (0.5, 0.5). x denotes how many times the structure is repeated, which equals half the degree of polymerization (DP).

Polymerized from the inexpensive aniline, polyaniline can be found in one of three idealized oxidation states:

- leucoemeraldine – white/clear & colorless (C_{6}H_{4}NH)_{n}. (n, m) = (1, 0). It is the fully reduced state, with only amine links.
- emeraldine – green for the emeraldine salt, blue for the emeraldine base ([C_{6}H_{4}NH]_{2}[C_{6}H_{4}N]_{2})_{n}. (n, m) = (0.5, 0.5).
- (per)nigraniline – blue/violet (C_{6}H_{4}N)_{n}. (n, m) = (0, 1), it is the fully oxidized state, with only imine links.

Most forms of polyaniline are one of the three states or physical mixtures of these components.

Emeraldine is also called emeraldine base (EB). It is neutral, if doped (protonated) it is called emeraldine salt (ES), with the imine nitrogens protonated by an acid. Protonation helps to delocalize the otherwise trapped diiminoquinone-diaminobenzene state. Emeraldine base is regarded as the most useful form of polyaniline due to its high stability at room temperature and the fact that, upon doping with acid, the resulting emeraldine salt form of polyaniline is highly electrically conducting. Leucoemeraldine and pernigraniline are poor conductors, even when doped with an acid.

The colour change associated with polyaniline in different oxidation states can be used in sensors and electrochromic devices. Polyaniline sensors typically exploit changes in electrical conductivity between the different oxidation states or doping levels. Treatment of emeraldine with acids increases the electrical conductivity by up to ten orders of magnitude. Undoped polyaniline has a conductivity of 6.28×10^{−9} S/m, whereas conductivities of 4.60×10^{−5} S/m can be achieved by doping to 4% HBr. The same material can be prepared by oxidation of leucoemeraldine.

=== Synthesis ===
Although the synthetic methods to produce polyaniline are quite simple, the mechanism of polymerization is probably complex. The formation of leucoemeraldine can be described as follows, where [O] is a generic oxidant:

n C_{6}H_{5}NH_{2} + [O] → [C_{6}H_{4}NH]_{n} + H_{2}O

A common oxidant is ammonium persulfate in 1 M hydrochloric acid (other acids can be used). The polymer precipitates as an unstable dispersion with micrometer-scale particulates.

(Per)nigraniline is prepared by oxidation of the emeraldine base with a peracid:

{[C_{6}H_{4}NH]_{2}[C_{6}H_{4}N]_{2}}_{n} + RCO_{3}H → [C_{6}H_{4}N]_{n} + H_{2}O + RCO_{2}H

Aniline can also be electrochemically polymerised directly onto conductive surfaces without the use of a chemical oxidant.

=== Processing ===
The synthesis of polyaniline nanostructures is easy.

Using surfactant dopants, the polyaniline can be made dispersible and hence useful for practical applications. Bulk synthesis of polyaniline nanofibers has been researched extensively.

A multi-stage model for the formation of emeraldine base is proposed. In the first stage of the reaction the pernigraniline PS salt oxidation state is formed. In the second stage pernigraniline is reduced to the emeraldine salt as aniline monomer gets oxidized to the radical cation. In the third stage this radical cation couples with ES salt. This process can be followed by light scattering analysis which allows the determination of the absolute molar mass. According to one study in the first step a DP of 265 is reached with the DP of the final polymer at 319. Approximately 19% of the final polymer is made up of the aniline radical cation which is formed during the reaction.

Polyaniline is typically produced in the form of long-chain polymer aggregates, surfactant (or dopant) stabilized nanoparticle dispersions, or stabilizer-free nanofiber dispersions depending on the supplier and synthetic route. Surfactant or dopant stabilized polyaniline dispersions have been available for commercial sale since the late 1990s.

== Mechanical Properties ==
In addition to its electronic characteristics, the mechanical properties of polyaniline are important for its potential applications in batteries, sensors, and membranes. As a conducting filler for various blends, the mechanical properties of the base polyaniline powder are usually overlooked. Measurements on compressed PANI pellets gave the Young's modulus to be around 1.3 GPa, which is comparable to other common polymers.

=== Polyaniline films ===
In contrast, the mechanical properties of polyaniline films cast from polyaniline in 1-methyl-2-pyrrolidinone (NMP) have been more thoroughly investigated. The glass transition temperature (T_{g}) for the polyaniline film occurs around 105 – 220 °C and is strongly dependent on the residual NMP solvent content in the films, which acts as a plasticizer to reduce T_{g}. Utilizing dynamic mechanical analysis techniques, it has been shown that the storage modulus (E') of polyaniline films is around 0.2 to 2 GPa when below T_{g}. At temperatures above T_{g}, the film enters a rubbery state and becomes more flexible which results in a decrease of E' to as low as 0.1 MPa. Further increases in temperature result in a return of stiffness and higher E' due to crosslinking and ordering of the chains before the breakdown of the films at 400 °C. While decreasing the elasticity of the film, the crosslinking of polyaniline chains has been shown to increase the conductivity and tensile strength compared to non-crosslinked films.

=== Polyaniline blends ===
Due to the poor solubility of PANI, the creation of blends with commercial polymers for better processibility is of significant interest Polyaniline-polyvinyl alcohol blends (PANI-PVA) shown that tensile strength that depends strongly on the PANI concentration, with the maintenance of the tensile strength up to 5%. At concentrations above 5%, the brittle characteristics of pristine PANI become dominant resulting in a dramatic decrease in the tensile strength and elongation. A similar behavior was observed in a study with a PANI-chitosan hydrogel blend which also observed a decrease in tensile strength with an increase in acid doping to improve conductivity.

== Potential applications ==
The major applications are printed circuit board manufacturing: final finishes, used in millions of m^{2} every year, antistatic and ESD coatings, and corrosion protection. Polyaniline and its derivatives are also used as the precursor for the production of N-doped carbon materials through high-temperature heat treatment. Printed emeraldine polyaniline-based sensors have also gained much attention for widespread applications where devices are typically fabricated via screen, inkjet or aerosol jet printing.
