= Tosoh =

Japanese chemical company

Tosoh Corporation
- Native name: 東ソー株式会社
- Company type: Public (K.K)
- Traded as: TYO: 4042; Nikkei 225 Component
- Industry: Chemicals
- Founded: February 11, 1935; 91 years ago
- Headquarters: 3-8-2, Shiba, Minato-Ku, Tokyo 105-8623, Japan
- Key people: Tokusaburō Iwase, (Founder); Kenichi Udagawa, (CEO and President)
- Products: Bioscience systems; Chemicals; Petrochemicals; Specialty materials; Water treatment technologies
- Revenue: ▼$ 7.107 billion USD (FY 2012) (¥ 668.494 billion JPY) (FY 2012)
- Net income: ▲$ 179.341 million USD (FY 2012) (¥ 16.867 billion JPY) (FY 2012)
- Number of employees: 11,268 (consolidated) (as of March 31, 2012)
- Website: Official website

Tosoh Corporation (東ソー株式会社, Tōsō Kabushiki-gaisha) is a global chemical and specialty materials company. The company was founded in 1935 in Yamaguchi Prefecture, as Toyo Soda Manufacturing Co., Ltd., and changed its name to Tosoh Corporation in 1987. Today, its corporate headquarters are in Tokyo, Japan.

Tosoh Corporation began as a manufacturer of chlor-alkali and petrochemical commodities and feedstocks. Today, the company produces other kinds of products including electrolytic manganese dioxide (EMD), specialty polymers, fine chemicals, scientific instruments, and thin-film materials.

The Tosoh Group globally comprises more than 130 companies and includes manufacturing and marketing facilities in East Asia, Europe and the United States.

The company is listed on the first section of the Tokyo Stock Exchange and is a constituent of the Nikkei 225 stock index.

Tosoh's Nanyo complex has an annual vinyl chloride monomer production capacity of 1.2 million tons, the primary chemical intermediate of vinyl plastic.

Tosoh is a member of the Mizuho keiretsu.

Tosoh acquired Nippon Polyurethane Industry in 2006 and absorbed into Tosoh in 2014.

== Business groups and products ==
Tosoh Corporation is divided into 13 business divisions organized into five groups: Petrochemical, Chlor-Alkali, Speciality, Engineering, and a fifth group composed of support services, including logistics, construction, engineering support, and other support activities. Listed below are the five groups and their primary products:

- Petrochemical Group
  - Olefins: ethylene, propylene and polypropylene, tert-Butanol, and aromatics.
  - Polymers: LDPE, LLDPE, HDPE, synthetic rubber, polychloroprene rubber, etc.
- Chlor-Alkali Group
  - Basic Chemicals: calcium hypochlorite, sodium hydroxide, chlorinated paraffins, sodium bicarb, vinyl chloride monomer, and polyvinylchloride.
  - Methylene diphenyl diisocyanate (MDI).
  - Cement: Portland cement, blast-furnace slag cement, and fly ash cement.
- Specialty Group
  - Organic Chemicals: organic intermediates, ethyleneamines, flame retardants, polyurethane catalysts, benzyl alcohol, hydrocarbon based solvents, piperazine, sodium styrene sulfonate, and bromochloropropane(BCP).
  - Advanced Materials: silica glass, sputtering deposition targets, zeolites, zirconia injection mold and grinding media, battery materials, and silica.
  - Bio-science: automated immunoassay and glycohemoglobin analyzers, high-performance liquid chromatography (HPLC), molecular analyzers, chromatographic resins, size-exclusion chromatography instruments, laboratory automation solutions and services, and reagents.

The Specialty Group focuses on products for high-tech industries such as semiconductors, consumer electronics, pharmaceuticals, and healthcare.

- Engineering Group
  - Water Treatment
- Other Services Group
  - Analytical Services
  - Information Technology
  - Personnel Management
  - Logistics
