= Motion JPEG =

Video compression format

Motion JPEG (M-JPEG or MJPEG) is a video compression format in which each video frame or interlaced field of a digital video sequence is compressed separately as a JPEG image.

Originally developed for multimedia PC applications, Motion JPEG enjoys broad client support: most major web browsers and players provide native support, and plug-ins are available for the rest. Software and devices using the M-JPEG standard include media players, game consoles, digital cameras, IP cameras, webcams, streaming servers, video cameras, and non-linear video editors.

== History ==
Motion JPEG was originally developed for multimedia PC applications.

Early implementations of MJPEG were generally implemented in hardware. C-Cube was an early proponent with their CL550 JPEG codec being used in several hardware implementations. It was announced that the NeXTdimension from NeXT would ship with an onboard CL550 to implement MJPEG. This was however later shelved and wasn't included in the final product that was shipped.

Apple provided a software implementation of MJPEG in their QuickTime Player in the mid-1990s.

== Design ==
M-JPEG is an intraframe-only compression scheme (compared with the more computationally intensive technique of interframe prediction). Whereas modern interframe video formats, such as MPEG1, MPEG2 and H.264/MPEG-4 AVC, achieve real-world compression ratios of 1:50 or better, M-JPEG's lack of interframe prediction limits its efficiency to 1:20 or lower, depending on the tolerance to spatial artifacting in the compressed output. Because frames are compressed independently of one another, M-JPEG imposes lower processing and memory requirements on hardware devices.

As a purely intraframe compression scheme, the image quality of M-JPEG is directly a function of each video frame's static (spatial) complexity. Frames with large smooth transitions or monotone surfaces compress well and are more likely to hold their original details with few visible compression artifacts. Frames exhibiting complex textures, fine curves and lines (such as writing on a newspaper) are prone to exhibit discrete cosine transform (DCT) artifacts such as ringing, smudging and macroblocking. M-JPEG-compressed video is also insensitive to motion complexity, i.e. variation over time. It is neither hindered by highly random motion (such as the water-surface turbulence in a large waterfall), nor helped by the absence of motion (such as static landscape shot by tripod), which are two opposite extremes commonly used to test interframe video formats.

For QuickTime formats, Apple has defined two types of coding: MJPEG-A and MJPEG-B. MJPEG-B no longer retains valid JPEG Interchange Files within it, hence it is not possible to take a frame into a JPEG file without slightly modifying the headers.

JPEG is inefficient, using more bits to deliver similar quality, compared to more modern formats (such as JPEG 2000 and H.264/MPEG-4 AVC). Since the development of the original JPEG standard in the early 1990s, technology improvements have been made not only to the JPEG format but to the interframe compression schemas possible as well.

== Features ==
Motion JPEG is simple to implement because it uses a mature compression standard (JPEG) with well-developed libraries, and it is an intraframe method of compression.

It tolerates rapidly changing motion in the video stream, whereas compression schemes using interframe compression can often experience unacceptable quality loss when the video content changes significantly between each frame.

Minimal hardware is required because it is not computationally intensive.

== Standardisation ==
Unlike the video formats specified in international standards such as MPEG-2 and the format specified in the JPEG still-picture coding standard, there is no document that defines a single exact format that is universally recognized as a complete specification of “Motion JPEG” for use in all contexts. This raises compatibility concerns about file outputs from different manufacturers. However, each particular file format usually has some standard on how M-JPEG is encoded. For example, Microsoft documents their standard format to store M-JPEG in AVI files, Apple documents how M-JPEG is stored in QuickTime files, RFC 2435 describes how M-JPEG is implemented in an RTP stream, and an M-JPEG CodecID is planned for the Matroska file format.

== Applications ==
M-JPEG is now used by video-capture devices such as digital cameras, IP cameras, and webcams, as well as by non-linear video editing systems. It is natively supported by the QuickTime Player, the PlayStation console, and web browsers such as Safari, Google Chrome, Mozilla Firefox and Microsoft Edge.

=== Video editing ===
M-JPEG is frequently used in non-linear video editing systems. Modern desktop CPUs are powerful enough to work with high-definition video, so no special hardware is required, and they in turn offer native random-access to any frame.

=== Game consoles ===
The PlayStation game console integrated M-JPEG like decompression hardware for in-game FMV sequences, while the PlayStation Portable handheld game console can play M-JPEG from the Memory Stick Pro Duo under the .avi extension with a resolution of 480×272. Both can record clips in M-JPEG with its Go!Cam camera.

Nintendo's Wii game console, as well as VTech's InnoTab, can play M-JPEG-encoded videos on SD card using its Photo Channel. The SanDisk Sansa e200 and the Zen V digital audio players play short M-JPEG videos. Recent firmware updates to the Nintendo 3DS can now record and play "3D-AVI" M-JPEG-encoded files, which is the same format used in the Fujifilm FinePix Real 3D series, from a SD card in 320×240 resolution so long as the video duration is 10 minutes or less.

=== Digital cameras ===
Prior to the rise in MPEG-4 encoding in consumer devices, a progressive scan form of M-JPEG saw widespread use in the “movie” modes of digital still cameras, allowing video encoding and playback through the integrated JPEG compression hardware with only a software modification. The resultant quality is still inferior compared to a similar-sized MPEG, particularly as the sound (when included) was uncompressed PCM and recorded at a low sample rate or low-compression, low processor-demand ADPCM.

To keep file sizes and transfer rates under control, frame sizes and rates, along with sound sampling rates, are kept relatively low with very high levels of compression for each individual frame. Resolutions of 160×120 or 320×240 are common sizes, typically at 10, 12 or 15 frames per second, with picture quality equivalent to a JPEG setting of “50” with mono ADPCM sound sampled at ~8 kHz. This results in a very basic, but serviceable video output at a similar storage cost to MPEG (~120 kB/s video rate, ~8 kB/s audio – or approx 1 Mbit/s at 320×240 resolution), but with minimal processing overheads. This video is typically stored in Microsoft's AVI or Apple's QuickTime Movie container files. These files are viewable natively on most operating systems, however sometimes an additional codec must be installed.

The AMV video format, common on cheap "MP4" players, is a modified version of M-JPEG.

In addition to portable players (which are mainly "consumers" of the video), many video-enabled digital cameras use M-JPEG for video-capture. For instance:

- In August 2008, Nikon announced the D90, the first D-SLR to record video. The format used is M-JPEG. The D90 uses three different motion JPEG formats: 320×216 pixels, 640×424 pixels and 1280×720 pixels.
- In June 2009, Pentax announced that the then-upcoming K-7 camera would use M-JPEG in resolutions 640×416, 1280×720, and 1536×1024. The data rate for the M-JPEG files created can be up to 74 Mbit/s.
- In August 2016, Canon announced that the 5D Mark IV camera would record 4K video in M-JPEG, with a data rate of approximately 500 Mbit/s.

A video that was recorded on a Canon 5D mark IV in DCI 4K using motion jpeg

Many network-enabled cameras provide M-JPEG streams that network clients can connect to. Mozilla and Webkit-based browsers have native support for viewing these M-JPEG streams.

Some network-enabled cameras provide their own M-JPEG interfaces as part of the normal feature set. For cameras that don't provide this feature natively, a server can be used to transcode the camera pictures into an M-JPEG stream and then provide that stream to other network clients.

=== Media players ===
Apple announced on September 1, 2010 that their newest version of the Apple TV would support M-JPEG up to 35 Mbit/s, 1280×720 pixels, 30 frames per second, audio in μlaw, PCM stereo audio in .avi file format.

Certain media players such as the Netgear NeoTV 550 do not support the playback of M-JPEG.

=== Video streaming ===
HTTP streaming separates each image into individual HTTP replies on a specified marker. HTTP streaming creates packets of a sequence of JPEG images that can be received by clients such as QuickTime or VLC.

In response to a GET request for a MJPEG file or stream, the server streams the sequence of JPEG frames over HTTP. A special mime-type content type multipart/x-mixed-replace;boundary=<boundary-name> informs the client to expect several parts (frames) as an answer delimited by <boundary-name>. This boundary name is expressly disclosed within the MIME-type declaration itself. The TCP connection is not closed as long as the client wants to receive new frames and the server wants to provide new frames. Two basic implementations of a M-JPEG streaming server are cambozola and MJPG-Streamer. The more robust ffmpeg-server also provides M-JPEG streaming support.

Native web browser support includes: Safari, Google Chrome, Microsoft Edge and Firefox. Other browsers, such as Internet Explorer can display M-JPEG streams with the help of external plugins. Cambozola is an applet that can show M-JPEG streams in Java-enabled browsers. M-JPEG is also natively supported by PlayStation and QuickTime. Most commonly, M-JPEG is used in IP based security cameras.

== Successors ==
Technology improvements can be found in the designs of H.263v2 Annex I and MPEG-4 Part 2, that use frequency-domain prediction of transform coefficient values, and in H.264/MPEG-4 AVC, that use spatial prediction and adaptive transform block size techniques. There are also more sophisticated entropy coding than what was practical when the first JPEG design was developed. All of these new developments make M-JPEG an inefficient recording mechanism.

== See also ==
- APNG
- AV1
- Audio Video Interleave (.avi)
- AVIF
- Comparison of video container formats
- File extensions
- GIF
- Graphics editing program
- High Efficiency Image File Format, image container format for HEVC and other image coding formats
- JPEG XL
- Multiple-image Network Graphics
- Motion JPEG 2000
- QuickTime File Format
- WebP
