= Flexible organic light-emitting diode =

Type of computer monitor

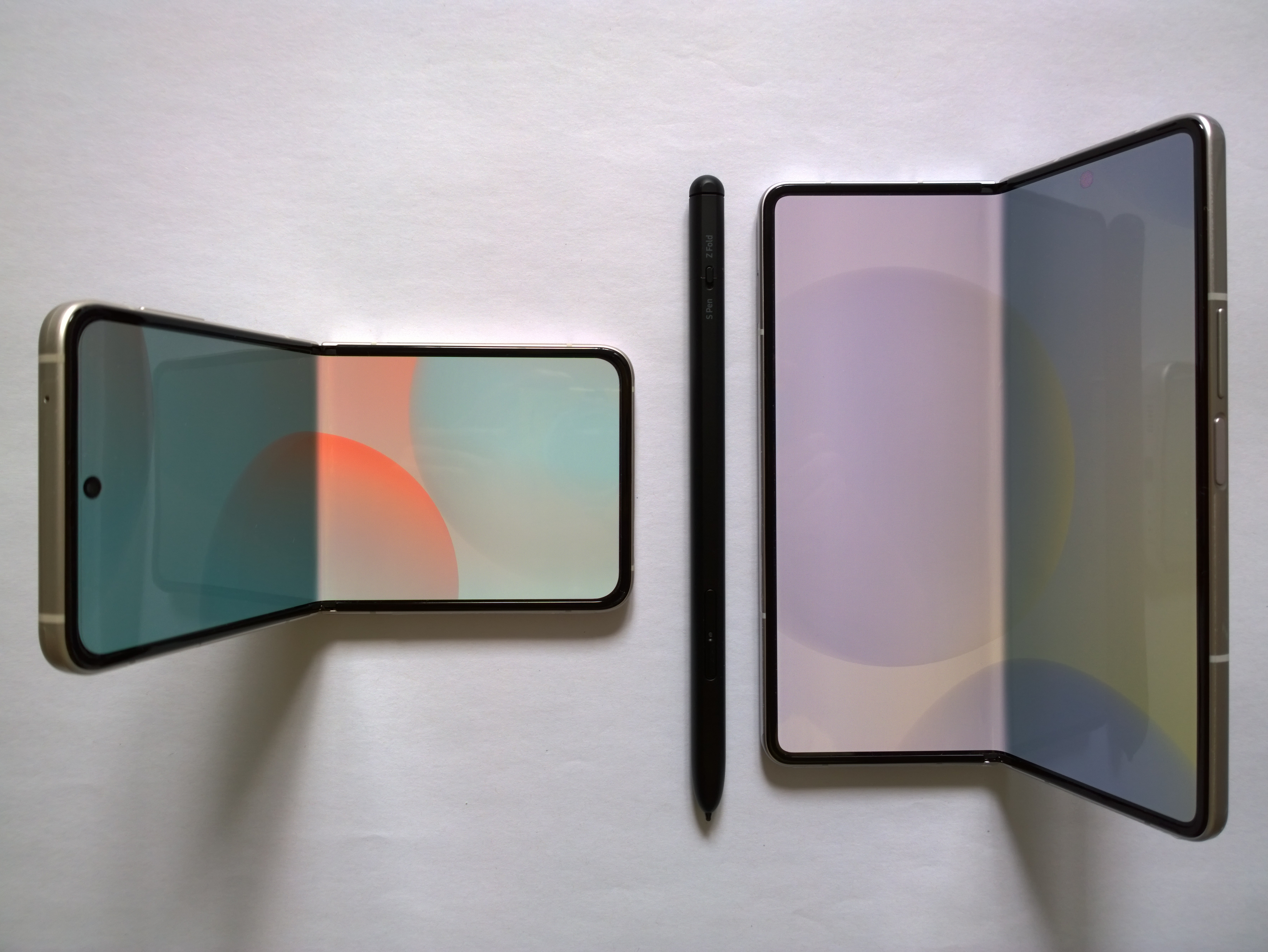
Flexible OLED displays on foldable smartphones

A flexible organic light-emitting diode (FOLED) is a type of organic light-emitting diode (OLED) incorporating a flexible plastic substrate on which the electroluminescent organic semiconductor is deposited. This enables the device to be bent or rolled while still operating. Currently the focus of research in industrial and academic groups, flexible OLEDs form one method of fabricating a rollable display.

== Technical details and applications ==
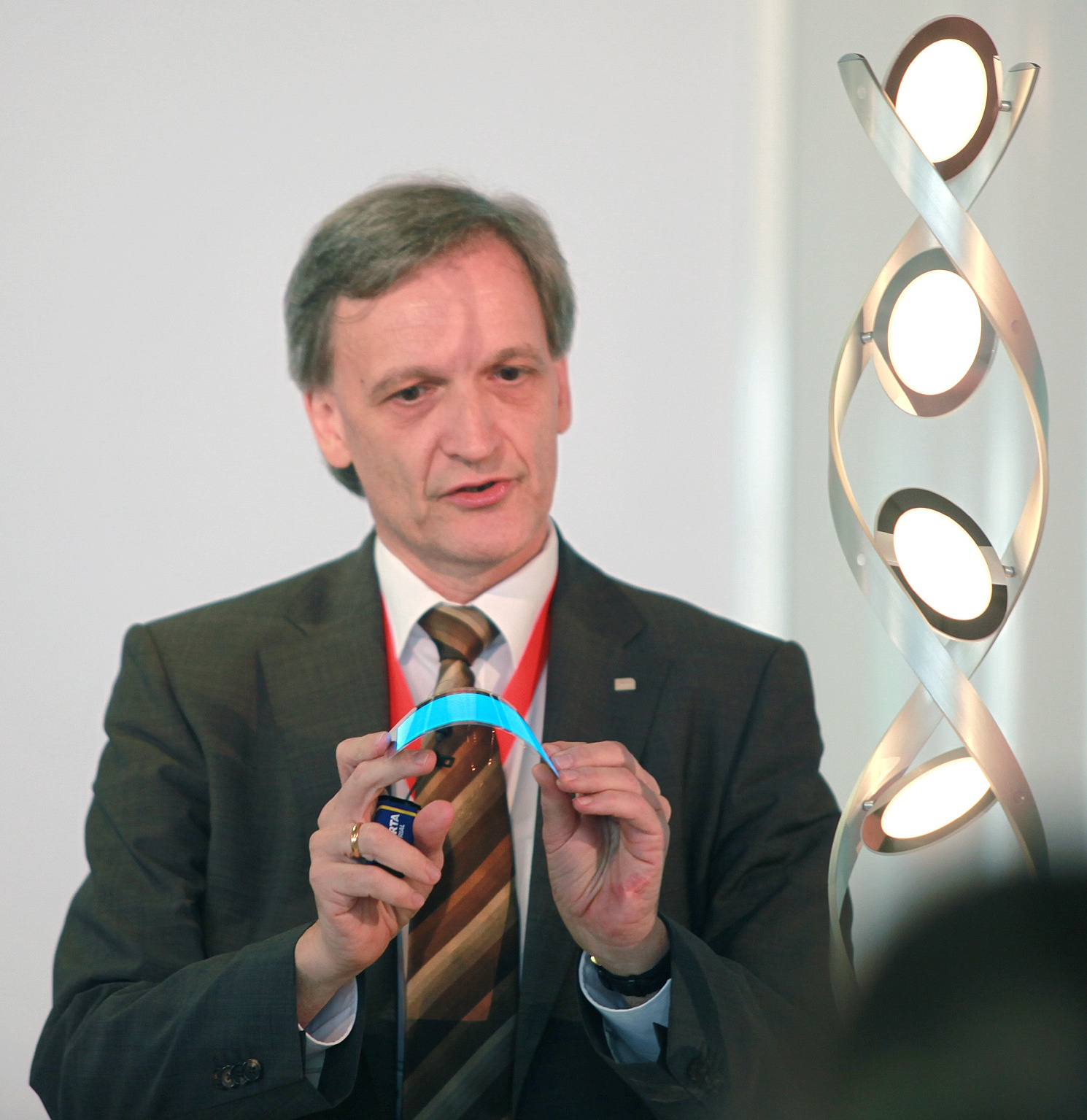
Demonstration of a battery-driven flexible OLED lamp from Merck KGaA

An OLED emits light due to the electroluminescence of thin films of organic semiconductors approximately 100 nm thick. Regular OLEDs are usually fabricated on a glass substrate, but by replacing glass with a flexible plastic such as polyethylene terephthalate (PET) among others, OLEDs can be made both bendable and lightweight.

Such materials may not be suitable for comparable devices based on inorganic semiconductors due to the need for lattice matching and the high temperature fabrication procedure involved.

In contrast, flexible OLED devices can be fabricated by deposition of the organic layer onto the substrate using a method derived from inkjet printing, allowing the inexpensive and roll-to-roll fabrication of printed electronics.

Flexible OLEDs may be used in the production of rollable displays, electronic paper, or bendable displays which can be integrated into clothing, wallpaper or other curved surfaces. Prototype displays have been exhibited by companies such as Sony, which are capable of being rolled around the width of a pencil.

== Disadvantages ==
Both flexible substrate itself as well as the process of bending the device introduce stress into the materials. There may be residual stress from the deposition of layers onto a flexible substrate, thermal stresses due to the different coefficient of thermal expansion of materials in the device, in addition to the external stress from the bending of the device.

Stress introduced into the organic layers may lower the efficiency or brightness of the device as it is deformed, or cause complete breakdown of the device altogether. Indium tin oxide (ITO), the material most commonly used as the transparent anode, is brittle. Fracture of the anode can occur which can increase the sheet resistance of the ITO or disrupt the layered structure of the OLED. Although ITO is the most common and best understood anode material used in OLEDs, research has been undertaken into alternative materials that are better suited for flexible applications including carbon nanotubes.

Encapsulation is another challenge for flexible OLED devices. The materials in an OLED are sensitive to air and moisture which lead to degradation of the materials themselves as well as quenching of excited states within the molecule. The common method of encapsulation for regular OLEDs is to seal the organic layer between glass. Flexible encapsulation methods are generally not as effective a barrier to air and moisture as glass, and current research aims to improve the encapsulation of flexible organic light emitting diodes.

== See also ==
- Flexible electronics
- Organic light-emitting diode
- Phosphorescent organic light-emitting diode
- Rollable display
