= Tris(8-hydroxyquinolinato)aluminium =

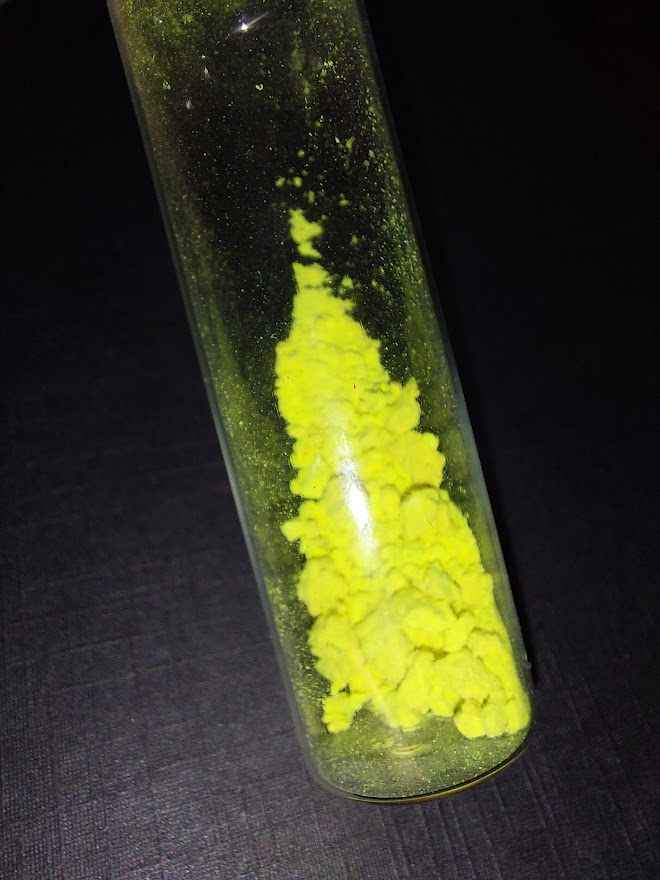
- Tris(8-hydroxyquinolinato)aluminium

Names
- IUPAC name Tris(8-hydroxyquinolinato)aluminium
- Other names 8-Hydroxyquinoline aluminium salt, Alq_{3}, aluminium 8-hydroxyquinolinate, aluminium oxinate,

Identifiers
CAS Number	2085-33-8
3D model (JSmol)	Interactive image
ChemSpider	21106485
ECHA InfoCard	100.016.570
EC Number	218-227-0
PubChem CID	16683111
UNII	6DP9L7516L
CompTox Dashboard (EPA)	DTXSID201027201
- InChI: InChI=1S/3C9H7NO.Al.9H/c3*11-8-5-1-3-7-4-2-6-10-9(7)8;;;;;;;;;;/h3*1-6,11H;;;;;;;;;;/p-3 Key: HLONXFDEFIQTRK-UHFFFAOYSA-K; InChI=1/3C9H7NO.Al.9H/c3*11-8-5-1-3-7-4-2-6-10-9(7)8;;;;;;;;;;/h3*1-6,11H;;;;;;;;;;/p-3/rC27H27AlN3O3/c1-7-19-10-4-16-29-25(19)22(13-1)32-28(29,30-17-5-11-20-8-2-14-23(33-28)26(20)30)31-18-6-12-21-9-3-15-24(34-28)27(21)31/h1-18H,28H9/q-3 Key: HLONXFDEFIQTRK-AOGCTXLYAD
- SMILES: c7ccc8cccc9O[Al-3]36(Oc2cccc1ccc[n+]3c12)(Oc5cccc4ccc[n+]6c45)[n+]7c89

Properties
Chemical formula	C_{27}H_{18}AlN_{3}O_{3}
Molar mass	459.43
Appearance	Yellow powder
Melting point	> 300 °C (572 °F; 573 K)
Solubility in water	insoluble in water

Hazards
- GHS labelling
Pictograms	(GHS07: Exclamation mark)
Signal word	Warning
Hazard statements	H315, H319, H335
Precautionary statements	P261, P264, P271, P280, P302+P352, P304+P340, P305+P351+P338, P312, P321, P332+P313, P337+P313, P362, P403+P233, P405, P501
- Except where otherwise noted, data are given for materials in their standard state (at 25 °C [77 °F], 100 kPa). verify (what is ?) Infobox references

Tris(8-hydroxyquinolinato)aluminium is the chemical compound with the formula Al(C_{9}H_{6}NO)_{3}. Widely abbreviated Alq_{3}, it is a coordination complex wherein aluminium is bonded in a bidentate manner to the conjugate base of three 8-hydroxyquinoline ligands.

== Structure ==
Both the meridional and facial isomers are known as well as several polymorphs (different crystalline forms).

Thermal ellipsoid model of mer-Alq_{3}	Thermal ellipsoid model of fac-Alq_{3}

== Synthesis ==
The compound is prepared by the reaction of 8-hydroxyquinoline with aluminium(III) sources

Al^{3+} + 3 C_{9}H_{7}NO → Al(C_{9}H_{6}NO)_{3} + 3 H^{+}

The synthesis and precipitation are so efficient that this reaction is used in gravimetric analysis for aluminium.

== Applications ==
Alq_{3} is a common component of organic light-emitting diodes (OLEDs). Variations in the substituents on the quinoline rings affect its luminescence properties.
