= Sony XEL-1 =

World's first OLED television, designed in 2007

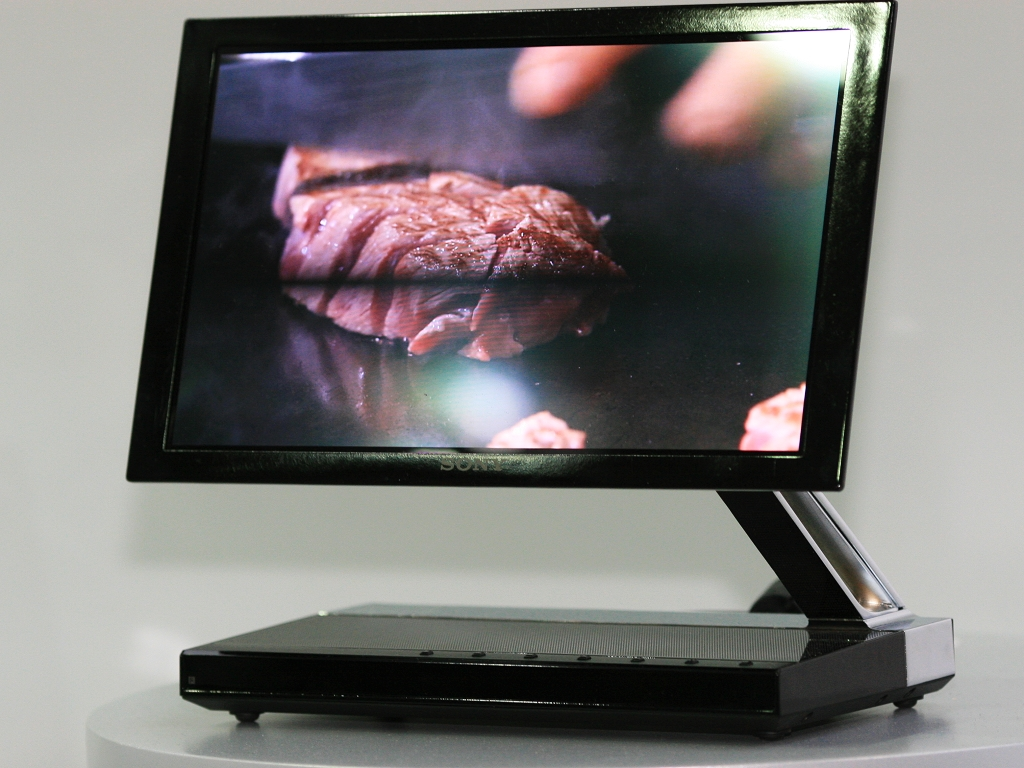
Sony XEL-1 (front)

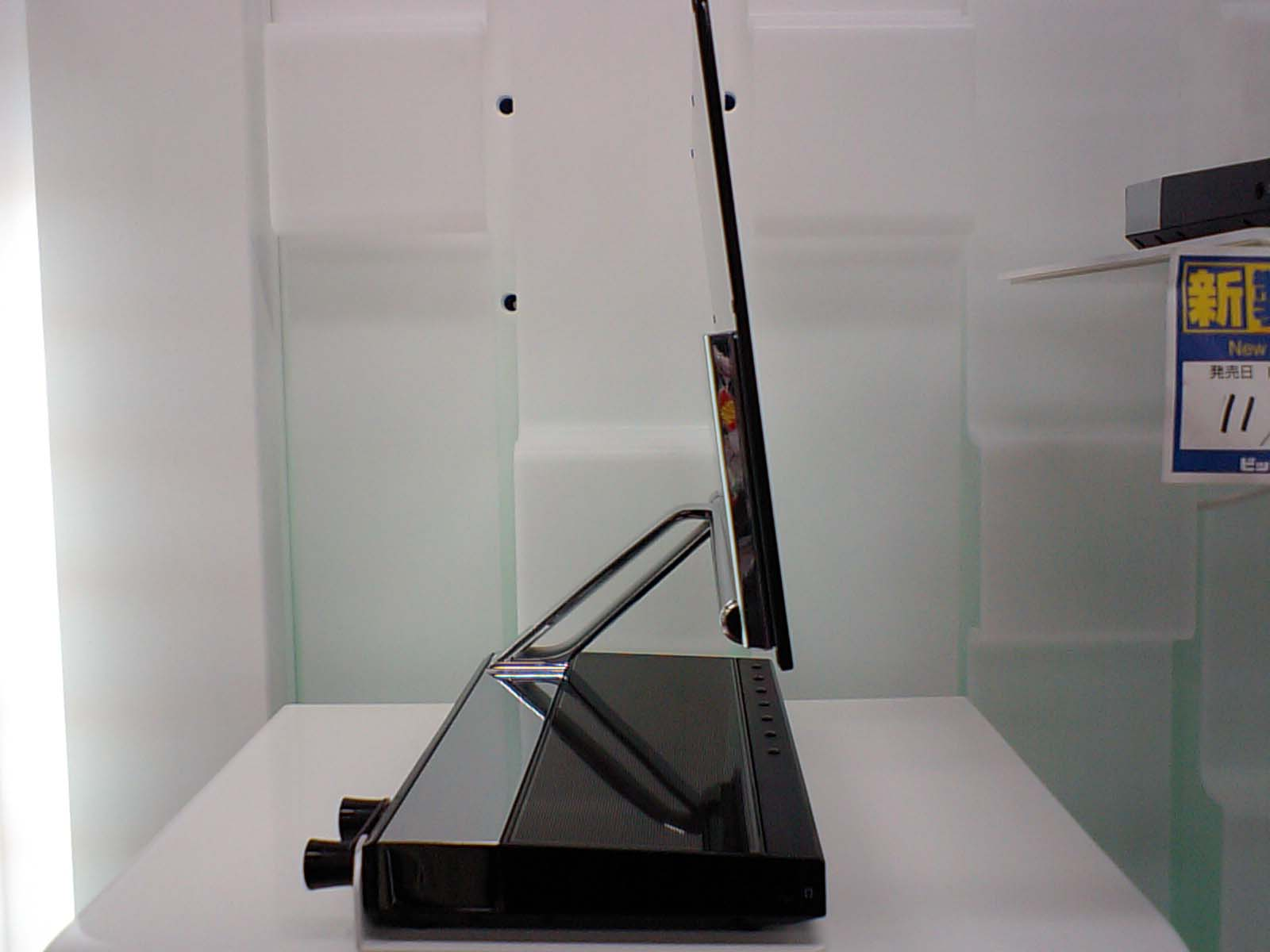
Sony XEL-1 (side)

The XEL-1 is the world's first organic light-emitting diode (OLED) television set, designed by Sony in 2007 and produced for sale the following year. It was also the world's thinnest television during its production, at 3 mm. It has a screen size of 11 inches with a native resolution 960×540. The top of the base has 2 speakers and the power, volume, channel, input, and menu buttons, which are backlit, so the symbols and abbreviations change when the XMB interface is accessed. The back of the panel has a DMeX service input, a 16-volt DC input, a VHF/UHF/cable input, a Memory Stick slot, and two HDMI inputs. On the left side of the panel there is an analog/digital audio output.

The XEL-1 has a contrast ratio of 1,000,000:1, high color saturation, large viewing angles, high screen uniformity, and low power consumption. On the other hand, it has poor primary color accuracy, a quarter of the full HD resolution (1920×1080), no anti-judder processing, a light-reflective screen, few inputs, a non-detachable panel, a small screen and a MSRP of US$2,499.99. It was sold in the United States, Canada, Russia, Japan, Europe and Australia. Years later in 2017, Sony officially sold their first large OLED TV in market, the BRAVIA OLED A1/A1E with 4K HDR.

== Specifications ==
=== General ===
- Aspect ratio: 16:9
- Screen size: 11 inches measured diagonally
- Television type: OLED flat panel
- Color: Black
- Auto SAP
- Closed Caption (CC): Yes
- ID-1 Detection: Yes
- Xross Media Bar
- Favorite Channel
- Weight: 11 pounds (5.0 kg)

=== Video ===
- Contrast ratio: 1,000,000:1
- Native resolution: 960 x 540
- Picture adjustment: Mode, Reset, Picture, Brightness, Color, Hue, Color Temperature, Sharpness, Noise Reduction, and MPEG Noise Reduction
- Advanced settings: Black Corrector, Gamma, Clear White, Color Space, and Live Color
- Tuner: NTSC, CATV, ATSC, and Clear QAM1
- Display technology: OLED
- Accepted video signals: 480i, 480p, 720p, 1080i/60, and 1080p/60
- CineMotion reverse 3:2 pulldown technology: Auto
- Comb filter: 3D digital
- Picture modes: Vivid, Standard, and Custom
- Wide mode: Wide Zoom, Normal, Full, and Zoom
- Light sensor
- Noise reduction

=== Audio ===
- Power output: 2W (2 x 1W)
- Sound effect: S-Force Front Surround
- Class D amplifier
- Steady Sound
- Sound Booster
- Dolby Digital: AC3 for ATSC
- MTS Stereo decoder
- A/V Synch
- Sound mode: Dynamic, Standard, and Custom

=== Inputs and outputs ===
- RF connector input: 1 (rear)
- Memory Stick media slot: Memory Stick PRO (not available for the UK model)
- Digital audio output (optical)
- Headphone output: 1 (side)
- HDMI connection inputs: 2 (rear), supports 1080p/60, CEC capable
- Ethernet jack (Japanese model only)

== Reception ==
The XEL-1 received a positive review from CNET, however, it also received mixed reviews from customers who bought it.
