= OLED =

Diode that emits light from an organic compound

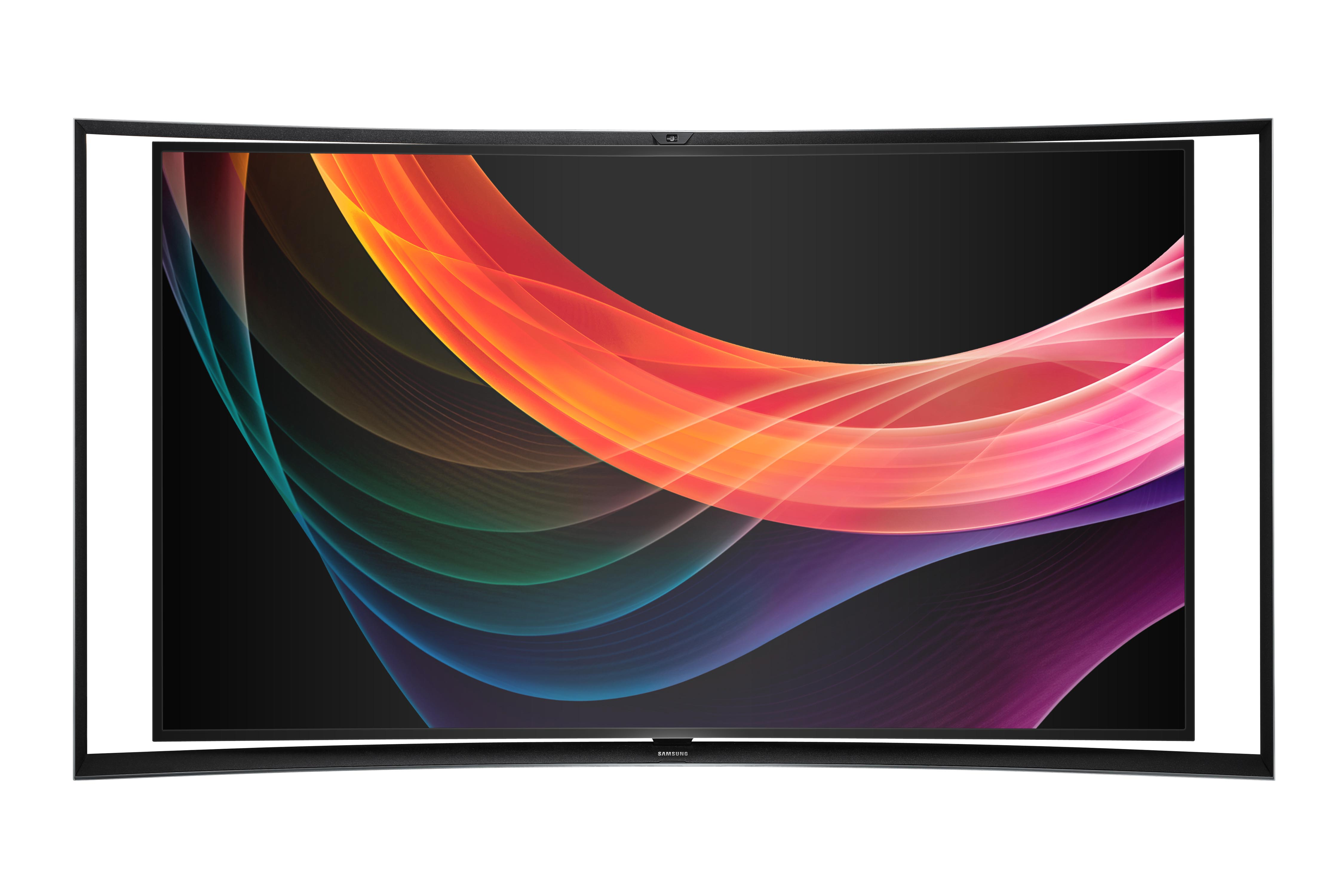
An OLED television

An organic light-emitting diode (OLED), also known as organic electroluminescent (organic EL) diode, is a type of light-emitting diode (LED) in which the emissive electroluminescent layer is an organic compound film that emits light in response to an electric current. This organic layer is situated between two electrodes; typically, at least one of these electrodes is transparent. OLEDs are used to create digital displays in devices such as television screens, computer monitors, and portable systems such as smartphones and handheld game consoles; its significant advantage over liquid-crystal displays (LCD) is that the individual pixels emit their own light, requiring no backlight like LED-lit LCDs.

OLEDs are fundamentally different from LEDs and do not employ a crystalline structure. There are two main families of OLED: those based on small molecules and those employing polymers. Adding mobile ions to an OLED creates a light-emitting electrochemical cell (LEC) which has a slightly different mode of operation. An OLED display matrix can have various control schemes:

1. A passive-matrix (PMOLED) where each row and line in the display is controlled sequentially, one by one
2. Active-matrix (AMOLED) that uses a thin-film transistor (TFT) backplane to directly access and switch each individual pixel on or off, allowing for higher resolution and larger display sizes.

The invention of OLED can be attributed to two chemists at Eastman Kodak in 1987, namely Ching Wan Tang and Steven Van Slyke. Its public commercial use began with a car stereo in 1997 by Pioneer and for more than a decade its use was mainly for small monochrome displays in-car or portable systems, although the first full-color OLED display was implemented in a Kodak digicam in 2003. OLED displays took off during the latter half of the 2010s and have since been implemented mainly in wearable devices, smartphones, and high-end televisions.

== History ==
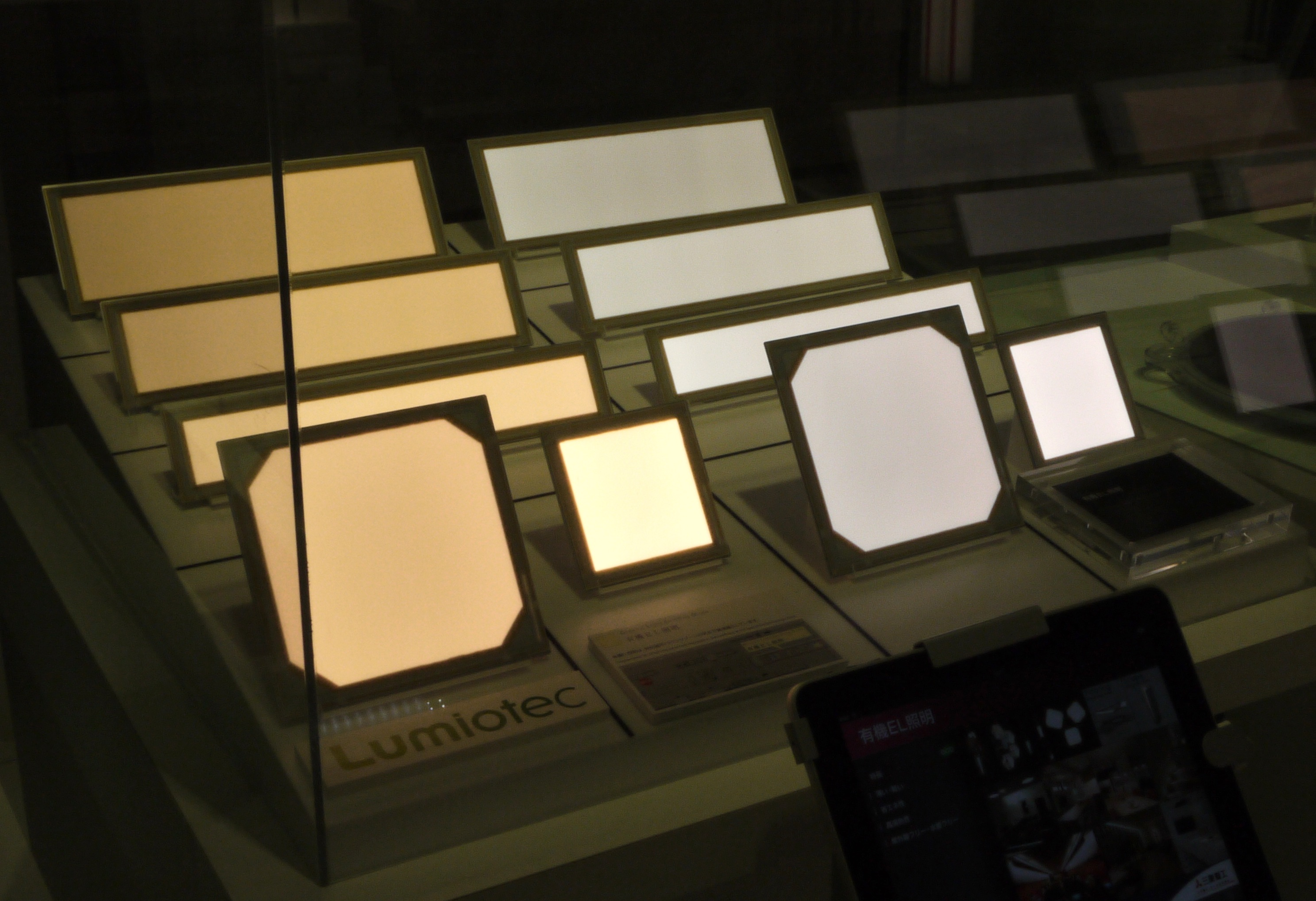
Prototype OLED panels

André Bernanose and co-workers at the Nancy-Université made the first observations of electroluminescence in organic materials, in the early 1950s. They applied high alternating voltages in air to materials such as acridine orange dye, either deposited on or dissolved in cellulose or cellophane thin films. The proposed mechanism was either direct excitation of the dye molecules or excitation of electrons.

In 1960, Martin Pope and co-workers at New York University developed ohmic dark-injecting electrode contacts to organic crystals. They further described the necessary energetic requirements (work functions) for hole and electron injecting electrode contacts. These contacts are the basis of charge injection in all modern OLED devices. Pope's group also first observed direct current (DC) electroluminescence under vacuum on a single pure crystal of anthracene and on anthracene crystals doped with tetracene in 1963 using a small area silver electrode at 400 volts. The proposed mechanism was field-accelerated electron excitation of molecular fluorescence.

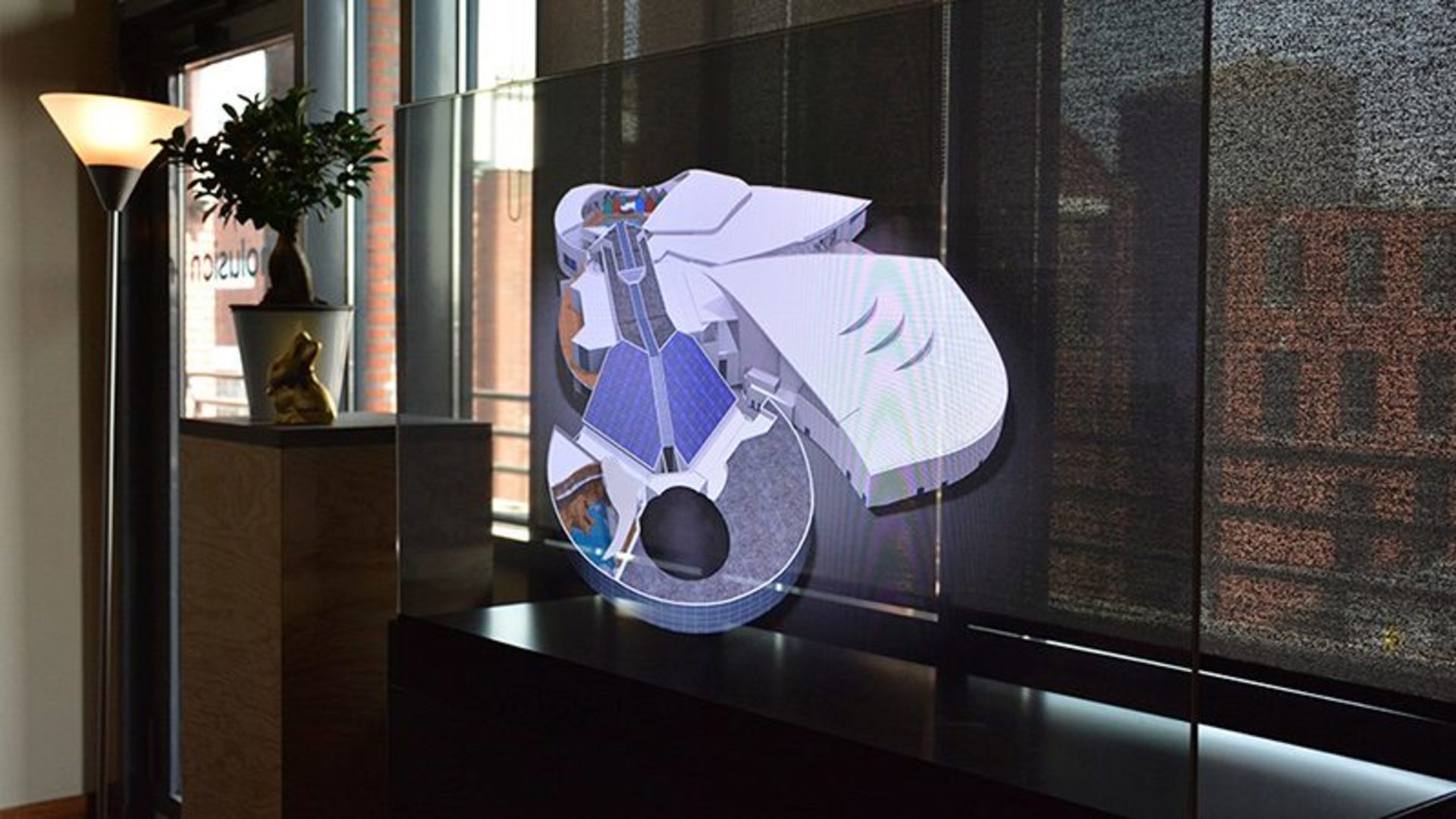
Transparent 55" OLED screen

Pope's group reported in 1965 that in the absence of an external electric field, the electroluminescence in anthracene crystals is caused by the recombination of a thermalized electron and hole, and that the conducting level of anthracene is higher in energy than the exciton energy level. Also in 1965, Wolfgang Helfrich and W. G. Schneider of the National Research Council in Canada produced double injection recombination electroluminescence for the first time in an anthracene single crystal using hole and electron injecting electrodes, the forerunner of modern double-injection devices. In the same year, Dow Chemical researchers patented a method of preparing electroluminescent cells using high-voltage (500–1500 V) AC-driven (100–3000 Hz) electrically insulated one millimetre thin layers of a melted phosphor consisting of ground anthracene powder, tetracene, and graphite powder. Their proposed mechanism involved electronic excitation at the contacts between the graphite particles and the anthracene molecules.

The first Polymer LED (PLED) to be created was by Roger Partridge at the National Physical Laboratory in the United Kingdom. It used a film of polyvinylcarbazole up to 2.2 micrometers thick located between two charge-injecting electrodes. The light generated was readily visible in normal lighting conditions though the polymer used had 2 limitations; low conductivity and the difficulty of injecting electrons. Later development of conjugated polymers would allow others to largely eliminate these problems. His contribution has often been overlooked due to the secrecy NPL imposed on the project. When it was patented in 1974 it was given a deliberately obscure "catch all" name while the government's Department for Industry tried and failed to find industrial collaborators to fund further development.

=== Practical OLEDs ===
Chemists Ching Wan Tang and Steven Van Slyke at Eastman Kodak built the first practical OLED device in 1987. This device used a two-layer structure with separate hole transporting and electron transporting layers such that recombination and light emission occurred in the middle of the organic layer; this resulted in a reduction in operating voltage and improvements in efficiency.

Research into polymer electroluminescence culminated in 1990, with J. H. Burroughes at the Cavendish Laboratory at Cambridge University, UK, reporting a high-efficiency green light-emitting polymer-based device using 100 nm thick films of poly(p-phenylene vinylene). Moving from molecular to macromolecular materials solved the problems previously encountered with the long-term stability of the organic films and enabled high-quality films to be easily made. Subsequent research developed multilayer polymers and the new field of plastic electronics and OLED research and device production grew rapidly. White OLEDs, pioneered by J. Kido et al. at Yamagata University, Japan in 1995, achieved the commercialization of OLED-backlit displays and lighting.

In 1999, Kodak and Sanyo had entered into a partnership to jointly research, develop, and produce OLED displays. They announced the world's first 2.4-inch active-matrix, full-color OLED display in September the same year. In September 2002, they presented a prototype of 15-inch HDTV format display based on white OLEDs with color filters at the CEATEC Japan.

Manufacturing of small molecule OLEDs was started in 1997 by Pioneer Corporation, followed by TDK in 2001 and Samsung-NEC Mobile Display (SNMD), which later became one of the world's largest OLED display manufacturers - Samsung Display, in 2002.

The Sony XEL-1, released in 2007, was the first OLED television. Universal Display Corporation, one of the OLED materials companies, holds a number of patents concerning the commercialization of OLEDs that are used by major OLED manufacturers around the world.

On 5 December 2017, JOLED, the successor of Sony and Panasonic's printable OLED business units, began the world's first commercial shipment of inkjet-printed OLED panels.

== Working principle ==
Schematic of a bilayer OLED: 1. Cathode (−), 2. Emissive Layer, 3. Emission of radiation, 4. Conductive layer, 5. Anode (+)

A typical OLED is composed of a layer of organic materials situated between two electrodes, the anode and cathode, all deposited on a substrate. The organic molecules are electrically conductive as a result of delocalization of pi electrons caused by conjugation over part or all of the molecule. These materials have conductivity levels ranging from insulators to conductors, and are therefore considered organic semiconductors. The highest occupied and lowest unoccupied molecular orbitals (HOMO and LUMO) of organic semiconductors are analogous to the valence and conduction bands of inorganic semiconductors.

Originally, the most basic polymer OLEDs consisted of a single organic layer. One example was the first light-emitting device synthesised by J. H. Burroughes et al., which involved a single layer of poly(p-phenylene vinylene). However, multilayer/tandem OLEDs can be fabricated with two or more layers to improve device efficiency and charge balance. As well as conductive properties, different materials may be chosen to aid charge injection at electrodes by providing a more gradual electronic profile, or block a charge from reaching the opposite electrode and being wasted. Many modern OLEDs incorporate a simple bilayer structure, consisting of a conductive layer and an emissive layer.

In 2011 typical OLED’s improved quantum efficiency (up to 19%) by using a graded heterojunction architecture, where the composition of hole and electron-transport materials varies continuously within the emissive layer with a dopant emitter. The graded heterojunction architecture combines the benefits of both conventional architectures by improving charge injection while simultaneously balancing charge transport within the emissive region.

During operation, a voltage is applied across the OLED such that the anode is positive with respect to the cathode. Anodes are picked based upon the quality of their optical transparency, electrical conductivity, and chemical stability. A current of electrons flows through the device from cathode to anode, as electrons are injected into the LUMO of the organic layer at the cathode and withdrawn from the HOMO at the anode. This latter process may also be described as the injection of electron holes into the HOMO. Electrostatic forces bring the electrons and the holes towards each other and they recombine forming an exciton, a bound state of the electron and hole. This happens closer to the electron-transport layer part of the emissive layer, because in organic semiconductors holes are generally more mobile than electrons. The decay of this excited state results in a relaxation of the energy levels of the electron, accompanied by emission of radiation whose frequency is in the visible region. The frequency of this radiation depends on the band gap of the material, in this case the difference in energy between the HOMO and LUMO.

As electrons and holes are fermions with half integer spin, an exciton may either be in a singlet state or a triplet state depending on how the spins of the electron and hole have been combined. Statistically three triplet excitons will be formed for each singlet exciton. Decay from triplet states (phosphorescence) is spin forbidden, increasing the timescale of the transition and limiting the internal efficiency of fluorescent OLED emissive layers and devices. Phosphorescent organic light-emitting diodes (PHOLEDs) or emissive layers make use of spin–orbit interactions to facilitate intersystem crossing between singlet and triplet states, thus obtaining emission from both singlet and triplet states and improving the internal efficiency.

Indium tin oxide (ITO) is commonly used as the anode material. It is transparent to visible light and has a high work function which promotes injection of holes into the HOMO level of the organic layer. A second conductive (injection) layer is typically added, which may consist of PEDOT:PSS, as the HOMO level of this material generally lies between the work function of ITO and the HOMO of other commonly used polymers, reducing the energy barriers for hole injection. Metals such as barium and calcium are often used for the cathode as they have low work functions which promote injection of electrons into the LUMO of the organic layer. Such metals are reactive, so they require a capping layer of aluminium to avoid degradation. Two secondary benefits of the aluminum capping layer include robustness to electrical contacts and the back reflection of emitted light out to the transparent ITO layer.

Experimental research has proven that the properties of the anode, specifically the anode/hole transport layer (HTL) interface topography plays a major role in the efficiency, performance, and lifetime of organic light-emitting diodes. Imperfections in the surface of the anode decrease anode-organic film interface adhesion, increase electrical resistance, and allow for more frequent formation of non-emissive dark spots in the OLED material adversely affecting lifetime. Mechanisms to decrease anode roughness for ITO/glass substrates include the use of thin films and self-assembled monolayers. Also, alternative substrates and anode materials are being considered to increase OLED performance and lifetime. Possible examples include single crystal sapphire substrates treated with gold (Au) film anodes yielding lower work functions, operating voltages, electrical resistance values, and increasing lifetime of OLEDs.

Single carrier devices are typically used to study the kinetics and charge transport mechanisms of an organic material and can be useful when trying to study energy transfer processes. As current through the device is composed of only one type of charge carrier, either electrons or holes, recombination does not occur and no light is emitted. For example, electron only devices can be obtained by replacing ITO with a lower work function metal which increases the energy barrier of hole injection. Similarly, hole only devices can be made by using a cathode made solely of aluminium, resulting in an energy barrier too large for efficient electron injection.

== Carrier balance ==
Balanced charge injection and transfer are required to get high internal efficiency, pure emission of luminance layer without contaminated emission from charge transporting layers, and high stability. A common way to balance charge is optimizing the thickness of the charge transporting layers but is hard to control. Another way is using the exciplex. Exciplex formed between hole-transporting (p-type) and electron-transporting (n-type) side chains to localize electron-hole pairs. Energy is then transferred to luminophore and provide high efficiency. An example of using exciplex is grafting Oxadiazole and carbazole side units in red diketopyrrolopyrrole-doped Copolymer main chain shows improved external quantum efficiency and color purity in no optimized OLED.

== Material technologies ==
=== Small molecules ===
Alq_{3}, commonly used in small molecule OLEDs

Organic small-molecule electroluminescent materials have advantages of a wide variety, purification ease, and acceptance to strong chemical modifications. In order to make the luminescent materials to emit light at the desired color, a small amount of chromophores or unsaturated groups such as alkene bonds and benzene rings will usually be introduced in the molecular structure to change the size of the conjugation range of the material, so that the photophysical properties of the material changes. In general, the larger the range of π-electron conjugation system, the longer the wavelength of light emitted by the material. For instance, with the increase of the number of benzene rings, the fluorescence emission peak of benzene, naphthalene, anthracene, and tetracene is gradually red-shifted from 283 nm to 480 nm.

Common organic small molecule electroluminescent materials include aluminum complexes, anthracenes, biphenyl acetylene aryl derivatives, coumarin derivatives, and various fluorochromes. Efficient OLEDs using small molecules were first developed by Ching W. Tang et al. at Eastman Kodak. The term OLED traditionally refers specifically to this type of device, though the term SM-OLED is also in use.

Molecules commonly used as hosts in OLEDs include organometallic chelates (for example Alq_{3}, used in the organic light-emitting device reported by Tang et al.), fluorescent and phosphorescent dyes and conjugated dendrimers. Alq_{3} has been used as a green light emitter, electron transport material and as a host for yellow light and red light emitting dyes. PbBi and 1,3,5-oxadiazines (NON) can be used as a host for blue light emitters with quantum efficiency up to 21%. 8-Hydroxyquinolinolato-lithium and LiF can be used as a blue-green emitter.

Various material layers can be used to improve charge transport properties, for example triphenylamine and derivatives are commonly used as materials for hole transport layers. Fluorescent dyes can be chosen to obtain light emission at different wavelengths, and compounds such as perylene, rubrene and quinacridone derivatives are often used.

Because of the structural flexibility of small-molecule electroluminescent materials, thin films can be prepared by vacuum vapor deposition, which is more expensive and of limited use for large-area devices. The vacuum coating system, however, can make the entire process from film growth to OLED device preparation in a controlled and complete operating environment, helping to obtain uniform and stable films, thus ensuring the final fabrication of high-performance OLED devices.However, small molecule organic dyes are prone to fluorescence quenching in the solid state, resulting in lower luminescence efficiency. The doped OLED devices are also prone to crystallization, which reduces the luminescence and efficiency of the devices. Therefore, the development of devices based on small-molecule electroluminescent materials is limited by high manufacturing costs, poor stability, short life, and other shortcomings. Coherent emission from a laser dye-doped tandem SM-OLED device, excited in the pulsed regime, has been demonstrated. The emission is nearly diffraction limited with a spectral width similar to that of broadband dye lasers.

Researchers report luminescence from a single polymer molecule, representing the smallest possible organic light-emitting diode (OLED) device. Scientists will be able to optimize substances to produce more powerful light emissions. Finally, this work is a first step towards making molecule-sized components that combine electronic and optical properties. Similar components could form the basis of a molecular computer.

=== Polymer light-emitting diodes ===
poly(p-phenylene vinylene), used in the first PLED

Polymer light-emitting diodes (PLED, P-OLED), also light-emitting polymers (LEP), involve an electroluminescent conductive polymer that emits light when connected to an external voltage. They are used as a thin film for full-spectrum colour displays. Polymer OLEDs are quite efficient and require a relatively small amount of power for the amount of light produced.

Vacuum deposition is not a suitable method for forming thin films of polymers. If the polymeric OLED films are made by vacuum vapor deposition, the chain elements will be cut off and the original photophysical properties will be compromised. However, polymers can be processed in solution, and spin coating is a common method of depositing thin polymer films. This method is more suited to forming large-area films than thermal evaporation. No vacuum is required, and the emissive materials can also be applied on the substrate by a technique derived from commercial inkjet printing. However, as the application of subsequent layers tends to dissolve those already present, formation of multilayer structures is difficult with these methods. The metal cathode may still need to be deposited by thermal evaporation in vacuum. An alternative method to vacuum deposition is to deposit a Langmuir-Blodgett film.

Typical polymers used in PLED displays include derivatives of poly(p-phenylene vinylene) and polyfluorene. Substitution of side chains onto the polymer backbone may determine the colour of emitted light or the stability and solubility of the polymer for performance and ease of processing. While unsubstituted poly(p-phenylene vinylene) (PPV) is typically insoluble, a number of PPVs and related poly(naphthalene vinylene)s (PNVs) that are soluble in organic solvents or water have been prepared via ring opening metathesis polymerization. These water-soluble polymers or conjugated poly electrolytes (CPEs) also can be used as hole injection layers alone or in combination with nanoparticles like graphene.

=== Comparing OLED with other light displays ===
OLEDs are different than LCDs, as LCDs can not emit their own light. OLEDs use organic compounds to emit light when in the presence of an electrical current, as stated above, but LCDs are backlit and their liquid crystal displays change their configuration based on the electric current applied, and the colors appear through the polarization of that light. LEDs are different than the OLEDs as they also do not emit their own light, as they are backlit similar to LCDs, but also have semiconducting layers with "holes" for the electrons to go into when the electric current is applied. OLEDs can also be compared to Quantum Dot Light Emitting Diodes (QDLED), which can use aspects of OLEDs, but are color converters that are used to express colors in a different way, but can also be used with LCD systems, or LED systems.

OLEDs are fundamentally different from LEDs, which are based on a p–n diode crystalline solid structure. In LEDs, doping is used to create p- and n-regions by changing the conductivity of the host semiconductor. OLEDs do not employ a crystalline p-n structure. Doping of OLEDs is used to increase radiative efficiency by direct modification of the quantum-mechanical optical recombination rate. Doping is additionally used to determine the wavelength of photon emission.

=== Phosphorescent materials ===
Ir(mppy)_{3}, a phosphorescent dopant which emits green light

Phosphorescent organic light-emitting diodes use the principle of electrophosphorescence to convert electrical energy in an OLED into light in a highly efficient manner, with the internal quantum efficiencies of such devices approaching 100%. PHOLEDs can be deposited using vacuum deposition through a shadow mask.

Typically, a polymer such as poly(N-vinylcarbazole) is used as a host material to which an organometallic complex is added as a dopant. Iridium complexes such as Ir(mppy)_{3} as of 2004 were a focus of research, although complexes based on other heavy metals such as platinum have also been used.

The heavy metal atom at the centre of these complexes exhibits strong spin-orbit coupling, facilitating intersystem crossing between singlet and triplet states. By using these phosphorescent materials, both singlet and triplet excitons will be able to decay radiatively, hence improving the internal quantum efficiency of the device compared to a standard OLED where only the singlet states will contribute to emission of light.

Applications of OLEDs in solid state lighting require the achievement of high brightness with good CIE coordinates (for white emission). The use of macromolecular species like polyhedral oligomeric silsesquioxanes (POSS) in conjunction with the use of phosphorescent species such as Ir for printed OLEDs have exhibited brightnesses as high as 10,000 cd/m^{2}.

== Device architectures ==
=== Structure ===
==== Bottom emission ====
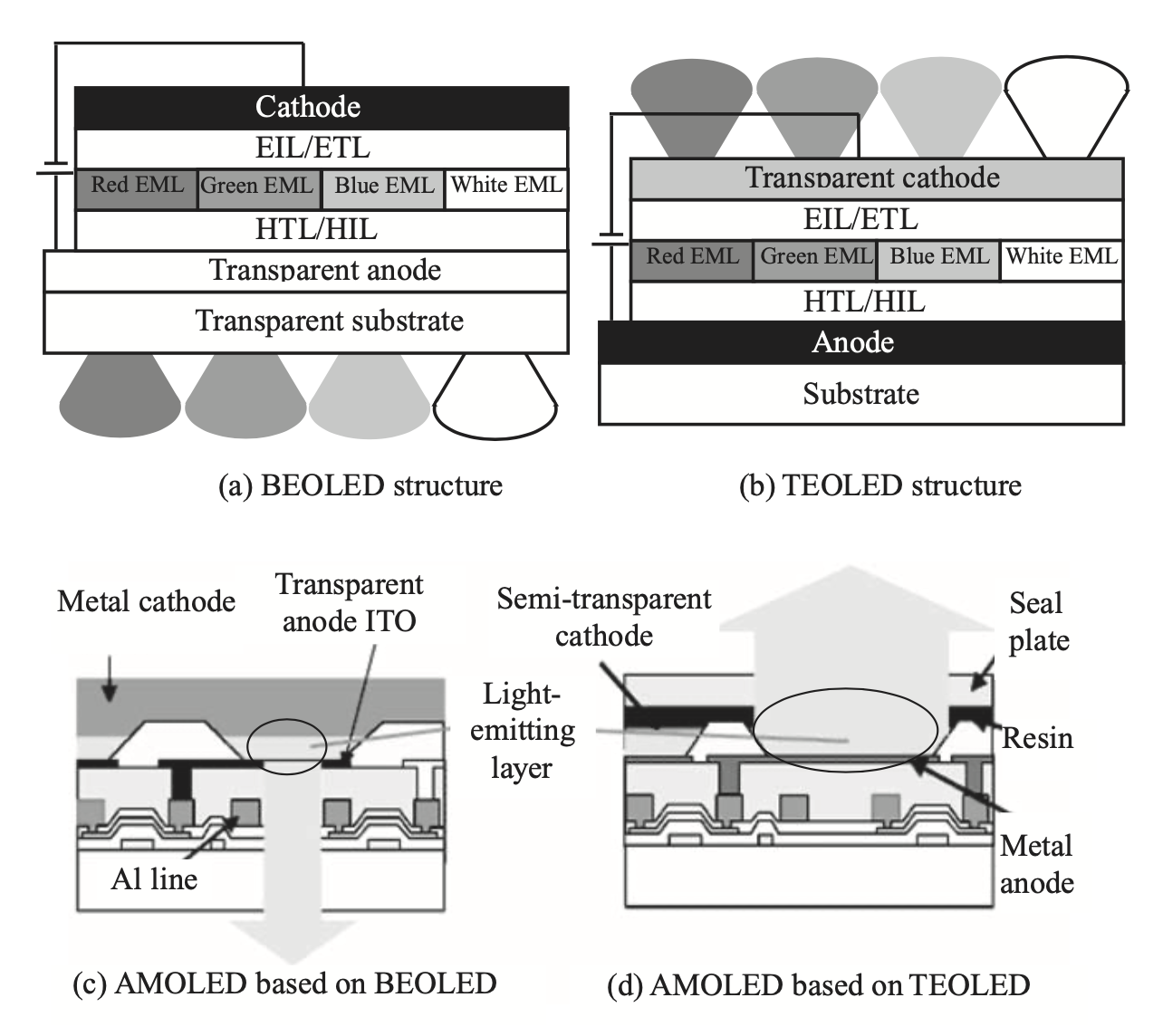
a) Bottom-emitting and b) top-emitting OLED structures; c,d) Schematic diagrams based on bottom-emitting and top-emitting OLEDs with low and high contrast ratio, respectively.

The bottom-emission organic light-emitting diode (BE-OLED) is the architecture that was used in the early-stage AMOLED displays. It had a transparent anode fabricated on a glass substrate, and a shiny reflective cathode. Light is emitted from the transparent anode direction. To reflect all the light towards the anode direction, a relatively thick metal cathode such as aluminum is used. For the anode, high-transparency indium tin oxide (ITO) was a typical choice to emit as much light as possible. Organic thin-films, including the emissive layer that actually generates the light, are then sandwiched between the ITO anode and the reflective metal cathode. The downside of bottom emission structure is that the light has to travel through the pixel drive circuits such as the thin-film transistor (TFT) substrate, and the area from which light can be extracted is limited and the light emission efficiency is reduced.

==== Top emission ====
An alternative configuration is to switch the mode of emission. A reflective anode, and a transparent (or more often semi-transparent) cathode are used so that the light emits from the cathode side, and this configuration is called top-emission OLED (TE-OLED). Unlike BEOLEDs where the anode is made of transparent conductive ITO, this time the cathode needs to be transparent, and the ITO material is not an ideal choice for the cathode because of a damage issue due to the sputtering process. Thus, a thin metal film such as pure Ag and the Mg:Ag alloy are used for the semi-transparent cathode due to their high transmittance and high conductivity. In contrast to the bottom emission, light is extracted from the opposite side in top emission without the need of passing through multiple drive circuit layers. Thus, the light generated can be extracted more efficiently.

Modern architectures employ separate cathode, N-doped EIL (electron injection layer), then ETL (electron transport layer), Doped EML (doped emissive layer), then HTL (hole transport layer), then P-doped HIL (hole injection layer) and then an anode. There can be several light emission layers in what is known as stacked OLED, and there can be a light extraction layer on the oled device, and then another one outside the oled device glass through which light exits with light extraction film made of microlenses.

=== Improvements ===
==== Deuterium ====
Using deuterium instead of hydrogen, in other words deuterated compounds, in red light, green light, blue light and white light OLED light emitting material layers and other layers nearby in OLED displays can improve their brightness by up to 30%. This is achieved by improving the current handling capacity, and lifespan of these materials.

==== Micro Lens Array (MLA) ====
Making indentations shaped like lenses on a transparent layer through which light passes from an OLED light emitting material, reduces the amount of scattered light within the display and directs it forward, improving brightness.

==== Micro-cavity theory ====
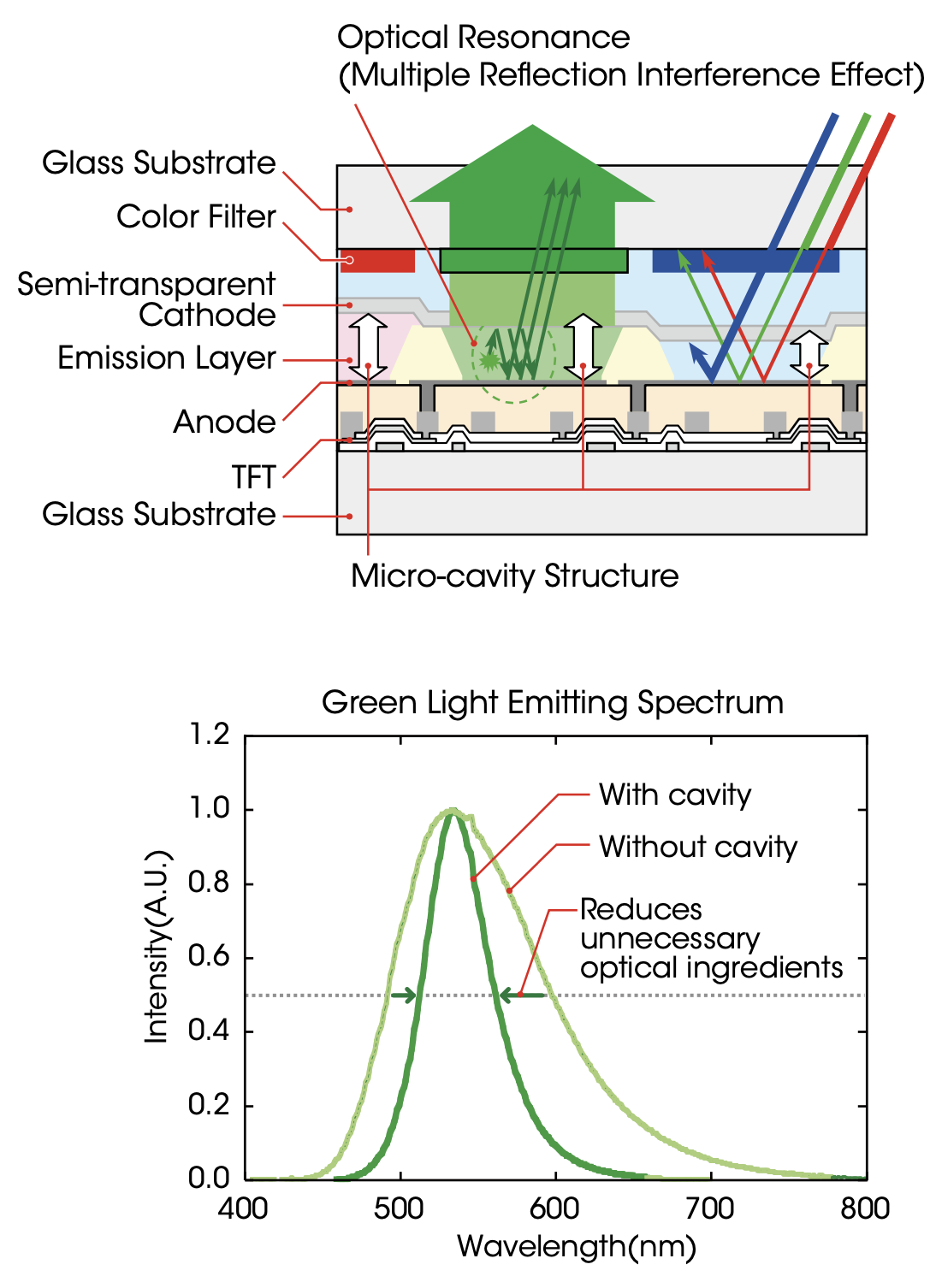
Sony's Super Top Emission OLED technology enhances the color purity of emitted lights.

When light waves meet while traveling along the same medium, wave interference occurs. This interference can be constructive or destructive. It is sometimes desirable for several waves of the same frequency to sum up into a wave with higher amplitudes.

Since both electrodes are reflective in TEOLED, light reflections can happen within the diode, and they cause more complex interferences than those in BEOLEDs. In addition to the two-beam interference, there exists a multi-resonance interference between two electrodes. Because the structure of TEOLEDs is similar to that of the Fabry-Perot resonator or laser resonator, which contains two parallel mirrors comparable to the two reflective electrodes), this effect is especially strong in TEOLED. This two-beam interference and the Fabry-Perot interferences are the main factors in determining the output spectral intensity of OLED. This optical effect is called the "micro-cavity effect."

In the case of OLED, that means the cavity in a TEOLED could be especially designed to enhance the light output intensity and color purity with a narrow band of wavelengths, without consuming more power. In TEOLEDs, the microcavity effect commonly occurs, and when and how to restrain or make use of this effect is indispensable for device design. To match the conditions of constructive interference, different layer thicknesses are applied according to the resonance wavelength of that specific color. The thickness conditions are carefully designed and engineered according to the peak resonance emitting wavelengths of the blue light (460 nm), green light (530 nm), and red light (610 nm) color LEDs. This technology greatly improves the light-emission efficiency of OLEDs, and are able to achieve a wider color gamut due to high color purity.

==== Color filters ====
In "white + color filter method", also known as WOLED, red, green, and blue emissions are obtained from the same white-light LEDs using different color filters. With this method, the OLED materials produce white light, which is then filtered to obtain the desired RGB colors. This method eliminated the need to deposit three different organic emissive materials side by side, so only one kind of OLED material per layer is used to produce white light. It also eliminated the uneven degradation rate of blue pixels vs. red and green pixels. Disadvantages of this method are low color purity and contrast. Also, the filters absorb most of the emitted light, requiring the background white light to be relatively strong to compensate for the drop in brightness, and thus the power consumption for such displays can be higher.

Commercial OLED television panels using this color-by-white approach are often described as WOLED or WRGB OLED. WOLED refers to the use of a white OLED light source with color filters. In many WOLED televisions, the fourth white subpixel allows unfiltered white light to pass through and can be used to increase panel brightness. In early commercial OLED televisions, Samsung used an RGB subpixel OLED approach, while LG used a white-subpixel color-filter architecture.

Color filters can also be implemented into bottom- and top-emission OLEDs. By adding the corresponding RGB color filters after the semi-transparent cathode, even purer wavelengths of light can be obtained. The use of a microcavity in top-emission OLEDs with color filters also contributes to an increase in the contrast ratio by reducing the reflection of incident ambient light. In a conventional panel, a circular polarizer was installed on the panel surface. While this was provided to prevent the reflection of ambient light, it also reduced the light output. By replacing this polarizing layer with color filters, the light intensity is not affected, and essentially all ambient reflected light can be cut, allowing a better contrast on the display panel. This potentially reduced the need for brighter pixels and can lower the power consumption.

=== Other architectures ===
==== Transparent OLEDs ====
Transparent OLEDs use transparent or semi-transparent contacts on both sides of the device to create displays that can be made to be both top and bottom emitting (transparent). TOLEDs can greatly improve contrast, making it much easier to view displays in bright sunlight. This technology can be used in head-up displays, smart windows or augmented reality applications.

==== Graded heterojunction ====
Graded heterojunction OLEDs gradually decrease the ratio of electron holes to electron transporting chemicals. This results in almost double the quantum efficiency of existing OLEDs.

==== Stacked OLEDs ====
Stacked OLEDs use a pixel architecture that stacks the red, green, and blue subpixels on top of one another instead of next to one another, leading to substantial increase in gamut and color depth, and greatly reducing pixel gap. Other display technologies with RGB (and RGBW) pixels mapped next to each other tend to decrease potential resolution.

Tandem OLEDs use multiple emissive layers of the same color stacked together. This can improve the brightness and efficiency of OLED displays.

==== Inverted OLED ====
In contrast to a conventional OLED, in which the anode is placed on the substrate, an inverted OLED uses a bottom cathode that can be connected to the drain end of an n-channel TFT, especially for the low-cost amorphous silicon TFT backplane useful in the manufacturing of AMOLED displays.

All OLED displays (passive and active matrix) use a driver IC, often mounted using the chip-on-glass (COG) technology with an anisotropic conductive film.

==== Quantum Dot OLED ====
This type of OLED will allow the color emitted from the diode to be enhanced by adding crystals (or quantum dots) to change the wavelength of the light being emitted by a diode. The light emitted by the OLED will emit blue light and the color is changed by placing crystals red shifting the wavelength of the light to emit colors closer to green and red. Typical OLED screens will be emitting white light, which will change the quality of the color being viewed.

== Manufacturing process ==
OLED displays are made in a similar way to LCDs, including manufacturing of several displays on a mother substrate that is later thinned and cut into several displays. Substrates for OLED displays come in the same sizes as those used for manufacturing LCDs. For OLED manufacture, after the formation of TFTs (for active matrix displays), addressable grids (for passive matrix displays), or indium tin oxide (ITO) segments (for segment displays), the display is coated with hole injection, transport and blocking layers, as well with electroluminescent material after the first two layers, after which ITO or metal may be applied again as a cathode. Later, the entire stack of materials is encapsulated. The TFT layer, addressable grid, or ITO segments serve as or are connected to the anode, which may be made of ITO or metal. OLEDs can be made flexible and transparent, with transparent displays being used in smartphones with optical fingerprint scanners and flexible displays being used in foldable smartphones. A circular polarizer is often laminated into the OLED panel, to improve black levels and thus contrast ratios in brightly lit rooms by reducing light reflections from the room lighting. However, QD-OLEDs may not use polarizers.

== Color patterning technologies ==
=== Shadow mask patterning method ===
The most commonly used patterning method for organic light-emitting displays is shadow masking during film deposition, also called the "RGB side-by-side" method or "RGB pixelation" method. Metal sheets with multiple apertures made of low thermal expansion material, such as nickel alloy, are placed between the heated evaporation source and substrate, so that the organic or inorganic material from the evaporation source is masked off, or blocked by the sheet from reaching the substrate in most locations, so the materials are deposited only on the desired locations on the substrate, and the rest is deposited and remains on the sheet. Almost all small OLED displays for smartphones have been manufactured using this method. Fine metal masks (FMMs) made by photochemical machining with Invar, reminiscent of old CRT shadow masks, are used in this process. The dot density of the mask will determine the pixel density of the finished display. Fine Hybrid Masks (FHMs) are lighter than FMMs, reducing bending caused by the mask's own weight, and are made using an electroforming process. This method requires heating the electroluminescent materials at 300 °C using a thermal method in a high vacuum of 10^{−5} Pa. An oxygen meter ensures that no oxygen enters the chamber as it could damage (through oxidation) the electroluminescent material, which is in powder form. The mask is aligned with the mother substrate before every use, and it is placed just below the substrate. The substrate and mask assembly are placed at the top of the deposition chamber. Afterwards, the electrode layer is deposited, by subjecting silver and aluminum powder to 1000 °C, using an electron beam. Shadow masks allow for high pixel densities of up to 2,250 DPI (890 dot/cm). High pixel densities are necessary for virtual reality headsets.

=== White + color filter method (WOLED) ===
Although the shadow-mask patterning method is a mature technology used from the first OLED manufacturing, it causes many issues like dark spot formation due to mask-substrate contact or misalignment of the pattern due to the deformation of shadow mask. Such defect formation can be regarded as trivial when the display size is small, however it causes serious issues when a large display is manufactured, which brings significant production yield loss. To circumvent such issues, white emission devices with 4-sub-pixel color filters (white, red, green and blue) have been used for large televisions. In spite of the light absorption by the color filter, state-of-the-art OLED televisions can reproduce color very well, such as 100% NTSC, and consume little power at the same time. This is done by using an emission spectrum with high human-eye sensitivity, special color filters with a low spectrum overlap, and performance tuning with color statistics into consideration. This approach is also called the "Color-by-white" method.

The white, red, green and blue subpixel arrangement used in many color-by-white OLED television panels is commonly referred to as WRGB OLED. This architecture differs from direct-emission RGB OLED and QD-OLED panels. Direct RGB OLED uses separate red, green and blue emissive subpixels, while QD-OLED uses blue OLED light and quantum-dot color conversion instead of the WOLED color-by-white structure. WOLED and QD-OLED are both self-emissive OLED technologies, whereas Mini LED televisions are LCD displays that use LED backlights, often with local dimming zones.

=== Other color patterning approaches ===
There are other types of emerging patterning technologies to increase the manufacturability of OLEDs. Patternable organic light-emitting devices use a light or heat activated electroactive layer. A latent material (PEDOT-TMA) is included in this layer that, upon activation, becomes highly efficient as a hole injection layer. Using this process, light-emitting devices with arbitrary patterns can be prepared.

Colour patterning can be accomplished by means of a laser, such as a radiation-induced sublimation transfer (RIST).

Organic vapour jet printing (OVJP) uses an inert carrier gas, such as argon or nitrogen, to transport evaporated organic molecules (as in organic vapour phase deposition). The gas is expelled through a micrometre-sized nozzle or nozzle array close to the substrate as it is being translated. This allows printing arbitrary multilayer patterns without the use of solvents.

Like ink jet material deposition, inkjet etching (IJE) deposits precise amounts of solvent onto a substrate designed to selectively dissolve the substrate material and induce a structure or pattern. Inkjet etching of polymer layers in OLEDs can be used to increase the overall out-coupling efficiency. In OLEDs, light produced from the emissive layers of the OLED is partially transmitted out of the device and partially trapped inside the device by total internal reflection (TIR). This trapped light is wave-guided along the interior of the device until it reaches an edge where it is dissipated by either absorption or emission. Inkjet etching can be used to selectively alter the polymeric layers of OLED structures to decrease overall TIR and increase out-coupling efficiency of the OLED. Compared to a non-etched polymer layer, the structured polymer layer in the OLED structure from the IJE process helps to decrease the TIR of the OLED device. IJE solvents are commonly organic instead of water-based due to their non-acidic nature and ability to effectively dissolve materials at temperatures under the boiling point of water.

Transfer-printing is an emerging technology to assemble large numbers of parallel OLED and AMOLED devices efficiently. It takes advantage of standard metal deposition, photolithography, and etching to create alignment marks commonly on glass or other device substrates. Thin polymer adhesive layers are applied to enhance resistance to particles and surface defects. Microscale ICs are transfer-printed onto the adhesive surface and then baked to fully cure adhesive layers. An additional photosensitive polymer layer is applied to the substrate to account for the topography caused by the printed ICs, reintroducing a flat surface. Photolithography and etching removes some polymer layers to uncover conductive pads on the ICs. Afterwards, the anode layer is applied to the device backplane to form the bottom electrode. OLED layers are applied to the anode layer with conventional vapor deposition, and covered with a conductive metal electrode layer. As of 2011 transfer-printing was capable to print onto target substrates up to 500 mm × 400 mm. This size limit needs to expand for transfer-printing to become a common process for the fabrication of large OLED/AMOLED displays.

Experimental OLED displays using conventional photolithography techniques instead of FMMs have been demonstrated, allowing for large substrate sizes (as it eliminates the need for a mask that needs to be as large as the substrate) and good yield control. Visionox has announced the use of photolithography for depositing OLED emissive materials.

== Thin-film transistor backplanes ==
For a high resolution display like a TV, a thin-film transistor (TFT) backplane is necessary to drive the pixels correctly. As of 2019, low-temperature polycrystalline silicon (LTPS) – TFT is widely used for commercial AMOLED displays due to its superior current handling capacity over amorphous silicon (a-Si) TFTs. LTPS-TFT has variation of the performance in a display, so various compensation circuits have been reported. Due to the size limitation of the excimer laser used for LTPS, the AMOLED size was limited. To cope with the hurdle related to the panel size, amorphous-silicon/microcrystalline-silicon backplanes have been reported with large display prototype demonstrations. An indium gallium zinc oxide (IGZO) backplane can also be used. Large OLED displays usually use AOS (amorphous oxide semiconductor) TFT transistors instead, also called oxide TFTs and these are usually based on IGZO.

Many AMOLED displays use LTPO TFT transistors. These transistors offer stability at low refresh rates, and variable refresh rates, which allows for power saving displays that do not show visual artifacts.

== Advantages ==
The different manufacturing process of OLEDs has several advantages over flat-panel displays made with LCD technology.

Lower cost in the future
OLEDs can be printed onto any suitable substrate by an inkjet printer or even by screen printing, theoretically making them cheaper to produce than LCD or plasma displays. However, fabrication of the OLED substrate as of 2018 is costlier than that for TFT LCDs. Roll-to-roll vapor-deposition methods for organic devices do allow mass production of thousands of devices per minute for minimal cost; however, this technique also induces problems: devices with multiple layers can be challenging to make because of registration — lining up the different printed layers to the required degree of accuracy.

Lightweight and flexible plastic substrates
OLED displays can be fabricated on flexible plastic substrates, leading to the possible fabrication of flexible organic light-emitting diodes for other new applications, such as roll-up displays embedded in fabrics or clothing. If a substrate like polyethylene terephthalate (PET) can be used, the displays may be produced inexpensively. Furthermore, plastic substrates are shatter-resistant, unlike the glass displays used in LCD devices. Flexible OLED displays are made on polyamide plastic films which are bonded to glass panels during production. Once the OLED display is encapsulated, a Laser is used to separate the plastic from the glass in a Laser Lift-Off (LLO) process. The flexibility of these substrates will allow for smaller devices to be made to be thinner and made lighter.

Power efficiency
LCDs filter the light emitted from a backlight, allowing a small fraction of light through. Thus, they cannot show true black. However, an inactive OLED element does not produce light or consume power, allowing true blacks. Removing the backlight also makes OLEDs lighter because some substrates are not needed.

Response time
OLEDs also have a much faster response time than an LCD. Using response time compensation technologies, the fastest modern LCDs can reach response times as low as 1 ms for their fastest color transition, and are capable of refresh frequencies as high as 240 Hz. According to LG, OLED response times are up to 1,000 times faster than LCD, putting conservative estimates at under 10 μs (0.01 ms), which could theoretically accommodate refresh frequencies approaching 100 kHz (100,000 Hz). Due to their extremely fast response time, OLED displays can also be easily designed to be strobed, creating an effect similar to CRT flicker in order to avoid the sample-and-hold behavior seen on both LCDs and some OLED displays, which creates the perception of motion blur.

High dynamic range support
Because OLEDs can turn off individual pixels showing true black, the contrast ratio of an OLED display can be very large, which allows for representation of high dynamic range (HDR) images and video at high quality. Data must be encoded with a HDR format to display in HDR, and HDR format support varies by OLED display. Maximum (peak) brightness also varies by OLED display, which impacts the dynamic range that can be represented.

== Disadvantages ==
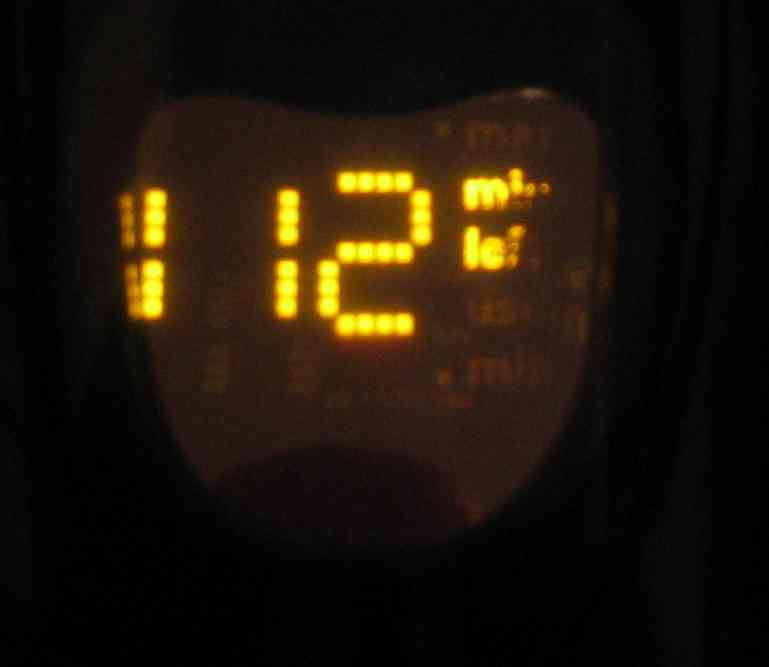
Light-emitting polymer (LEP) display showing partial failure

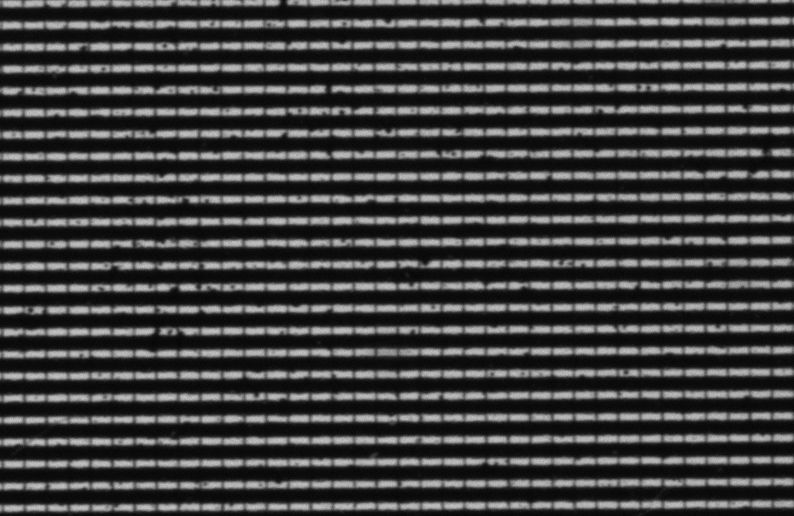
An old OLED display showing wear

=== Lifespan ===
The biggest technical problem for OLEDs is the limited lifetime of the organic materials. One 2008 technical report on an OLED TV panel found that after 1,000 hours, the blue luminance degraded by 12%, the red by 7% and the green by 8%. In particular, blue OLEDs at that time had a lifetime of around 14,000 hours to half original brightness (five years at eight hours per day) when used for flat-panel displays. This is lower than the typical lifetime of LCD, LED or PDP technology; each rated for about 25,000–40,000 hours to half brightness, depending on manufacturer and model. One major challenge for OLED displays is the formation of dark spots due to the ingress of oxygen and moisture, which degrades the organic material over time whether or not the display is powered. In 2016, LG Electronics reported an expected lifetime of 100,000 hours, up from 36,000 hours in 2013. A US Department of Energy paper shows that the expected lifespans of OLED lighting products goes down with increasing brightness, with an expected lifespan of 40,000 hours at 25% brightness, or 10,000 hours at 100% brightness. Compared to LCDs, OLEDs may be more susceptible to screen burn-in and/or brightness degradation.

==== Degradation ====
Degradation occurs because of the accumulation of nonradiative recombination centers and luminescence quenchers in the emissive zone. It is said that the chemical breakdown in the semiconductors occurs in four steps:

1. recombination (Note: The energy absorbed by a material is released in the form of photons. Generally these photons contain the same or less energy than those initially absorbed. This effect is how LEDs create light.) of charge carriers through the absorption of UV light
2. homolytic dissociation
3. subsequent radical addition reactions that form π radicals
4. disproportionation between two radicals resulting in hydrogen-atom transfer reactions

In 2007, experimental OLEDs were created which can sustain 400 cd/m^{2} of luminance for over 198,000 hours for green OLEDs and 62,000 hours for blue OLEDs. In 2012, OLED lifetime to half of the initial brightness was improved to 900,000 hours for red, 1,450,000 hours for yellow and 400,000 hours for green at an initial luminance of 1,000 cd/m^{2}. Proper encapsulation is critical for prolonging an OLED display's lifetime, as the OLED light emitting electroluminescent materials are sensitive to oxygen and moisture. When exposed to moisture or oxygen, the electroluminescent materials in OLEDs degrade as they oxidize, generating black spots and reducing or shrinking the area that emits light, reducing light output. This reduction can occur in a pixel by pixel basis. This can also lead to delamination of the electrode layer, eventually leading to complete panel failure.

Degradation occurs three orders of magnitude faster when exposed to moisture than when exposed to oxygen. Encapsulation can be performed by applying an epoxy adhesive with dessicant, by laminating a glass sheet with epoxy glue and dessicant followed by vacuum degassing, or by using Thin-Film Encapsulation (TFE), which is a multi-layer coating of alternating organic and inorganic layers. The organic layers are applied using inkjet printing, and the inorganic layers are applied using Atomic Layer Deposition (ALD). The encapsulation process is carried out under a nitrogen environment, using UV-curable LOCA glue and the electroluminescent and electrode material deposition processes are carried out under a high vacuum. The encapsulation and material deposition processes are carried out by a single machine, after the thin-film transistors have been applied. The transistors are applied in a process that is the same for LCDs. The electroluminescent materials can also be applied using inkjet printing.

=== Color balance ===
The OLED material used to produce blue light degrades much more rapidly than the materials used to produce other colors; in other words, blue light output will decrease relative to the other colors of light. This variation in the differential color output will change the color balance of the display, and is much more noticeable than a uniform decrease in overall luminance. This can be avoided partially by adjusting the color balance, but this may require advanced control circuits and input from a knowledgeable user. More commonly, though, manufacturers optimize the size of the R, G and B subpixels to reduce the current density through the subpixel in order to equalize lifetime at full luminance. For example, a blue subpixel may be 75% larger than the green subpixel. The red subpixel may be 10% larger than the green.

=== Efficiency of blue OLEDs ===
Improvements to the efficiency and lifetime of blue OLEDs assists in the success of OLEDs as replacements for LCD technology. Research has been invested in developing blue OLEDs with high external quantum efficiency, as well as a deeper blue color.

Since 2012, research focuses on organic materials exhibiting thermally activated delayed fluorescence (TADF), discovered at Kyushu University's OPERA and UC Santa Barbara's Center for Polymers and Organic Solids (CPOS). TADF would allow stable and high-efficiency solution processable (meaning that the organic materials are layered in solutions producing thinner layers) blue emitters, with internal quantum efficiencies reaching 100%. Early in 2017, TADF materials based on oxygen-based fully bridged boron-type electron-acceptors had achieved huge breakthrough in their performance. The external quantum efficiency of TADF-OLED for blue and green light had achieved 38%, with thin full-width half-maximum and high color purity. In 2022, Han et al. synthesized a new D-A type luminescent material, TDBA-Cz, and used the m-AC-DBNA synthesized by Meng et al. as a control to investigate the effect of the substitution site of the carbazole unit as an electron donor on the oxygen-bridged triphenylboron electron acceptor unit on the photophysical properties of the overall molecule. It was found that the introduction of two carbazole units into the same benzene ring of the oxygen-bridged triphenylboron electron acceptor unit could effectively suppress the conformational relaxation of the molecule during the radiative transition, resulting in narrow bandwidth blue light emission. In addition, TDBA-Cz is the first reported blue material to achieve both a FWHM down to 45 nm and a maximum EQE of 21.4% in a non-doped TADF-OLED.

Blue TADF emitters are expected to market by 2020 and would be used for WOLED displays with phosphorescent color filters, as well as blue OLED displays with ink-printed QD color filters.

=== Water damage ===
Water can instantly damage the organic materials of the displays. Therefore, improved sealing processes are important for practical manufacturing. Water damage especially may limit the longevity of more flexible displays.

=== Outdoor performance ===
As an emissive display technology, OLEDs rely completely upon converting electricity to light, unlike most LCDs which are to some extent reflective. E-paper leads the way in efficiency with ~ 33% ambient light reflectivity, enabling the display to be used without any internal light source. The metallic cathode in an OLED acts as a mirror, with reflectance approaching 80%, leading to poor readability in bright ambient light such as outdoors. However, with the proper application of a circular polarizer and antireflective coatings, the diffuse reflectance can be reduced to less than 0.1%. With 10,000 fc incident illumination (typical test condition for simulating outdoor illumination), that yields an approximate photopic contrast of 5:1. Advances in OLED technologies, however, enable OLEDs to become better than LCDs in bright sunlight. The AMOLED display in the Galaxy S5, for example, was found to outperform all LCDs on the market in terms of power usage, brightness and reflectance.

=== Power consumption ===
While an OLED will consume around 40% of the power of an LCD showing an image that is primarily black, for the majority of images it will consume 60–80% of the power of an LCD. However, an OLED can use more than 300% power to display an image with a white background, such as a document or web site. This can lead to reduced battery life in mobile devices when white backgrounds are used.

=== Screen flicker ===
Many OLEDs use pulse width modulation to display colour/brightness gradations. For example, a pixel instructed to display gray will flicker on and off rapidly, creating a subtle strobe effect. The alternative way to decrease brightness would be to decrease power to the display, which would eliminate screen flicker to the detriment of colour balance, which deteriorates as brightness decreases. However, use of PWM gradations may be more harmful for eye health. Many LCDs use direct current dimming.

== Manufacturers and commercial uses ==
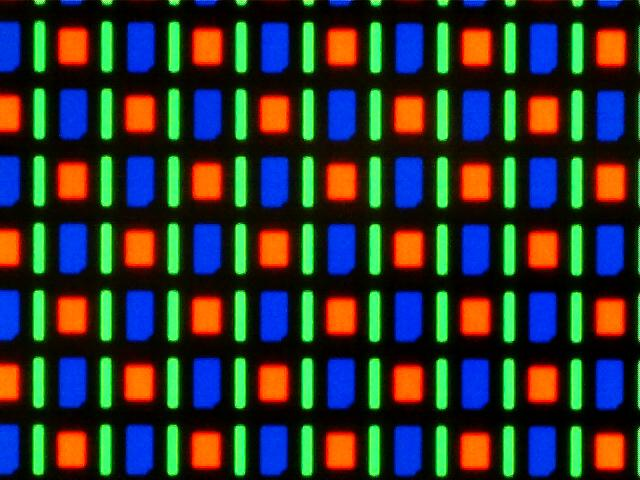
Magnified image of the AMOLED screen on the Google Nexus One smartphone using the RGBG system of the PenTile Matrix Family

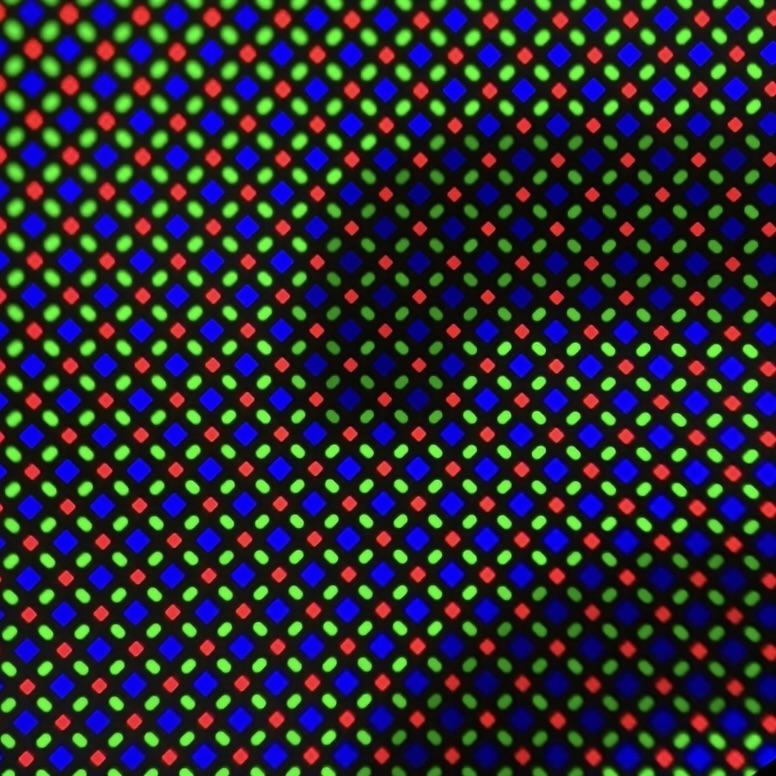
100X Magnification image of the iPhone 16 Pro's Super Retina XDR OLED Display, which uses LTPO OLED screen technology. This specific sub-pixel layout is called the "diamond pixel" arrangement.

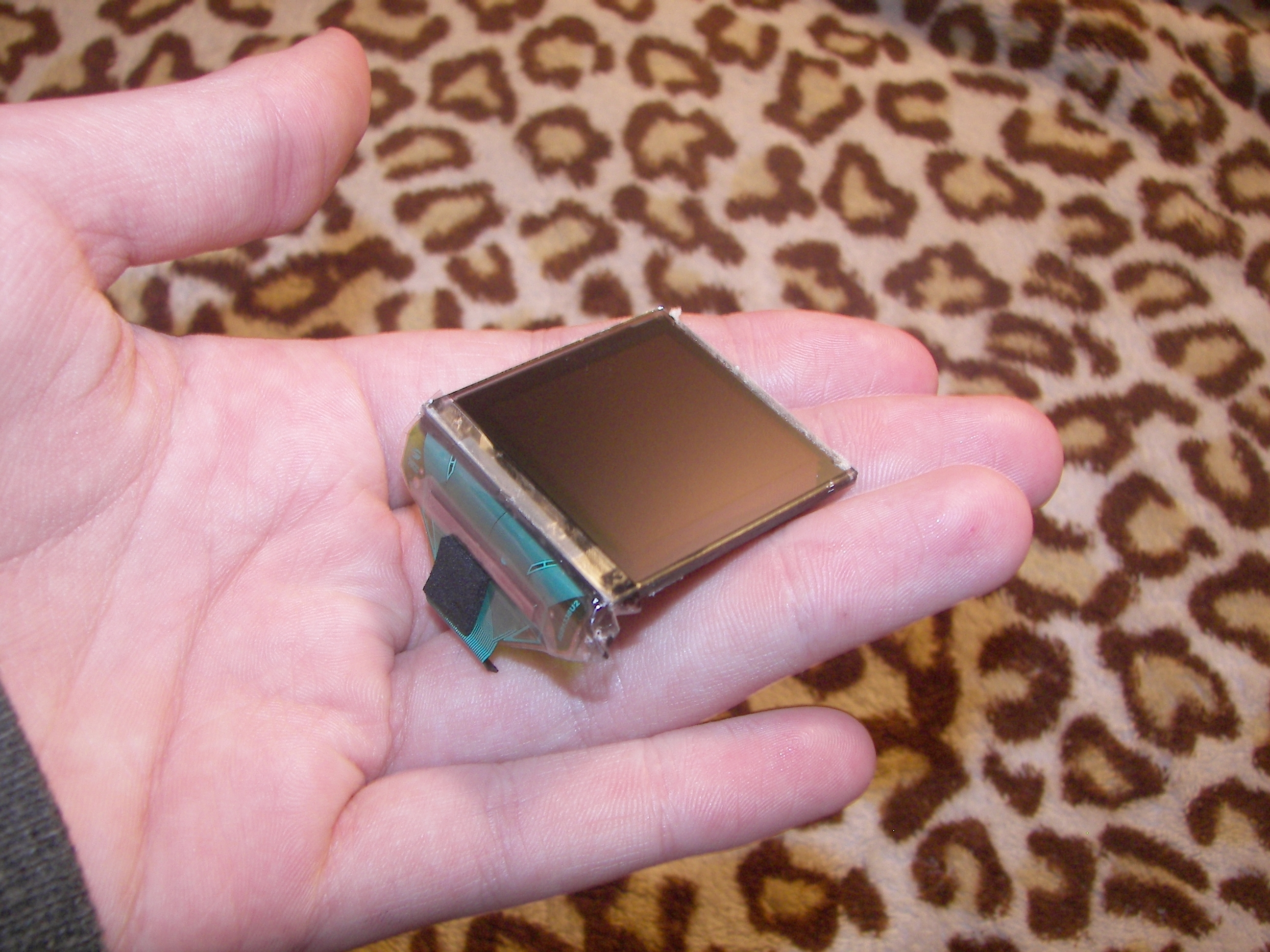
A 3.8 cm (1.5 in) OLED display from a Creative ZEN V media player

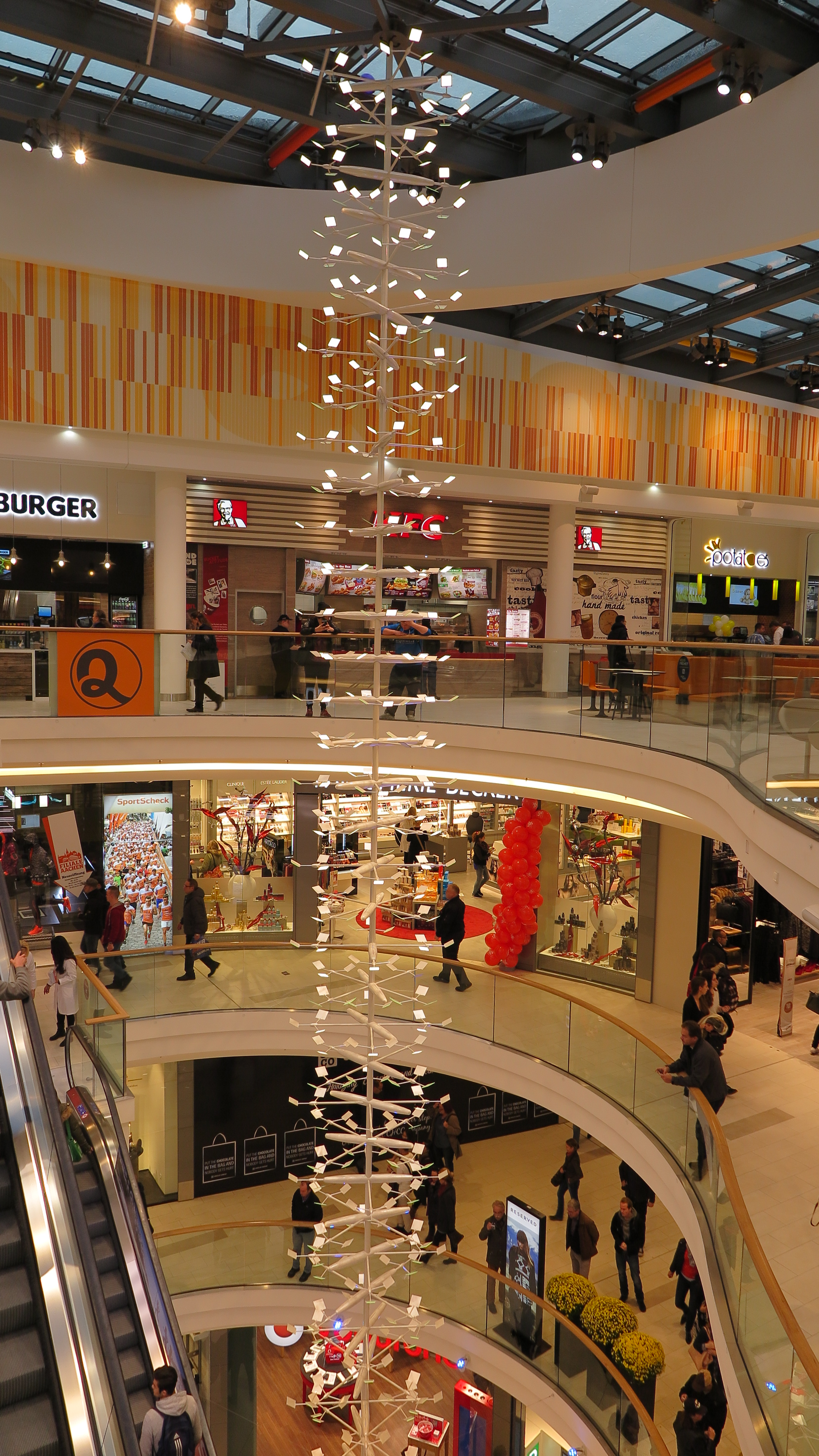
OLED lighting in a shopping mall in Aachen, Germany

Almost all OLED manufacturers rely on material deposition equipment that is only made by a handful of companies, the most notable one being Canon Tokki, a unit of Canon Inc. although Ulvac and Sunic System are also notable. Canon Tokki is reported to have a near-monopoly of the giant OLED-manufacturing vacuum machines, notable for their 100-metre (330 ft) size. Apple has relied solely on Canon Tokki in its bid to introduce its own OLED displays for the iPhones released in 2017. The electroluminescent materials needed for OLEDs are also made by a handful of companies, some of them being Merck, Universal Display Corporation and LG Chem. The machines that apply these materials can operate continuously for 5–6 days, and can process a mother substrate in 5 minutes.

OLED displays are mainly made by Samsung Display and LG Display. OLED technology is used in commercial applications such as displays for mobile phones and portable digital media players, car radios and digital cameras among others, as well as lighting. Such portable display applications favor the high light output of OLEDs for readability in sunlight and their low power drain. Portable displays are also used intermittently, so the lower lifespan of organic displays is less of an issue. Prototypes have been made of flexible and rollable displays which use OLEDs' unique characteristics. Applications in flexible signs and lighting are also being developed. OLED lighting offers several advantages over LED lighting, such as higher quality illumination, more diffuse light source, and panel shapes. Philips Lighting has made OLED lighting samples under the brand name "Lumiblade" available online and Novaled AG based in Dresden, Germany, introduced a line of OLED desk lamps called "Victory" in September, 2011.

The first OLED display on a cell phone was Motorola's Timeport P8767 in 2000, although this technology was not widely adopted until a few years later appearing on many Motorola and Samsung color and clamshell cell phones, as well as some HTC, LG and Sony Ericsson models. Nokia introduced OLED mobile phones in the late 2000s including the N85 and the N86 8MP, both of which feature an AMOLED display. OLED technology can also be found in digital media players such as the Creative ZEN V, the iriver clix, the Zune HD and the Sony Walkman X Series.

The Google and HTC Nexus One smartphone includes an AMOLED screen, as does HTC's own Desire and Legend phones. However, due to supply shortages of the Samsung-produced displays, certain HTC models will use Sony's SLCD displays in the future, while the Google and Samsung Nexus S smartphone will use "Super Clear LCD" instead in some countries.

OLED displays were used in watches made by Fossil (JR-9465) and Diesel (DZ-7086). Other manufacturers of OLED panels include Anwell Technologies Limited (Hong Kong), AU Optronics (Taiwan), Chimei Innolux Corporation (Taiwan), LG (Korea), and others.

DuPont stated in a press release in May 2010, that they can produce a 50-inch OLED TV in two minutes with a new printing technology. If this can be scaled up in terms of manufacturing, then the total cost of OLED TVs would be greatly reduced. DuPont also states that OLED TVs made with this less expensive technology can last up to 15 years if left on for a normal eight-hour day.

The use of OLEDs may be subject to patents held by Universal Display Corporation, Eastman Kodak, DuPont, General Electric, Royal Philips Electronics, numerous universities and others. By 2008, thousands of patents associated with OLEDs, came from larger corporations and smaller technology companies.

Flexible OLED displays have been used by manufacturers to create curved displays such as the Galaxy S7 Edge but they were not in devices that can be flexed by the users. Samsung demonstrated a roll-out display in 2016.

Samsung foldable smartphones

On 31 October 2018, Royole, a Chinese electronics company, unveiled the world's first foldable screen phone featuring a flexible OLED display. On 20 February 2019, Samsung announced the Samsung Galaxy Fold with a foldable OLED display from Samsung Display, its majority-owned subsidiary. At MWC 2019 on 25 February 2019, Huawei announced the Huawei Mate X featuring a foldable OLED display from BOE.

The 2010s also saw the wide adoption of tracking gate-line in pixel (TGP), which moves the driving circuitry from the borders of the display to in between the display's pixels, allowing for narrow bezels.

In 2023 the German startup Inuru has announced to manufacture low-cost OLED with printing for packaging and fashion applications.

=== Fashion ===
Textiles incorporating OLEDs are an innovation in the fashion world and pose for a way to integrate lighting to bring inert objects to a whole new level of fashion. The hope is to combine the comfort and low cost properties of textile with the OLEDs properties of illumination and low energy consumption. Although this scenario of illuminated clothing is highly plausible, challenges are still a road block. Some issues include: the lifetime of the OLED, rigidness of flexible foil substrates, and the lack of research in making more fabric like photonic textiles.

=== Automotive ===
The number of automakers using OLEDs is still rare and limited to the high-end of the market. For example, the 2010 Lexus RX features an OLED display instead of a thin-film transistor (TFT-LCD) display.

A Japanese manufacturer Pioneer Electronic Corporation produced the first car stereos with a monochrome OLED display, which was also the world's first OLED product. The Aston Martin DB9 incorporated the world's first automotive OLED display, which was manufactured by Yazaki, followed by the 2004 Jeep Grand Cherokee and the Chevrolet Corvette C6. The 2015 Hyundai Sonata and Kia Soul EV use a 3.5-inch white PMOLED display.

=== Company-specific applications ===
==== Samsung ====
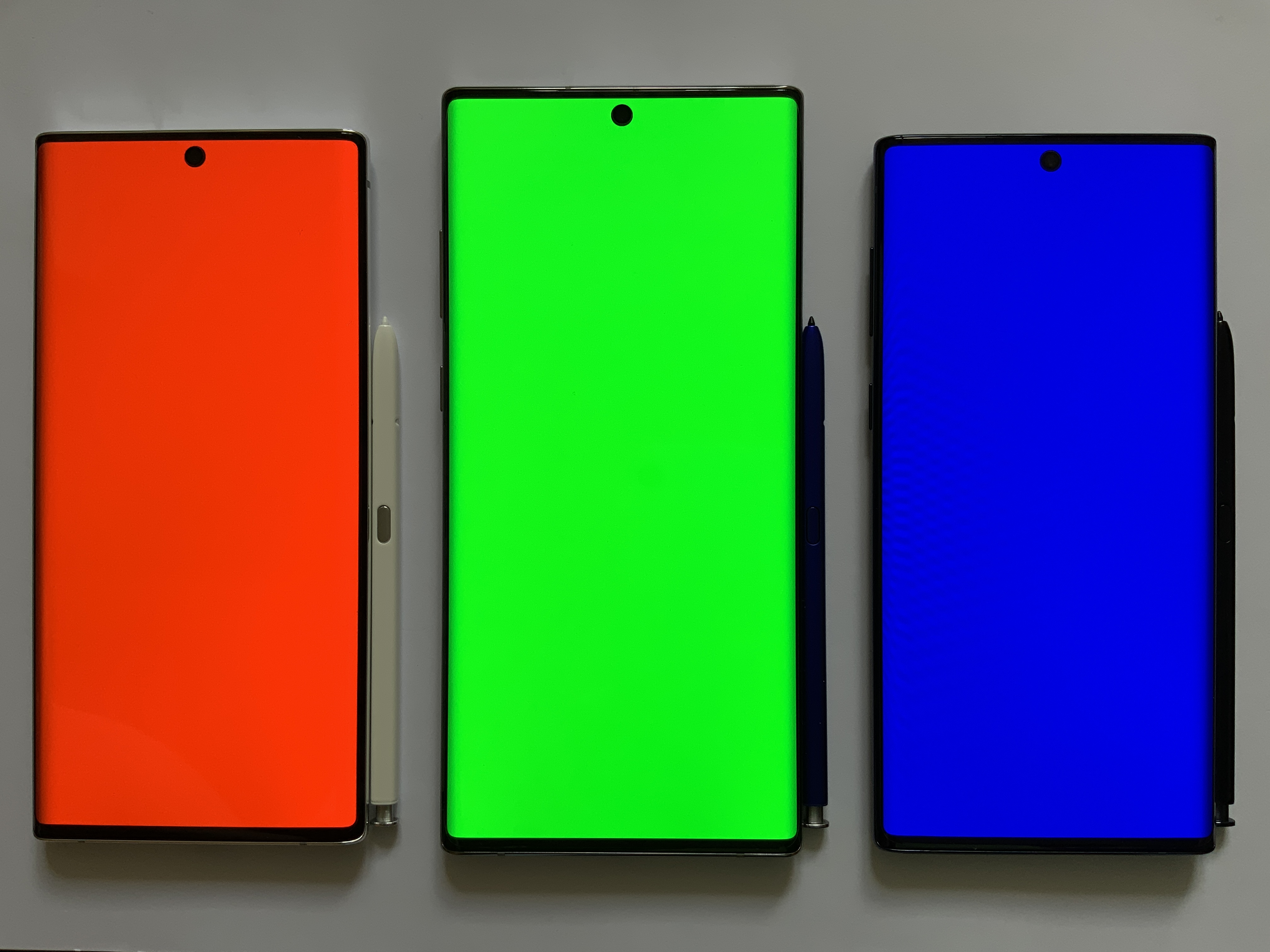
Samsung AMOLED displays

By 2004, Samsung Display, a subsidiary of South Korea's largest conglomerate and a former Samsung-NEC joint venture, was the world's largest OLED manufacturer, producing 40% of the OLED displays made in the world, and as of 2010, has a 98% share of the global AMOLED market. The company is leading the world of OLED industry, generating $100.2 million out of the total $475 million revenues in the global OLED market in 2006. As of 2006, it held more than 600 American patents and more than 2800 international patents, making it the largest owner of AMOLED technology patents.

Samsung SDI announced in 2005, the world's largest OLED TV at the time, at 21 inches (53 cm). This OLED featured the highest resolution at the time, of 6.22 million pixels. In addition, the company adopted active matrix-based technology for its low power consumption and high-resolution qualities. This was exceeded in January 2008, when Samsung showcased the world's largest and thinnest OLED TV at the time, at 31 inches (78 cm) and 4.3 mm.

In May 2008, Samsung unveiled an ultra-thin 12.1 inch (30 cm) laptop OLED display concept, with a 1,280×768 resolution with infinite contrast ratio. According to Woo Jong Lee, Vice President of the Mobile Display Marketing Team at Samsung SDI, the company expected OLED displays to be used in notebook PCs as soon as 2010.

In October 2008, Samsung showcased the world's thinnest OLED display, also the first to be "flappable" and bendable. It measures just 0.05 mm (thinner than paper), yet a Samsung staff member said that it is "technically possible to make the panel thinner". To achieve this thickness, Samsung etched an OLED panel that uses a normal glass substrate. The drive circuit was formed by low-temperature polysilicon TFTs. Also, low-molecular organic EL materials were employed. The pixel count of the display is 480 × 272. The contrast ratio is 100,000:1, and the luminance is 200 cd/m^{2}. The colour reproduction range is 100% of the NTSC standard.

At the Consumer Electronics Show (CES) in January 2010, Samsung demonstrated a laptop computer with a large, transparent OLED display featuring up to 40% transparency and an animated OLED display in a photo ID card.

Samsung's 2010 AMOLED smartphones used their Super AMOLED trademark, with the Samsung Wave S8500 and Samsung i9000 Galaxy S being launched in June 2010. In January 2011, Samsung announced their Super AMOLED Plus displays, which offer several advances over the older Super AMOLED displays: real stripe matrix (50% more sub pixels), thinner form factor, brighter image and an 18% reduction in energy consumption.

At CES 2012, Samsung introduced the first 55" TV screen that uses Super OLED technology.

On 8 January 2013, at CES Samsung unveiled a unique curved 4K Ultra S9 OLED television, which they state provides an "IMAX-like experience" for viewers.

On 13 August 2013, Samsung announced availability of a 55-inch curved OLED TV (model KN55S9C) in the US at a price point of $8999.99.

On 6 September 2013, Samsung launched its 55-inch curved OLED TV (model KE55S9C) in the United Kingdom with John Lewis.

Samsung introduced the Galaxy Round smartphone in the Korean market in October 2013. The device features a 1080p screen, measuring 5.7 inches (14 cm), that curves on the vertical axis in a rounded case. The corporation has promoted the following advantages: A new feature called "Round Interaction" that allows users to look at information by tilting the handset on a flat surface with the screen off, and the feel of one continuous transition when the user switches between home screens.

Samsung released a new line of OLED TVs in 2022, its first using the technology since 2013. They use panels sourced from Samsung Display; previously, LG was the sole manufacturer of OLED panels for TVs.

==== Sony ====
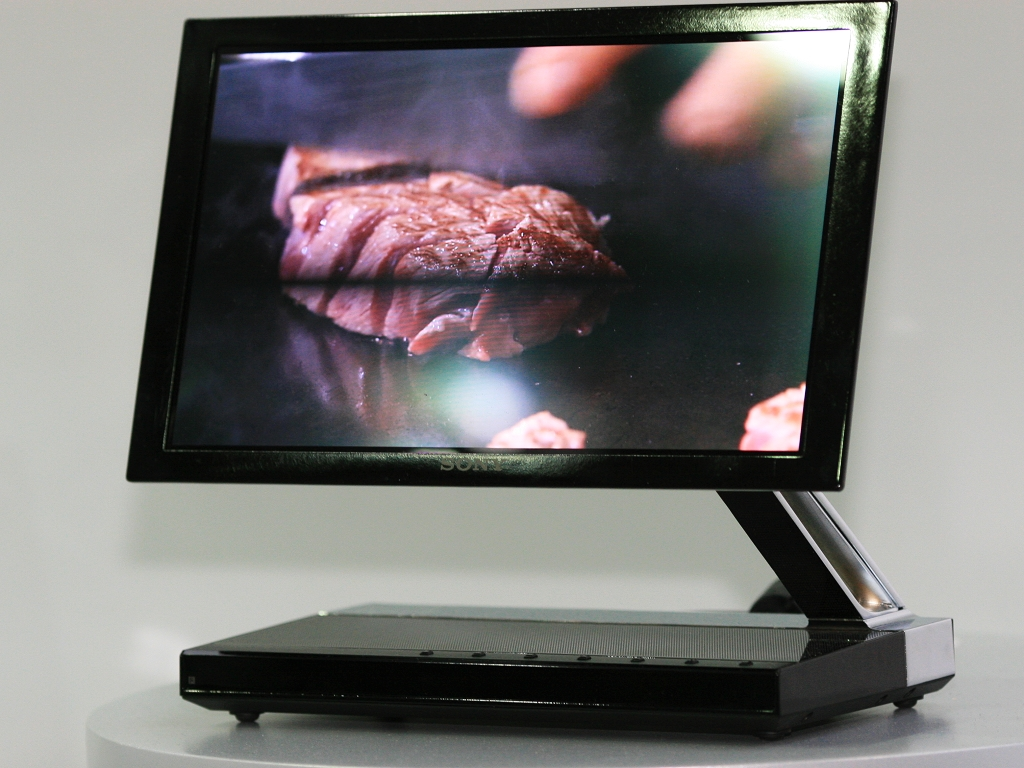
Sony XEL-1, the world's first OLED TV (front)

The Sony CLIÉ PEG-VZ90 was released in 2004, being the first PDA to feature an OLED screen. Other Sony products to feature OLED screens include the MZ-RH1 portable minidisc recorder, released in 2006 and the Walkman X Series.

At the 2007, Las Vegas Consumer Electronics Show (CES), Sony showcased a 11-inch (28 cm), (resolution 960×540) and 27-inch (69 cm), full HD resolution at 1920 × 1080 OLED TV models. Both claimed 1,000,000:1 contrast ratios and total thicknesses (including bezels) of 5 mm. In April 2007, Sony announced it would manufacture 1000 11-inch (28 cm) OLED TVs per month for market testing purposes. On 1 October 2007, Sony announced that the 11-inch (28 cm) model XEL-1, was the first commercial OLED TV and it was released in Japan in December 2007.

In May 2007, Sony publicly unveiled a video of a 2.5-inch (6.4 cm) flexible OLED screen which is only 0.3 millimeters thick. At the Display 2008 exhibition, Sony demonstrated a 0.2 mm thick 3.5 inches (8.9 cm) display with a resolution of 320×200 pixels and a 0.3 mm thick 11-inch (28 cm) display with 960×540 pixels resolution, one-tenth the thickness of the XEL-1.

In July 2008, a Japanese government body said it would fund a joint project of leading firms, which is to develop a key technology to produce large, energy-saving organic displays. The project involves one laboratory and 10 companies including Sony Corp. NEDO said the project was aimed at developing a core technology to mass-produce 40 inch or larger OLED displays in the late 2010s.

In October 2008, Sony published results of research it carried out with the Max Planck Institute over the possibility of mass-market bending displays, which could replace rigid LCDs and plasma screens. Eventually, bendable, see-through displays could be stacked to produce 3D images with much greater contrast ratios and viewing angles than existing products.

Sony exhibited a 24.5" (62 cm) prototype OLED 3D television during the Consumer Electronics Show in January 2010.

In January 2011, Sony announced the PlayStation Vita handheld game console (the successor to the PSP) will feature a 5-inch OLED screen.

On 17 February 2011, Sony announced its 25" (63.5 cm) OLED Professional Reference Monitor aimed at the Cinema and high end Drama Post Production market.

On 25 June 2012, Sony and Panasonic announced a joint venture for creating low cost mass production OLED televisions by 2013. Sony unveiled its first OLED TV since 2008 at CES 2017 called A1E. It revealed two other models in 2018 one at CES 2018 called A8F and other a Master Series TV called A9F. At CES 2019 they unveiled another two models one the A8G and the other another Bravia Series TV called A9G. Then, at CES 2020, they revealed the A8H, which was effectively an A9G in terms of picture quality but with some compromises due to its lower cost. At the same event, they also revealed a 48-inch version of the A9G, making this its smallest OLED TV since the XEL-1.

==== LG ====
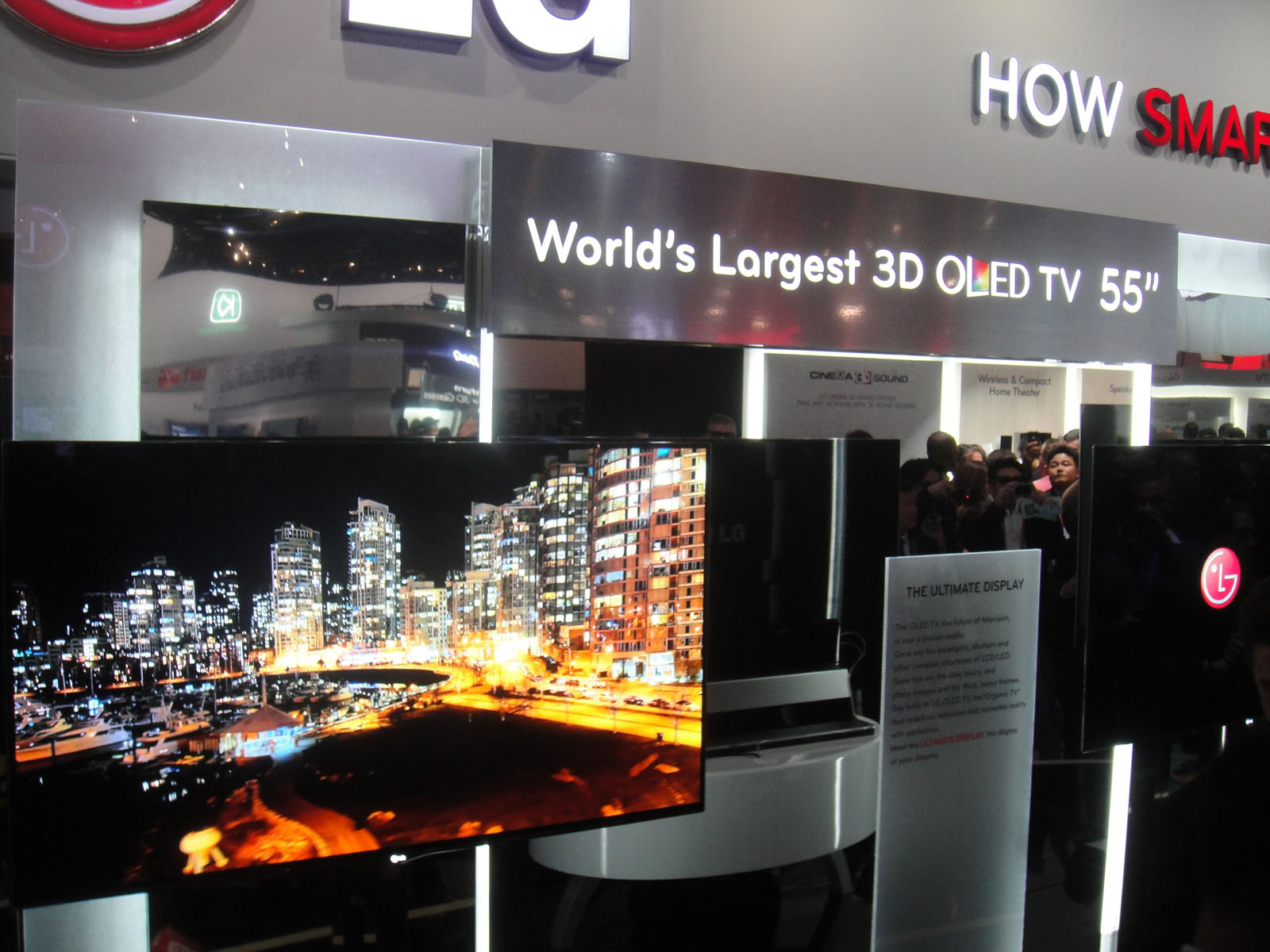
The world's first 55-inch OLED TV (LG 55EM9600)

On 9 April 2009, LG acquired Kodak's OLED business and started to utilize white OLED technology. As of 2010, LG Electronics produced one model of OLED television, the 15-inch (38 cm) 15EL9500 and had announced a 31-inch (79 cm) OLED 3D television for March 2011. On 26 December 2011, LG officially announced the "world's largest 55-inch (140 cm) OLED panel" and featured it at CES 2012. In late 2012, LG announces the launch of the 55EM9600 OLED television in Australia.

In January 2013, LG began taking orders in South Korea for a 55-inch OLED television. In 2013, LG commercialized curved OLED television models, beginning with pre-orders in South Korea for a 55-inch curved OLED TV before later rollouts in the United States and Europe. In August 2014, LG introduced 65-inch and 77-inch 4K OLED televisions, with preorders opened in South Korea. As of 2022, LG produces the world's largest OLED TV, at 97 inches.

In January 2015, LG Display signed a long-term agreement with Universal Display Corporation for the supply of OLED materials and the right to use their patented OLED emitters. In 2015, LG Display announced a more than 10 trillion won investment plan for a new OLED panel plant in Paju, South Korea, with planned production across product segments including large television screens and flexible OLED panels for smartwatches and automotive displays. In 2018, Chinese authorities approved LG Display's plan for an OLED factory in Guangzhou, China, a facility designed to increase large-scale OLED plate output to 130,000 from 60,000 plates. By 2021, the Guangzhou Gen 8.5 OLED TV panel fab accounted for over 50% of LG Display's total WOLED TV panel production. In 2022, LG Display completed the transition of its OLED TV panel production to OLED EX, a deuterium-based OLED panel technology used across new OLED TV displays manufactured at its Paju and Guangzhou plants. In 2023, LG Display commercialized micro-lens array technology in its WOLED panels through its META technology platform. In 2024, LG Display agreed to sell its stake in a Guangzhou LCD plant while continuing to produce large-sized OLED panels in China. In 2026, LG Display introduced a further iteration of its large-panel WOLED technology under the Tandem WOLED name, using an improved Primary RGB Tandem 2.0 structure.

In the OLED television supply chain, LG Display panels were used by a wider range of consumer electronics manufacturers. By 2022, LG Display supplied OLED panels to more than 20 television brands, including LG, Hisense, Sony, Panasonic, Philips and Vizio. In January 2024, Samsung and LG Display signed a five-year long-term supply agreement for WOLED TV panels, with delivery beginning with 1 million units in 2024.

The thin and flexible structure of OLED panels shaped LG's television designs. At CES 2017, the company introduced the LG Signature OLED W, commonly known as the “Wallpaper TV”, a wall-mounted OLED television connected to a separate component and speaker box. At CES 2019, LG introduced a rollable OLED television whose screen could retract into its base.

Beyond consumer televisions, LG has used OLED technology in commercial display products. In 2019, LG launched a 55-inch transparent OLED digital signage display in the United States for commercial applications including retail and hospitality; the display allowed video to be shown while objects and images behind the screen remained visible, and LG also showed open-frame commercial OLED displays that could be bent at the installation site. LG Display's OLED panels have been used in automotive displays, including flexible OLED panels adopted in Cadillac and Mercedes-Benz models; at SID 2022, LG Display showed a 34-inch automotive OLED panel used in Hyundai Mobis' ultra-large movable screen concept, and its flexible automotive OLED panels used a tandem, two-layer RGB stack structure to improve lifetime and reliability. LG Display has supplied smartphone displays to Apple. In 2024, Apple began ordering OLED displays from BOE Technology and LG Display for a lower-cost iPhone model, as part of a broader shift away from LCD displays in iPhones.

===== Recent developments (2026) =====
In 2026, LG introduced several innovations across its OLED product line, including the "Hyper Radiant Color Tech" picture system and an updated "Wallpaper" OLED design.

===== Hyper Radiant Color Tech =====
In 2026, LG introduced "Hyper Radiant Color Tech" as an integrated picture system for its OLED television models. The technology represents the LG OLED latest innovation that focus on brightness, black levels, and reflection-free performance

====== Reflection free premium ======
The system includes features to reduce surface reflection in bright environments. Intertek certified the technology as "Reflection Free Premium" after measuring a reflectance value of less than 0.5% at a 550 nm wavelength. This metric is intended to maintain contrast levels when the display is used in high-ambient-light conditions.

====== Perfect black always ======
"Perfect Black Always" ensures that black levels remain consistent regardless of the surrounding brightness. UL Solutions verified that the displays maintain black levels below 0.24 nits while exposed to 500 lux of ambient light, following the IDMS 11.5 measurement standards.

====== Perfect color ======
The "Perfect Color" component focuses on color accuracy and volume. The most of 2026 OLED models support 100% color fidelity and 100% color volume under 500 lux of ambient light. UL verified this performance, noting a color consistency level exceeding 99% as room brightness increases .

====== Brightness booster ======
The "Brightness Booster" feature pairs the alpha 11 AI processor with a Light Boosting Algorithm. This algorithm analyzes individual image frames to apply localized contrast enhancement, which increases the luminance of specific areas to maintain detail visibility across the entire screen.

===== Wallpaper TV =====
In 2026, LG added the OLED evo W6 series to the product line. The model is in the 9 mm-range and is designed for flush wall mounting, with increased thickness for structural rigidity compared to the 2017 version. It uses a separate Zero Connect Box for inputs and hardware processing, which works at a distance of up to 10 m from the display.

LG marketed the system as the world's first "true wireless" TV to transmit 4K video at 165 Hz refresh rates without physical cabling. The W6 series also includes support for multichannel audio and gaming features, such as variable refresh rate (VRR) through NVIDIA G-SYNC and AMD FreeSync Premium.

==== Mitsubishi ====
Lumiotec is the first company in the world developing and selling, since January 2011, mass-produced OLED lighting panels with such brightness and long lifetime. Lumiotec is a joint venture of Mitsubishi Heavy Industries, ROHM, Toppan Printing, and Mitsui & Co. On 1 June 2011, Mitsubishi Electric installed a 6-meter OLED 'sphere' in Tokyo's Science Museum.

==== Recom Group ====
On 6 January 2011, Los Angeles-based technology company Recom Group introduced the first small screen consumer application of the OLED at the Consumer Electronics Show in Las Vegas. This was a 2.8" (7 cm) OLED display being used as a wearable video name tag. At the Consumer Electronics Show in 2012, Recom Group introduced the world's first video mic flag incorporating three 2.8" (7 cm) OLED displays on a standard broadcaster's mic flag. The video mic flag allowed video content and advertising to be shown on a broadcasters standard mic flag.

==== Dell ====
On 6 January 2016, Dell announced the Ultrasharp UP3017Q OLED monitor at the Consumer Electronics Show in Las Vegas. The monitor was announced to feature a 30-inch (76 cm) 4K UHD OLED panel with a 120 Hz refresh rate, 0.1 millisecond response time, and a contrast ratio of 400,000:1. The monitor was set to sell at a price of $4,999 and release in March, 2016, just a few months later. As the end of March rolled around, the monitor was not released to the market and Dell did not speak on reasons for the delay. Reports suggested that Dell canceled the monitor as the company was unhappy with the image quality of the OLED panel, especially the amount of color drift that it displayed when viewed from the sides. On 13 April 2017, Dell finally released the UP3017Q OLED monitor to the market at a price of $3,499 ($1,500 less than its original spoken price of $4,999 at CES 2016). In addition to the price drop, the monitor featured a 60 Hz refresh rate and a contrast ratio of 1,000,000:1. As of June, 2017, the monitor is no longer available to purchase from Dell's website.

==== Apple ====
Apple began using OLED panels in its watches in 2015 and in its laptops in 2016 with the introduction of an OLED touchbar to the MacBook Pro. In 2017, Apple announced the introduction of their tenth anniversary iPhone X with their own optimized OLED display licensed from Universal Display Corporation. With the exception of the iPhone SE line, iPhone XR and iPhone 11, all iPhones released since then have also featured OLED displays. In 2024, Apple announced the 7th generation iPad Pro, which featured a "tandem OLED" panel in an attempt to increase the panel's brightness.

==== Nintendo ====
A third model of Nintendo's Switch, a hybrid gaming system, features an OLED panel in place of the original model's LCD panel. Announced in the summer of 2021, it was released on 8 October 2021.

=== Miscellaneous Applications ===
==== Chemo sensors ====
OLEDs have been found to be able to detect oxygen, hydrocarbons, immunoassays, and glucose through fluoresce and light emittance. Oxygen detection through OLEDs is done by photoluminescence, electroluminescence, and a photodetector. The sensor film is placed on one side of a substrate, and on the other side a transparent anode is placed above it. On top of that organic layers, and then finally, a cathode is placed to complete the sensor. A dye is placed to detect the light intensity at a specific wavelength. This dye often can quench the oxygen present allowing for a change in intensity being detected by the photodetector, which is above the cathode. The hydrocarbon sensors work for aliphatic hydrocarbons, most commonly methanol and ethanol. In a similar set up to the oxygen sensing devices, the OLEDs allow for a light to be emitted that can be linearly related to the light intensity detected by a photodetector. Immunosensors detect the presence of immunoassays through having the photoluminescence diminish as more antibodies interact with the sensor. The glucose sensors detect the presence of glucose in the blood by detecting the presence of the glucose oxidase with the oxygen detection methods above, as well as adding multiple fluorescent dyes, an indicator dye and a references dye that are both oxygen sensitive. Another method would be detecting the glucose oxide byproducts.

==== Night Vision ====
OLEDs have also been used to improve upon night vision goggles. The near infrared light that is converted into a light that is visible to a user through a screen can be improved upon with the implementation of OLED screens. In 2024, a lab at the University of Michigan used OLED screens to make the goggles less bulky. Typically night vision goggles work at a 1:1 ratio of number of photons in to number of photons emitted, but this new development allows for an increased ratio of 1 photon in to 5 photons emitted. This is because the screen being less than 1 micron thick can allow for the OLED screen layers to be stacked, leading to a higher output.

== Research ==
Research into white organic light-emitting diodes began before their use in OLED televisions. In 1995, Junji Kido, Masato Kimura and Katsutoshi Nagai described a multilayer white organic electroluminescent device. Later white OLED research examined device structures, efficiency, colour quality and light extraction.

A display-oriented white OLED with colour filters was demonstrated by Eastman Kodak and Sanyo Electric in 2002. Unlike earlier OLED prototypes from Toshiba and Sony, which used red, green and blue electroluminescent dots, the Kodak and Sanyo prototype used light from a white electroluminescent layer passed through colour filters.

LG Display’s WRGB OLED television work combined oxide thin-film transistor backplanes, white OLED emission, solid-phase encapsulation and compensation technologies for large-sized OLED display production.

In 2014, Mitsubishi Chemical Corporation (MCC), a subsidiary of Mitsubishi Chemical Holdings, developed an OLED panel with a 30,000-hour life, twice that of conventional OLED panels.

The search for efficient OLED materials has been extensively supported by simulation methods; it is possible to calculate important properties computationally, independent of experimental input, making materials development cheaper.

On 18 October 2018, Samsung showed of their research roadmap at their 2018 Samsung OLED Forum. This included Fingerprint on Display (FoD), Under Panel Sensor (UPS), Haptic on Display (HoD) and Sound on Display (SoD).

Various venders are also researching cameras under OLEDs (Under Display Cameras). According to IHS Markit Huawei has partnered with BOE, Oppo with China Star Optoelectronics Technology (CSOT), Xiaomi with Visionox.

In 2020, researchers at the Queensland University of Technology (QUT) proposed using human hair which is a source of carbon and nitrogen to create OLED displays.

In 2025, researchers from the University of Turku and Cornell University developed a model showing that polariton OLEDs could dramatically improve efficiency. By leveraging hybrid light-matter states, polariton OLEDs could increase dark-to-bright state conversion by up to 10 million times. The breakthrough demonstrated the potential of single-molecule strong coupling, though large-scale application would remain challenging due to the need for new device architectures or molecules.

== See also ==
- Comparison of display technology
- Field-emission display – Flat panel display technology
- Flat-panel display – Electronic display technology
- Flexible electronics – Mounting of electronic devices on flexible plastic substrates
- Flexible organic light-emitting diode
- List of emerging technologies
- List of flat panel display manufacturers
- Molecular electronics – Branch of chemistry and electronics
- Organic light-emitting transistor – Form of transistor that emits light
- Printed electronics – Electronic devices created by various printing methods
- Quantum dot display – Type of display device
- Roll-to-roll processing – Electronic device manufacturing process
- Light-on-dark color scheme – Type of color scheme (Dark Mode)
- Surface-conduction electron-emitter display – CRT screen
- LED display
- microLED
- Thin-film transistor (TFT)
- Mini LED
