= ZEN V =

Portable media player

ZEN V / ZEN V Plus
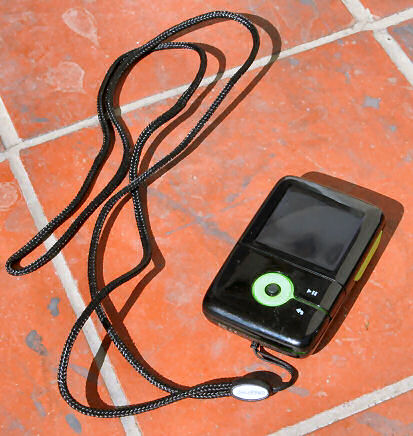
- Manufacturer: Creative Technology
- Product family: Creative Zen
- Type: Digital audio player
- Lifespan: 2006–2008
- Media: Available in 1, 2, 4, 8, 16 GB sizes
- Operating system: ZEN UI
- System on a chip: SigmaTel STMP3600
- Display: 1.5-inch OLED display
- Input: Multi-directional joystick, play and back buttons, power/hold switch, dedicated volume control buttons
- Connectivity: USB 2.0

The ZEN V and the ZEN V Plus are portable media players manufactured by Creative Technology. The user interface on this player, the same as the one on Creative's ZEN Vision:M, was patented by Creative on January 9, 2005. Creative sued Apple over the use of this user interface; Apple later settled for $100 million.

They are very small sized and feature an OLED screen measuring 1.5 inches. It is controlled using a 5-way mini joystick. The ZEN V Plus has accumulated many awards, including CNET Editor's Choice for June 2006. The players are nearly identical save for video playback and FM radio, which the ZEN V Plus supports but the regular ZEN V does not.

In August 2007, Creative introduced a 16 GB version of the ZEN V Plus, making it the first flash-based player with that capacity.

== See also ==
- Creative ZEN
- Creative Technology
