= Phosphorescent organic light-emitting diode =

Phosphorescent organic light-emitting diodes (PHOLED) are a type of organic light-emitting diode (OLED) that use the principle of phosphorescence to obtain higher internal efficiencies than fluorescent OLEDs. This technology is currently under development by many industrial and academic research groups.

== Method of operation ==
Ir(mppy)_{3}, an example of a phosphorescent dopant which emits green light.

Like all types of OLED, phosphorescent OLEDs emit light due to the electroluminescence of an organic semiconductor layer in an electric current. Electrons and holes are injected into the organic layer at the electrodes and form excitons, a bound state of the electron and hole.

Electrons and holes are both fermions with half integer spin. An exciton is formed by the coulombic attraction between the electron and the hole, and it may either be in a singlet state or a triplet state, depending on the spin states of these two bound species. Statistically, there is a 25% probability of forming a singlet state and 75% probability of forming a triplet state. Decay of the excitons results in the production of light through spontaneous emission.

In OLEDs using fluorescent organic molecules only, the decay of triplet excitons is quantum mechanically forbidden by selection rules, meaning that the lifetime of triplet excitons is long and phosphorescence is not readily observed. Hence it would be expected that in fluorescent OLEDs only the formation of singlet excitons results in the emission of useful radiation, placing a theoretical limit on the internal quantum efficiency (the percentage of excitons formed that result in emission of a photon) of 25%.

However, phosphorescent OLEDs generate light from both triplet and singlet excitons, allowing the internal quantum efficiency of such devices to reach nearly 100%.

This is commonly achieved by doping a host molecule with an organometallic complex. These contain a heavy metal atom at the centre of the molecule, for example platinum or iridium, of which the green emitting complex Ir(mppy)_{3} is just one of many examples. The large spin–orbit interaction experienced by the molecule due to this heavy metal atom facilitates intersystem crossing, a process which mixes the singlet and triplet character of excited states. This reduces the lifetime of the triplet state, therefore phosphorescence is readily observed.

== Applications ==
Due to their potentially high level of energy efficiency, even when compared to other OLEDs, PHOLEDs are being studied for potential use in large-screen displays such as computer monitors or television screens, as well as general lighting needs. One potential use of PHOLEDs as lighting devices is to cover walls with large area PHOLED light panels. This would allow entire rooms to glow uniformly, rather than require the use of light bulbs which distribute light unequally throughout a room. The United States Department of Energy has recognized the potential for massive energy savings via the use of this technology and therefore has awarded $200,000 USD in contracts to develop PHOLED products for general lighting applications.

== Challenges ==
One problem that currently hampers the widespread adoption of this highly energy efficient technology is that the average lifetimes of red and green PHOLEDs are often tens of thousands of hours longer than those of blue PHOLEDs. This may cause displays to become visually distorted much sooner than would be acceptable for a commercially viable device.
