= Clar's rule =

Empirical rule used in organic chemistry

In organic and physical organic chemistry, Clar's rule is an empirical rule that relates the chemical stability of a molecule to its aromaticity. It was introduced in 1972 by the Austrian organic chemist Erich Clar in his book The Aromatic Sextet. The rule states that given a polycyclic aromatic hydrocarbon, the resonance structure most important to characterize its properties is that with the largest number of aromatic π-sextets i.e. benzene-like moieties.

== The rule ==
In general, the chemical structure of a given polycyclic aromatic hydrocarbon allows more than one resonance structure: these are sometimes referred to as Kekulé resonance structures. Some such structures may contain aromatic π-sextets, namely groups of six π-electrons localized in a benzene-like moiety and separated by adjacent rings through C–C bonds. An aromatic π-sextet can be represented by a circle, as in the case of the anthracene molecule (below). Clar's rule states that for a benzenoid polycyclic aromatic hydrocarbon (i.e. one with only hexagonal rings), the resonance structure with the largest number of disjoint aromatic π-sextets is the most important to characterize its chemical and physical properties. Such a resonance structure is called a Clar structure. In other words, a polycyclic aromatic hydrocarbon with a given number of π-sextets is more stable than its isomers with fewer π-sextets. In 1984, Glidewell and Lloyd provided an extension of Clar's rule to polycyclic aromatic hydrocarbons containing rings of any size. More recently, Clar's rule was further extended to diradicaloids in their singlet state.

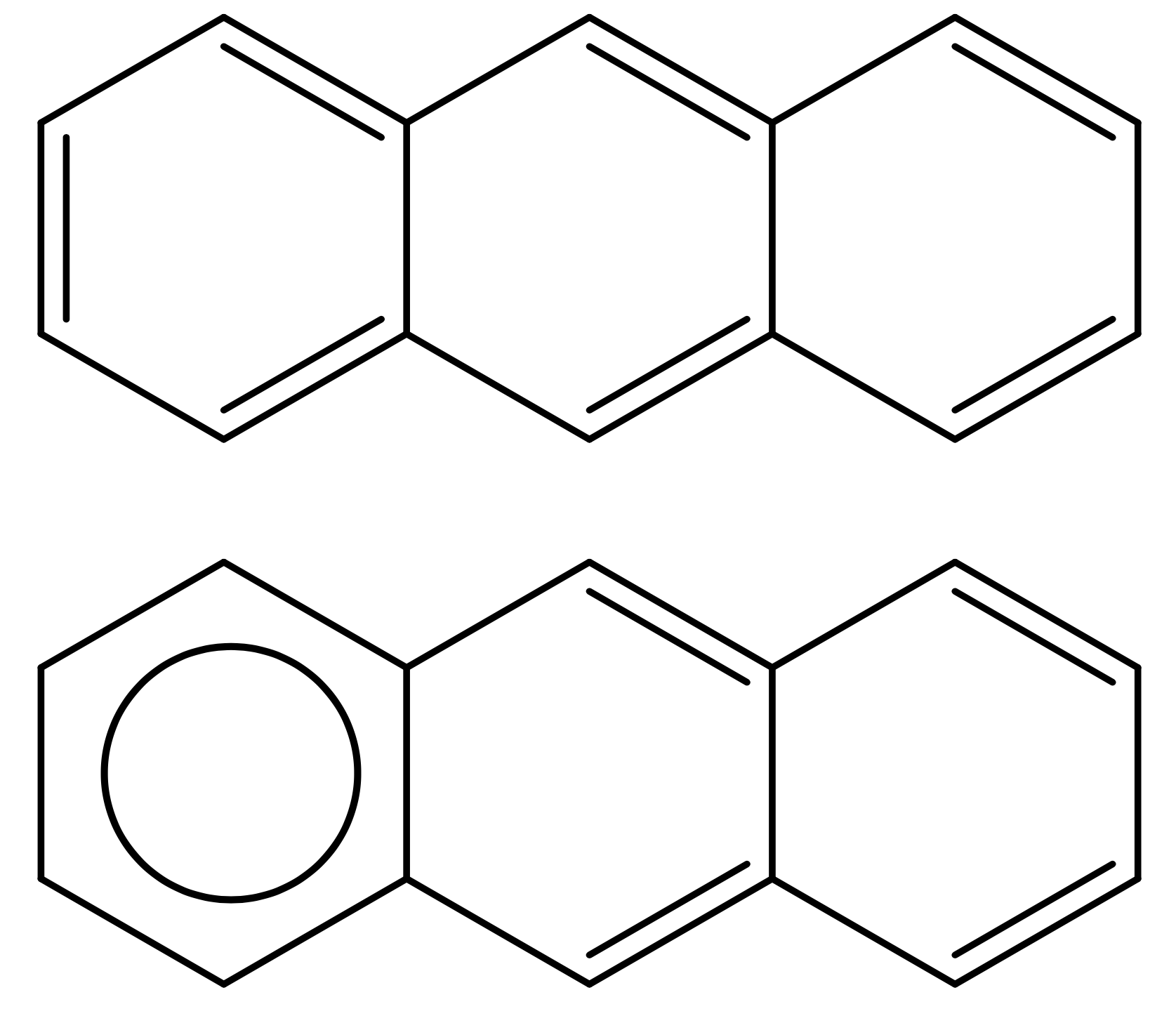
Two representations of the same resonance structure of anthracene. Above, each covalent bond between carbon atoms is represented by one or two segments. Below, the aromatic π-sextet is put in evidence by means of a circle.

=== Drawing a Clar structure ===
When drawing a Clar structure, the following rules must be satisfied:

1. each vertex of the molecular graph representing the polycyclic aromatic hydrocarbon either belongs to a double bond or a circle;
2. such double bonds and circles never join;
3. there are no rings with three double bonds, since they are always represented by circles; moreover, the number of circles in the graph is maximized;
4. when a ring with a circle is adjacent to a ring with two double bonds, an arrow is drawn from the former to the latter ring.

Some results from these rules are worth being made explicit. Following Clar, rules 1 and 2 imply that circles can never be in adjacent rings. Rule 3 means that only four options are viable for rings, namely (i) having only one double bond, (ii) having two double bonds, (iii) having a circle, or (iv) being empty, i.e. having no double bonds. Finally, the arrow mentioned in rule 4 can be interpreted in terms of mobility of π-sextets (in this case, we speak of migrating π-sextets) or, equivalently, of a quantum-mechanical resonance between different Clar structures.

== Examples ==
=== The resonance structures of phenanthrene ===
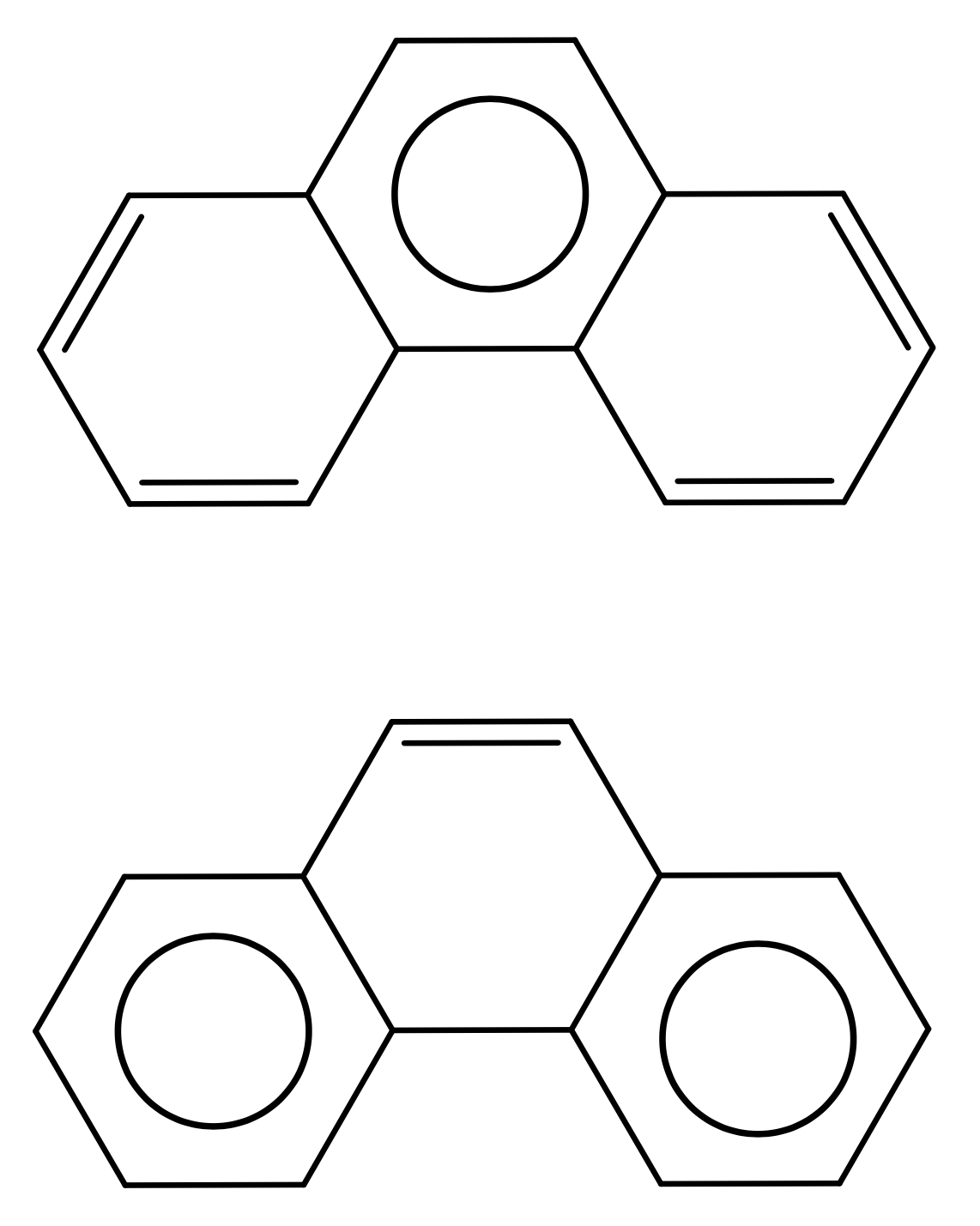
Two resonance structures of phenanthrene: above, one with only one circle; below, one with two circles, which is also a Clar's structure. Clar's rule states that the latter structure contributes the most to the properties of phenanthrene.

According to the rules expressed above, the phenanthrene molecule allows two different resonance structures: one of them presents a single circle in the center of the molecule, with each of the two adjacent rings having two double bonds; the other one has the two peripheral rings each with one circle, and the central ring with one double bond. According to Clar's rule, this last resonance structure gives the most important contribution to the determination of the properties of phenanthrene.

=== The migrating π-sextet of anthracene ===
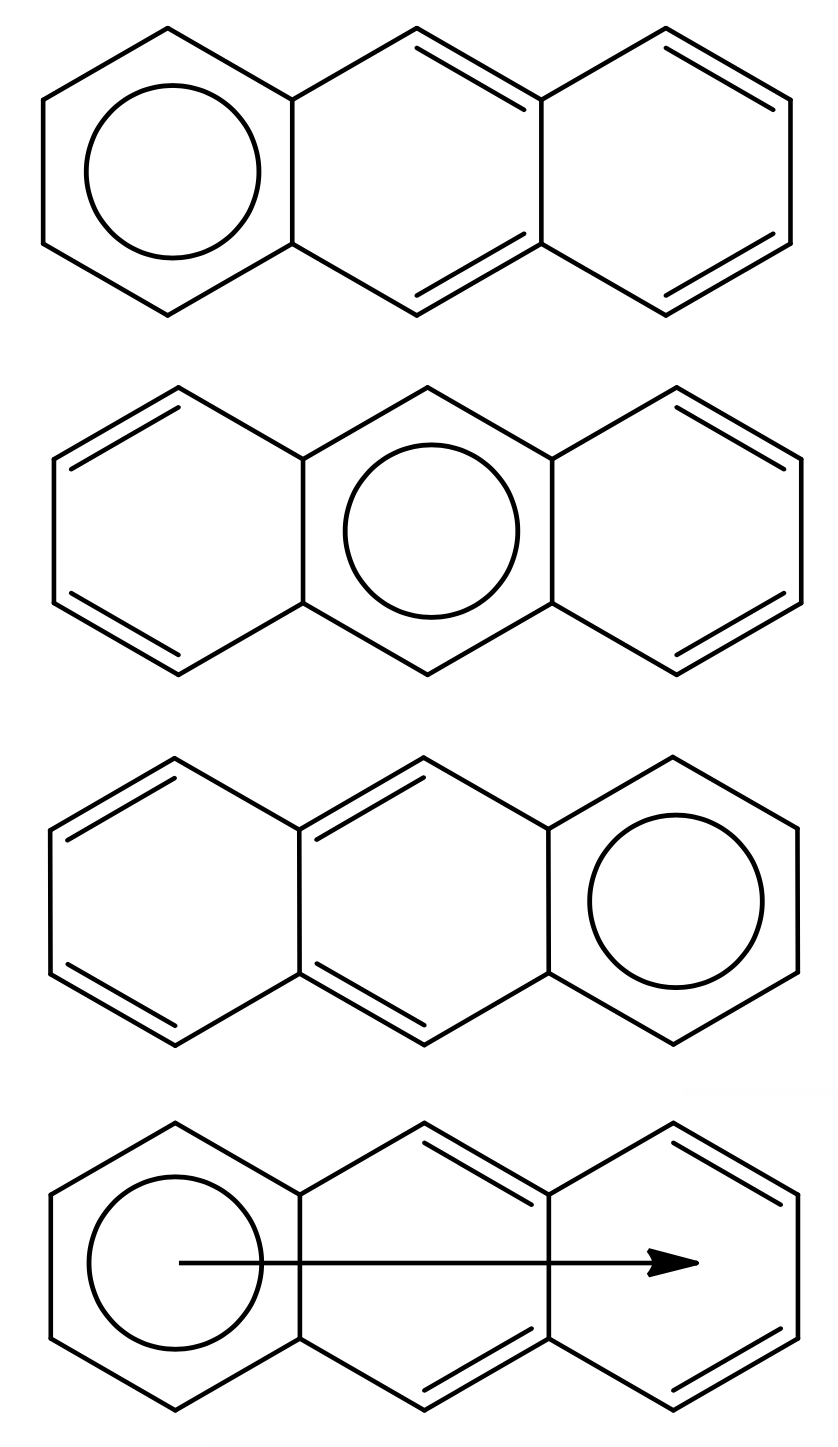
Representation of the anthracene molecule: above, three equivalent resonance structures; below, its Clar structure, with the arrow denoting a migrating π-sextet.

The anthracene molecule allows three resonance structures, each with a circle in one ring and two sets of double bonds in the other two. Following rule 4 above, anthracene is better described by a superposition of these three equivalent structures, and an arrow is drawn to indicate the presence of a migrating π-sextet. Following the same line of reasoning, one can find migrating π-sextets in other molecules of the acene series, such as tetracene, pentacene, and hexacene.

=== The role of angular rings ===
Fusing angular rings around a benzene moiety leads to an increase in stability. The Clar structure of anthracene, for instance, has only one π-sextet but, by moving one ring into the angular position, phenanthrene is obtained, the Clar structure of which carries two circles instead of one. Phenanthrene can be thought of as a benzene moiety with two fused rings; a third ring can be fused to obtain triphenylene, with three aromatic π-sextets in its Clar structure. The chemical stability of these molecules is greatly influenced by the degree of aromaticity of their Clar structures. As a result, while anthracene reacts with maleic acid, phenanthrene does not, and triphenylene is the most stable species of these three.

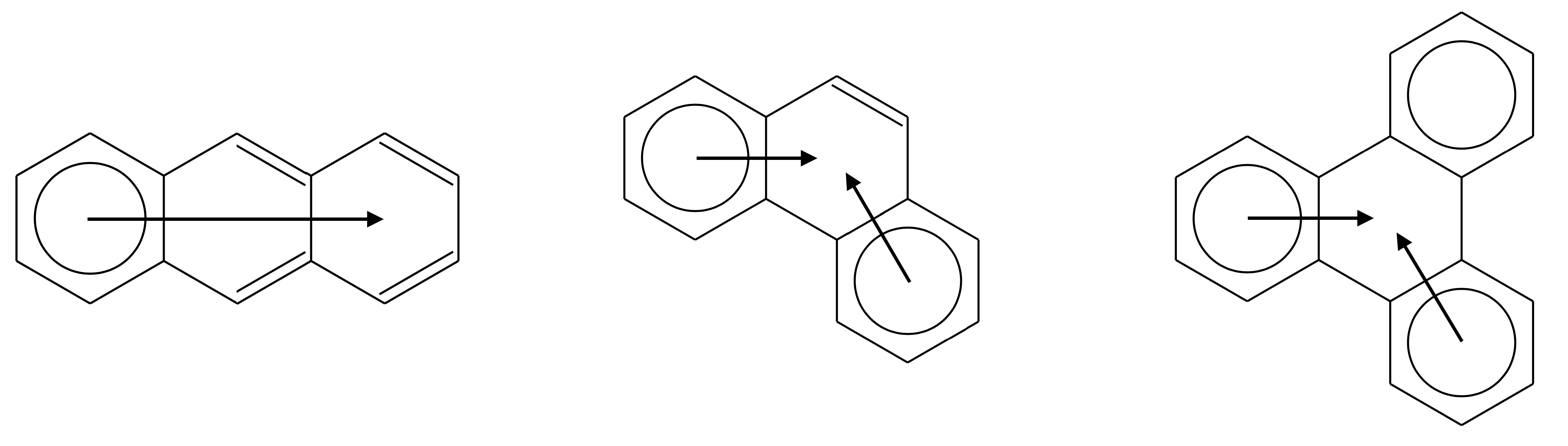
Three Clar structures with an increasing number of π-sextets: anthracene (on the left), phenanthrene (in the middle), and triphenylene (on the right). The chemical stability of these compounds increases from left to right due to the increase in the number of π-sextets.

== Experimental evidence and applications ==
Since its formal statement in 1972, Clar's rule has been supported by a vast amount of experimental evidence. The dependence of the color and reactivity of some small polycyclic aromatic hydrocarbons on the number of π-sextets in their structures was reported by Clar himself in his seminal contribution. Similarly, it was shown that the HOMO–LUMO gap, and therefore the color, of a series of heptacatafusenes depends on the number of π-sextets. Clar's rule has also been supported by experimental results about the distribution of π-electrons in polycyclic aromatic hydrocarbons, valence bond calculations, and nucleus-independent chemical shift studies.

Clar's rule is widely applied in the fields of chemistry and materials science. For instance, Clar's rule can be used to predict several properties of graphene nanoribbons. Aromatic π-sextets play an important part in the determination of the ground state of open shell biradical-type structures., Clar's rule can rationalize the observed decrease in the bandgap of holey graphenes with increasing size.

== Limitations ==
Despite the experimental support mentioned above, Clar's rule suffers from some limitations. In the first place, Clar's rule is formulated only for species with hexagonal rings, and thus it cannot be applied to species having rings different from the benzene moiety, even though an extension of the rule to molecules with rings of any dimension has been provided by Glidewell and Lloyd. Secondly, if more than one Clar structure exists for a given species, Clar's rule does not provide for a comparison of the relative importance of each structure in the determination of the physicochemical properties. Finally, it is important to mention that exceptions to the Clar's rule exist, such as in the case of triangulenes.

== See also ==
- Hückel's rule
- Baird's rule
