= Boraacenes =

Boron containing acene compounds

9-Boraanthracene

Boraacenes are polycyclic aromatic hydrocarbons containing at least one boron atom. Structurally, they are related to acenes, linearly fused benzene rings. However, the boron atom is electron deficient and may act as a Lewis Acid when compared to carbon. This results in slightly less negative charge within the ring, smaller HOMO–LUMO gaps, as well as differences in redox chemistry when compared to their acene analogues. When incorporated into acenes, Boron maintains the planarity and aromaticity of carbon acenes, while adding an empty p-orbital, which can be utilized for the fine tuning of organic semiconductor band gaps. Due to this empty p orbital, however, it is also highly reactive when exposed to nucleophiles like water or normal atmosphere, as it will readily be attacked by oxygen, which must be addressed to maintain its stability.

== Synthesis ==
Borabenzene

Synthetic strategies to incorporate boron into a polycyclic carbon backbone aim to sterically protect the atom from nucleophilic attack while ensuring that favorable π-stacking interactions are still preserved to ensure electron mobility in the ring and compound stability within organic electronics. Synthesis of boraacenes presents a unique challenge due to boron’s incredible Lewis acidic character. Borabenzene, an analog of benzene, cannot exist independently, despite obeying Huckel’s Rule for aromaticity with 6 π electrons. However, it has been characterized with various neutral and anionic metal complexes that help stabilize boron’s empty p orbital. Interestingly, when synthesized with metal ligands, the compound is quite inert and will usually maintain the metal ligand bond, even towards nucleophiles. Though it has been shown to undergo some Diels-Alder reactions.

=== Boranaphthalene ===
Synthesis of the simplest boraacene, boranaphthalene, was achieved in 1985. This was achieved by reacting benzyldibromoborane and acetylene to form 2-bromo-1,2-dihydro-2-boranaphthalene, which was mixed with diethyl ether to form an ethoxy analogue. This was then deprotonated with the sterically hindered base lithium 2,2,6,6-tetramethylpiperidine, and silylated with chlorotrimethylsilane. The product was reacted with boron trichloride to replace the ethoxy group with chlorine. After this, pyridine was added yielding the final product, pyridine-2-boranaphthalene.

Synthesis of boranaphthalene-pyridine.

=== 9-Boraanthracene ===
An early synthesis of 9-boraanthracene was done by Van Veen and Bickelhaupt in 1974. Magnesium was added to a two-boron containing dibenzene to form a Grignard reagent. Diethylaminoboron was then added to form the initial skeleton, after which, hydrochloric acid was used to convert the product to an anhydride. The anhydride was treated with boron trichloride to cleave the anhydride and form the chloride adduct. Interestingly, the group failed to aromatize this compound with a strong base initially due to the highly Lewis acidic nature of boron, as the base would prefer to attack the boron, forming the adduct, rather than remove the hydrogen across from it, which is necessary to aromatize the compound. However, they introduced a bulky mesityl ligand to the structure via a Grignard reaction which sterically shielded the highly electropositive boron. The stabilized product was then treated with the sterically hindered base, tert-butyllithium in benzene and a stable anionic 9-boraanthracene compound was formed.

Synthesis of anionic 9-boraanthracene with stabilization by a mesityl group.

The first synthesis of neutral 9-boraanthracene was initially reported by in 2009. When compared to the 1974 synthesis of a charged boraanthracene, the boron is uncharged and the carbon opposite it is not as Lewis Basic. The neutral molecule was achieved by transmetalation of silicon, as opposed to a Grignard Reaction. A silicon containing, tricyclic stannacycle is reacted with excess boron trichloride followed by the addition of H_{2}IMes, an N-heterocyclic carbene (NHC), to stabilize the product. Following this, lithium 2,2,6,6-tetramethylpiperidine was used to deprotonate it and form the fully aromatic, neutral 9-boraanthracene, in a similar manner to Van Veen.

Synthesis of neutral 9-boraanthracene with stabilization by an NHC ligand.

=== Higher Order Boraacenes ===
The above technique was expanded on in later studies, and created a generalized approach to synthesize 9-boraanthracene, as well as the higher order boraacenes: 5-boranaphthacene and 6-borapentacene. To accomplish this, the structure of the starting stannacycle was altered with the addition of either one or two more flanking benzene rings to synthesize the naphthacene and pentacene boron analogues respectively. The stannacycle used to prepare 9-boraanthracene was prepared by reacting 1,2-dibromobenzene with isopropyl magnesium chloride, and quenching the product with 2-bromobenzaldehyde, in a Grignard reaction. The product was reduced with hydroiodic acid and silylated with dichlorodimethylsilane producing the initial stannacycle.

Synthesis of stannacycle reactants used in the production of 9-boraanthracene.

The stannacycle used for 5-boranaphthacene was synthesized similarly, except the dibromobenzene was substituted with a naphthalene analogue as the Grignard reagent, with the same aldehyde. While the stannacycle used to synthesize 6-borapentacene was synthesized by with a dibromonaphthalene and a naphthalene analogue of the aldehyde. The structures of the molecules used are shown below. Following synthesis of the stannacycles, transmetalation was done utilizing the same reagents to synthesize 9-boraanthracene.

A: Dibromide and aldehyde used to produce B: Tetracyclic stannacycle. C: Dibromonaphthalene and naphthaldehyde used to produce D: Pentacyclic stannacycle

=== 9-Aza-10-boraanthracene ===
More recently, a boron acene analogue containing nitrogen was synthesized via a similar transmetalation and stabilization process, this time utilizing a nitrogen bridge between the two benzene groups instead of a carbon with the product being stabilized by an NHC. Adding a nitrogen opposite the boron allows the nitrogen’s lone pair to contribute to the molecules aromaticity and serves to stabilize the empty p orbital on boron. This was achieved by lithiating the nitrogen containing bromophenyl reactant with n-BuLi, followed by a reaction with boron trichloride. The resulting hydroxide is reacted with one more equivalent of boron trichloride to yield the chlorine adduct. Finally, the NHC was added to stabilize the product.

Synthesis of 9-aza-10-boraanthracene via lithiation and subsequent stabilization with an NHC ligand

== Reactivity ==
=== Charged 9-Boraanthracene as a Lewis Base ===
The anionic 9-boraanthracene has a resonance structure characterized by a lone pair on the carbon opposite boron. This allows for some interesting chemistry where, since the electrophilic boron is protected by the mesityl group, the molecule may act as a nucleophile. Van Veen and Bickelhaupt characterized reaction products with carbon dioxide, trimethylchlorosilane, ethyl chloroformate, iodomethane, formaldehyde, and deuterium oxide. The products formed were racemic mixtures of adducts that were the result of nucleophilic attack by the nucleophilic carbon.

The anionic 9-boraanthracene acting as a Lewis Base. Adducts include: carbon dioxide, trimethylchlorosilane, ethyl chloroformate, iodomethane, formaldehyde, and heavy water.

One other interesting reaction they noted was a ring expansion that occurred when formaldehyde was added and the reaction was allowed to proceed at reflux instead of room temperature.

Ring expansion reaction of charged 9-boraanthracene with formaldehyde at reflux.

=== Photochemical Reactions of Diazoboraanthracene ===
The non-aromatic precursor developed by Van Veen was characterized in several reactions developing novel products. One such reaction was with tosyl azide in diethylamine to yield an aromatic diazo product. By irradiating the diazo product in benzene and adding various substituted alkenes, they were able to isolate molecules with cyclopropane adducts to the nucleophilic carbon.

Photochemical addition of alkenes to diazoboraanthracene forming cyclopropane adducts.

A similar irradiation method, but with cyclohexane lead to the rapid formation of a cyclohexane adduct in a manner similar to the Lewis acid mechanism demonstrated by Van Veen, but it also formed dimers as well as regenerated the starting material.

Photochemical addition of cyclohexane to diazoboraanthracene.

=== Endoperoxide Formation ===
3D Structure of the boraanthracene endoperoxide adduct

Owing to boron’s Lewis acidic nature, in the presence of molecular oxygen, the neutral 9-boranthracene rapidly forms a peroxide. This reaction occurs quickly and spontaneously, without any energy input. A similar reaction occurs in anthracene; however, the oxygen has to be excited with a photosensitizer from its triplet state to its singlet state, and the reactions are significantly slower than its boraacenes analogue. Due to this reaction, the product must be kept under inert conditions so that it does not react with oxygen in the air.

Endoperoxide formation from exposure to molecular oxygen

=== 9-Aza-10-boranthracene ===
Along with the NHC ligand, 9-aza-10-boranthracene, many aryl and alkyl groups could be introduced as a stabilizing ligand. Ishikawa et al demonstrated that mesityl, 1,3,5-trichlorophenyl, trifluoromethylphenyl, 1,3-Bis(trifluoromethyl)phenyl, anthracenyl, and ethyl could be used in place of the NHC ligand. Furthermore, the lone pair on nitrogen can act as a Lewis Base and form adducts with alkyl halides. The compound overall is highly reactive to air and needs to be stored under inert atmosphere.

== Properties ==
=== Neutral Boraacenes ===
For the boraacenes possessing an NHC ligand, the peak absorption of 9-boraanthracene, 5-boranaphthacene, and 6-borapentacene is 485 nm, 608 nm, and 800 nm respectively. While the anthracene and naphthacene analogues are weakly fluorescent, the pentacene analogue is not. The HOMO-LUMO gaps are 2.25, 1.74, and 1.28 eV respectively, which are smaller overall when compared to the carbon acene’s gaps, however the boron HOMO and LUMO energies, individually, are higher. This gap is associated with a lower LUMO energy rather than a higher HOMO energy, as each boron compound has a relatively similar HOMO energy. 9-boraanthracene and 5-boranaphthacene are irreversibly oxidized by cyclic voltammetry while 6-borapentacene is quasi-irreversibly oxidized. This essentially qualitatively characterizes the kinetics of the redox reaction, so the boron containing anthracene and naphthacene undergo a slow electron transfer rate, while the pentacene has a faster electron transfer rate, but not fast enough to be classified as reversible. For comparison, their carbon analogues are reversibly oxidized.

=== 9-Aza-10-boranthracene ===
9-aza-10-boraanthracene has peak absorption around 427 nm and broad emission around 513 nm, with HOMO-LUMO gap of 3.075 eV, again the individual HOMO and LUMO energies are higher than anthracene, with an overall lower band gap.

=== Boranaphthalene ===
As a consequence of its instability in solution, its charge transfer band of electrons going from the HOMO of the boraacene to the LUMO of pyridine could only be estimated at 486 nm.

== Applications ==
Boron containing polycyclic aromatic compounds are particularly important in organic electronics. The ability to easily manipulate their absorption and emission wavelengths, as well as the conjugated system’s HOMO and LUMO, through the addition and removal of boron makes them likely candidates for organic semiconductors, utilized in light sensitive systems like photovoltaic cells and light emitting diodes. If boron is introduced into graphene it has also been shown to convert it from a semi-metal to a half-metal, giving it properties more akin to a semiconductor.

Due to its incredibly fast reaction with molecular oxygen, even in darkness at room temperature, Wood et al have proposed that 9-boraanthracene could be used as a highly sensitive oxygen sensor. Current oxygen sensors are used in medicine as well as for environmental precautions. However, they do need to be highly specific and stable, sometimes for temperatures up to 1000°C. While 9-boraanthracene will react with oxygen rapidly, it will also react with any water present, and 9-boraanthracene will break down at high temperatures, which would need to be considered when utilizing it as an oxygen sensor.

The emissive properties of 9-aza-10-boraanthracene also may have potential use as an optical anion sensor. Useful fluorescent anion sensors will generate sensitive, and selective variance in fluorescence in response to specific anions. This is so it can be determined if the analyte is present, what it is specifically, and how much of it there is. Bis-(dimesitylboryl)-azaborine, a boron nitrogen aromatic compound similar in structure to 9-aza-10-boraanthracene, was shown to fluoresce at a specific wavelength in its native state. However, when fluoride ions were bound to it, the compound fluoresces in a different color, which can be useful for a simple optical anion sensor, without lab quality fluorescence detection. This was also shown to occur with cyanide ions, which means it could be utilized to detect anionic poisons in possibly hazardous areas.
