= Nonacene =

- Skeletal formula of nonacene

Names
- Preferred IUPAC name Nonacene

Identifiers
3D model (JSmol)	Interactive image
ChEBI	CHEBI:33170
ChemSpider	5256923
PubChem CID	6857587
- InChI: InChI=1S/C38H22/c1-2-6-24-10-28-14-32-18-36-22-38-20-34-16-30-12-26-8-4-3-7-25(26)11-29(30)15-33(34)19-37(38)21-35(36)17-31(32)13-27(28)9-23(24)5-1/h1-22H Key: UIFXPOUSHBMMEG-UHFFFAOYSA-N
- SMILES: C1=CC=C2C=C3C=C4C=C5C=C6C=C7C=C8C=C9C=CC=CC9=CC8=CC7=CC6=CC5=CC4=CC3=CC2=C1

Properties
Chemical formula	C_{38}H_{22}
Molar mass	478.594 g·mol^{−1}
- Except where otherwise noted, data are given for materials in their standard state (at 25 °C [77 °F], 100 kPa). Infobox references

Nonacene is an organic compound and a polycyclic aromatic hydrocarbon and the ninth member of the acene or polyacene family of linear fused benzene rings. Its chemical formula is C_{38}H_{22}.

== Structure ==
Like other acenes, nonacene features a planar, rectilinear arrangement of nine fused benzene rings. This extended π-conjugated system gives rise to its characteristic electronic properties.

As the number of fused benzene rings increases, the energy gap between the highest occupied molecular orbital (HOMO) and the lowest unoccupied molecular orbital (LUMO) decreases. For nonacene, this gap is significantly smaller than that of smaller acenes such as pentacene (five rings) or tetracene (four rings), positioning it as a potential low-bandgap semiconductor.

== Synthesis ==
In 2010, the Bettinger group reported a photochemical synthesis of octacene and nonacene, utilizing a cryogenic matrix-isolation technique to stabilize these highly reactive acenes. This approach requires precursors containing a double α-diketone bridge to enable the formation of octacene and nonacene.

== Uses ==
Nonacene is of significant interest in organic electronics due to its exceptional semiconductor properties, though its high chemical reactivity and instability have historically made it one of the most challenging acenes to synthesize and isolate.
