= Singlet fission =

Molecular photophysics selection rule

Singlet fission is a spin-allowed process in molecular photophysics that converts one singlet excited state into two triplet states. It occurs in molecular crystals, aggregates, disordered thin films, and covalently linked dimers, where chromophores align to enhance electronic coupling between the singlet and double triplet states. The process, faster than light emission (picoseconds or femtoseconds versus nanoseconds), achieves high efficiency by outcompeting slower decay pathways. Unlike intersystem crossing, singlet fission avoids spin flipping, coupling two triplets into an overall singlet. It could boost solar cell efficiencies in organic photovoltaics. In 2025, researchers integrated stable singlet fission molecules with silicon, potentially increasing solar cell efficiency by over 10% by generating two electron-hole pairs per high-energy photon.

== History ==
Singlet fission was first described in 1965 for anthracene photophysics. Studies on magnetic field effects in tetracene fluorescence solidified its role in polyacenes. Pentacene and tetracene, where the singlet state energy (S_{1}) is at least twice the triplet state energy (T_{1}), are key candidates. Experiments confirmed singlet fission in functionalized pentacene and covalently linked dimers. Studies in 2025 explored singlet fission in non-fullerene acceptors, enhancing organic solar cell performance by up to 15% through optimized molecular packing.

== Mechanisms ==
Singlet fission converts a singlet excited state (S_{1}) into two triplet states (T_{1}) via a two-step process (see Figure 1): 1. A singlet state forms a correlated triplet pair state: S_{1} + S_{0} → ^{1}(T_{1}T_{1}). 2. The triplet pair separates into individual triplets: ^{1}(T_{1}T_{1}) → T_{1} + T_{1}. The rate, k_{SF}, follows Fermi's Golden Rule: : k_{SF} = (2π/ℏ) | ⟨ ^{1}(T_{1}T_{1}) ∣ H_{el} ∣ S_{1} ⟩ |^{2} d. H_{el} is the electronic coupling Hamiltonian, and d is the density of states, determining efficiency. Two mechanisms dominate: direct molecular coupling or stepwise charge-transfer processes. Molecular orientation and intermolecular interactions critically affect efficiency. In 2025, studies showed that triplet-triplet annihilation in disordered films enhances singlet fission yields by 20% in optimized systems.

Figure 1. Jablonski diagram illustrating singlet fission

== Implications ==
Efficient singlet fission requires a singlet state energy (E(S_{1})) at least twice the triplet state energy (E(T_{1})): E(S_{1}) ≥ 2 × E(T_{1}). Suitable materials include acenes (e.g., tetracene, pentacene), perylene derivatives, and diketopyrrolopyrroles. Crystal structure and molecular packing influence performance. Single-crystal tetracene shows coherent quantum beats, with slower singlet decay (200–300 ps) compared to polycrystalline films (70–90 ps), where defects create "hotspots" enhancing fission. If energetic requirements are unmet, competing pathways like fluorescence or intersystem crossing reduce efficiency.

== Role of spectroscopy ==
Ultrafast time-resolved spectroscopy techniques, such as transient absorption and fluorescence spectroscopy, measure singlet exciton decay and triplet state formation. Transient absorption tracks rapid singlet-to-triplet conversion, while fluorescence spectroscopy reveals coherent quantum beats from spin-state interactions. In 2025, two-dimensional electronic spectroscopy improved resolution of triplet pair dynamics, identifying a 30% increase in fission efficiency in aligned molecular films.

== Challenges ==
Limited chromophore diversity hinders practical applications. Computational modeling of diradical character guides new chromophore discovery. Carbenes are promising building blocks. Scaling singlet fission for commercial solar cells requires overcoming material stability and cost barriers.

== Potential applications ==
Singlet fission could enhance organic photovoltaics and light-emitting devices beyond the Shockley–Queisser limit. In 2025, hybrid singlet fission-silicon cells achieved efficiencies up to 32%, surpassing traditional silicon results. Emerging applications include quantum computing, where triplet states enable spin-based qubits.
