= Zethrene =

- Skeletal formula of zethrene

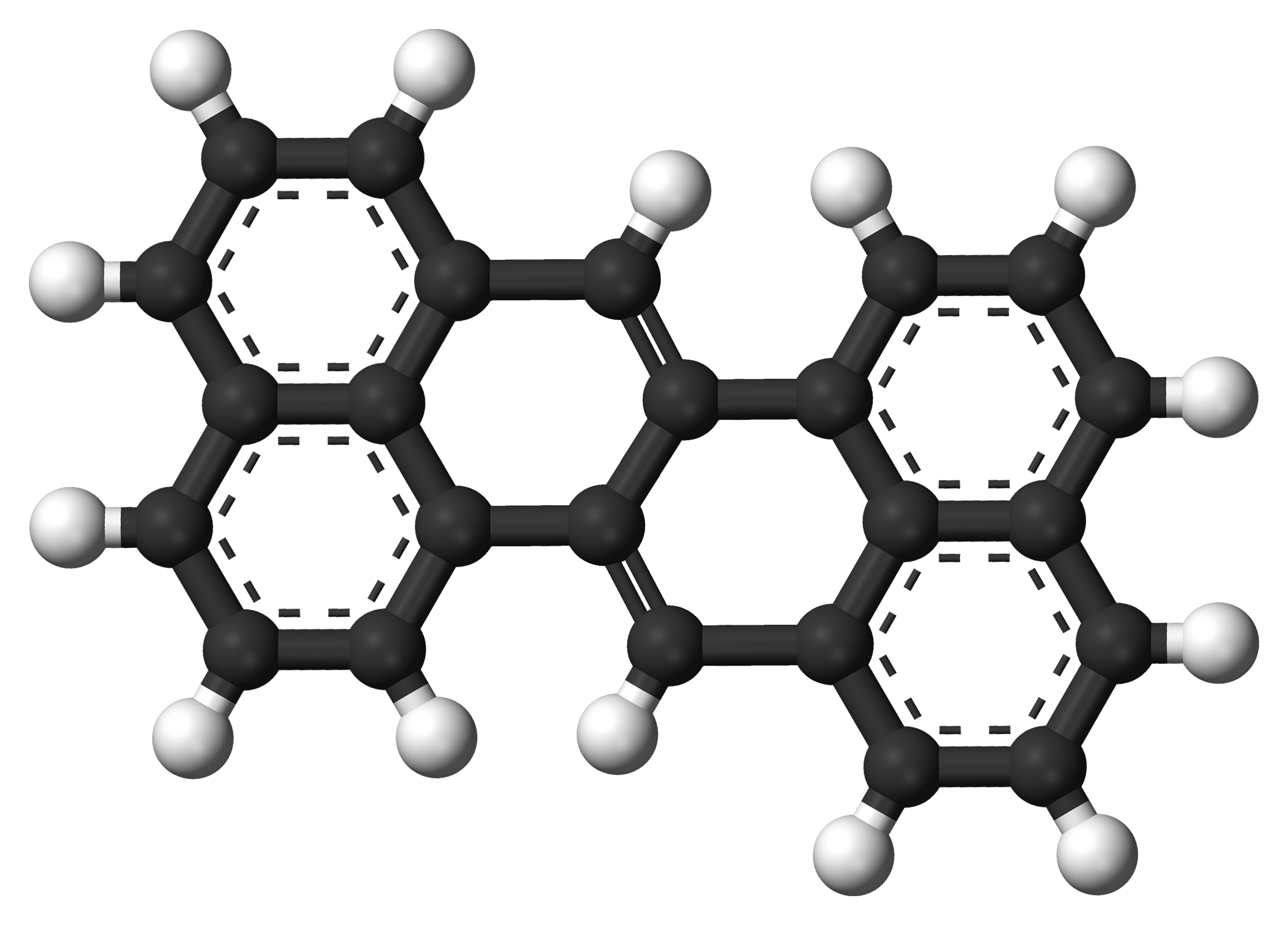
- Ball-and-stick model of zethrene

Names
- Preferred IUPAC name Dibenzo[de,mn]tetracene

Identifiers
CAS Number	214-63-1
3D model (JSmol)	Interactive image
ChemSpider	11562880
PubChem CID	12445035
UNII	6N75LDD37Q
CompTox Dashboard (EPA)	DTXSID40498508
- InChI: InChI=1S/C24H14/c1-5-15-7-3-11-19-22-14-18-10-2-6-16-8-4-12-20(24(16)18)21(22)13-17(9-1)23(15)19/h1-14H Key: UXUXNGMSDNTZEC-UHFFFAOYSA-N
- SMILES: c1ccc3c6c1cccc6\C=C/2\c4cccc5cccc(\C=C\23)c45

Properties
Chemical formula	C_{24}H_{14}
Molar mass	302.376 g·mol^{−1}
- Except where otherwise noted, data are given for materials in their standard state (at 25 °C [77 °F], 100 kPa). Infobox references

Zethrene (dibenzo[de,mn]naphthacene) is a polycyclic aromatic hydrocarbon consisting of two phenalene units fused together. According to Clar's rule, the two exterior naphthalene units are truly aromatic and the two central double bonds are not aromatic at all. For this reason the compound is of some interest to academic research. Zethrene has a deep-red color and it is light sensitive - complete decomposition under a sunlight lamp occurs within 12 hours. The melting point is 262 °C.

== Synthesis ==
The compound was originally synthesized by Erich Clar in 1955 from acenaphthene in one method and from chrysene in another. Mitchell and Sondheimer prepared the compound from a benzannulated [10]annulene.

Zethrene synthesis 1968 Sondheimer

Zethrene synthesis (Sondheimer 1968)

A sulfur extrusion method was reported by Kemp, Storie, and Tulloch. Wu et al. reported the synthesis of the compound in a coupling reaction / dimerization with in-situ desilylation.

Zethrene synthesis Wu 2010

Zethrene synthesis (Wu 2010)

A Heck variation was reported in 2013.

Derivatives are also known.

== Structure ==
X-ray crystallography indicates that zethrene is a planar molecule. The bond lengths in the central part of the molecule are consistent with distinct single and double bonds rather than aromatic components.
