= C24H14 =

The molecular formula C_{24}H_{14} (molar mass: 302.37 g/mol, exact mass: 302.1096 u) may refer to:

- Dibenzopyrenes
- Zethrene, or dibenzo[de,mn]naphthacene
