= C13H10 =

The molecular formula C_{13}H_{10} (molar mass: 166.22 g/mol, exact mass: 166.0783 u) may refer to:

- Fluorene, or 9H-fluorene
- Phenalene
