= Non-Kekulé molecule =

Examples of non-Kekulé (a) polyenes, (b) quinodimethanes, and (c) polynuclear aromatics

A non-Kekulé molecule is a conjugated hydrocarbon that cannot be assigned a classical Kekulé structure.

Since non-Kekulé molecules have two or more formal charges or radical centers, their spin-spin interactions can cause electrical conductivity or ferromagnetism (molecule-based magnets), and applications to functional materials are expected. However, as these molecules are quite reactive and most of them are easily decomposed or polymerized at room temperature, strategies for stabilization are needed for their practical use. Synthesis and observation of these reactive molecules are generally accomplished by matrix-isolation methods.

== Biradicals ==
The simplest non-Kekulé molecules are biradicals. A biradical is an even-electron chemical compound with two free radical centres which act independently of each other. They should not be confused with the more general class of diradicals.

One of the first biradicals was synthesized by Wilhelm Schlenk in 1915 following the same methodology as Moses Gomberg's triphenylmethyl radical. The so-called Schlenk-Brauns hydrocarbons are:

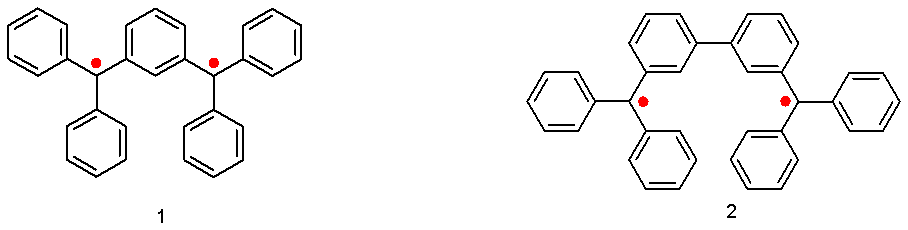
Schlenk-brauns hydrocarbons

Eugene Müller, with the aid of a Gouy balance, established for the first time that these compounds are paramagnetic with a triplet ground state.

Another classic biradical was synthesised by Aleksei Chichibabin in 1907. Other classical examples are the biradicals described by Yang in 1960 and by Coppinger in 1962.

Tschitschibabin biradical (1907)	Yang biradical (1960)	Coppinger biradical (1962)
Tschitschibabin biradical (1907)	Yang biradical (1960)	Coppinger biradical 1962

=== Trimethylenemethane ===
A well studied biradical is trimethylenemethane (TMM), C_{4}H_{6}. In 1966 Paul Dowd determined with electron spin resonance that this compound also has a triplet state. In a crystalline host the 6 hydrogen atoms in TMM are identical.

=== Quinodimethanes and PAHs ===
Other examples of non-Kekulé molecules are the biradicaloid quinodimethanes, that have a six-membered ring with methylene substituents.

Non-Kekulé polynuclear aromatic hydrocarbons are composed of several fused six-membered rings. The simplest member of this class is triangulene. After unsuccessful attempts by Erich Clar in 1953, trioxytriangulene was synthesized by Richard J. Bushby in 1995, and kinetically stabilized triangulene by Kazuhiro Nakasuji in 2001. However, in 2017 a project led by David Fox and Anish Mistry from the University of Warwick in collaboration with IBM synthesized and imaged triangulene. In 2019, larger homologues of triangulene, consisting of ten ([4]triangulene) and fifteen fused six-membered rings ([5]triangulene) were synthesized in 2019. In 2021, synthesis of the hitherto largest triangulene homologue, consisting of twenty-eight fused six-membered rings ([7]triangulene) was achieved. Scanning tunneling microscopy experiments on triangulene spin chains have revealed the clearest proof yet of the existence of Haldane gap and fractional edge states predicted for spin-1 Heisenberg chain. A related class of biradicals are para-benzynes.

Other studied biradicals are those based on pleiadene, extended viologens, corannulenes, nitronyl-nitroxide, bis(phenalenyl)s and teranthenes.

Teranthene biradical	Bisphenalenyl biradical
Teranthene biradical Singlet. max. 3 stabilizing Clar sextets, stable rt, air. 50% biradical, molecular section of graphene	Bisphenalenyl biradical Singlet. max. 6 stabilizing Clar sextets, stable rt, air. 42% biradical

Pleiadene has been synthesised from acenaphthylene and anthranilic acid / amyl nitrite:

Pleiadene generation and dimerization

=== Oxyallyl ===
The oxyallyl diradical (OXA) is a trimethylenemethane molecule with one methylene group replaced by oxygen. This reactive intermediate is postulated to occur in ring opening of cyclopropanones, allene oxides and in the Favorskii rearrangement. The intermediate has been produced by reaction of oxygen radical anions with acetone and studied by photoelectron spectroscopy. The experimental electron affinity of OXA is 1.94 eV.

== Classification ==
NBMOs of non-disjoint (top) and disjoint (bottom) Non-Kekulé molecules

Non-Kekulé molecules with two formal radical centers (non-Kekulé diradicals) can be classified into non-disjoint and disjoint by the shape of their two non-bonding molecular orbitals (NBMOs).

Both NBMOs of molecules with non-disjoint characteristics such as trimethylenemethane have electron density at the same atom. According to Hund's rule, each orbital is filled with one electron with parallel spin, avoiding the Coulomb repulsion by filling one orbital with two electrons. Therefore, such molecules with non-disjoint NBMOs are expected to prefer a triplet ground state.

In contrast, the NBMOs of the molecules with disjoint characteristics such as tetramethyleneethane can be described without having electron density at the same atom. With such MOs, the destabilization factor by the Coulomb repulsion becomes much smaller than with non-disjoint type molecules, and therefore the relative stability of the singlet ground state to the triplet ground state will be nearly equal, or even reversed because of exchange interaction.
