= C34H20 =

The molecular formula C_{34}H_{20} (molar mass: 428.52 g/mol) may refer to:

- 5,12-Bis(phenylethynyl)naphthacene
- Octacene
