= Perfluoropentacene =

Names
- Preferred IUPAC name Tetradecafluoropentacene

Identifiers
CAS Number	646533-88-2
3D model (JSmol)	Interactive image
ChemSpider	21431394
PubChem CID	12143313
UNII	PXZ2S4ZY9P
CompTox Dashboard (EPA)	DTXSID70478479
- InChI: Key: AZVQGIPHTOBHAF-UHFFFAOYSA-N; InChI=1S/C22F14/c23-9-1-2(12(26)6-5(11(1)25)15(29)19(33)20(34)16(6)30)10(24)4-3(9)13(27)7-8(14(4)28)18(32)22(36)21(35)17(7)31
- SMILES: c12c(c(c3c(c1F)c(c4c(c3F)c(c(c(c4F)F)F)F)F)F)c(c5c(c2F)c(c(c(c5F)F)F)F)F

Properties
Chemical formula	C_{22}F_{14}
Molar mass	530.220 g·mol^{−1}
Appearance	Dark blueish powder
- Except where otherwise noted, data are given for materials in their standard state (at 25 °C [77 °F], 100 kPa). verify (what is ?) Infobox references

Perfluoropentacene (PFP) is an n-type organic semiconductor, which is made by fluorination of the p-type semiconductor pentacene. It has a blueish-black color, and is used for molecular thin-film devices (like OLEDs or OFETs).
