= Phenacene =

Group of chemical compounds

Phenacenes are a class of organic compounds consisting of fused aromatic rings. They are polycyclic aromatic hydrocarbons, related to acenes and helicenes from which they differ by the arrangement of the fused rings.

[n]Phenacene	Common name	Molecular formula	Structural formula
[3]Phenacene	Phenanthrene	C_{14}H_{10}	
[4]Phenacene	Chrysene	C_{18}H_{12}	
[5]Phenacene	Picene	C_{22}H_{14}	
[6]Phenacene	Fulminene	C_{26}H_{16}	
[7]Phenacene		C_{30}H_{18}	

== Relevance to organic electronic materials ==
Aromatic compounds with extended π-conjugated system have attracted attention because of their potential use in organic electronics as organic semiconductors. Of academic interest, pentacene has been widely used as an active layer in organic thin-film field-effect transistors (OFET). The main drawback of pentacene OFET is degradation upon exposure to light and air. On the other hand, [n]phenacenes, an isomeric form of [n]acenes, has been known as a stable compound in which the benzene rings are fused in a zigzag structure. For the past several years, there is renewed interest in synthesis of [n]phenacene derivatives associated with electronic applications in emissive and semi- or superconducting materials.

Picene ([5]phenacene) can serve as an active layer of a high-performance p-channel organic thin-film FET with very high field-effect mobility μ = 5 cm^{2}/(V⋅s). [7]Phenacene FET shows μ = 0.75 cm^{2}/(V⋅s) and no sensitivity to air. Furthermore, picene doped with potassium and rubidium exhibit superconductivity with a maximum critical temperature T_{C} ≈ 18 K. Thus, [n]phenacenes and their derivatives may play an important role in future fabrication of stable and high-performance electronic devices such as OFET, OLED and organic solar cells. Substituted picenes may serve as an active layer of OFETs.
