= Helicene =

Class of chemical compounds

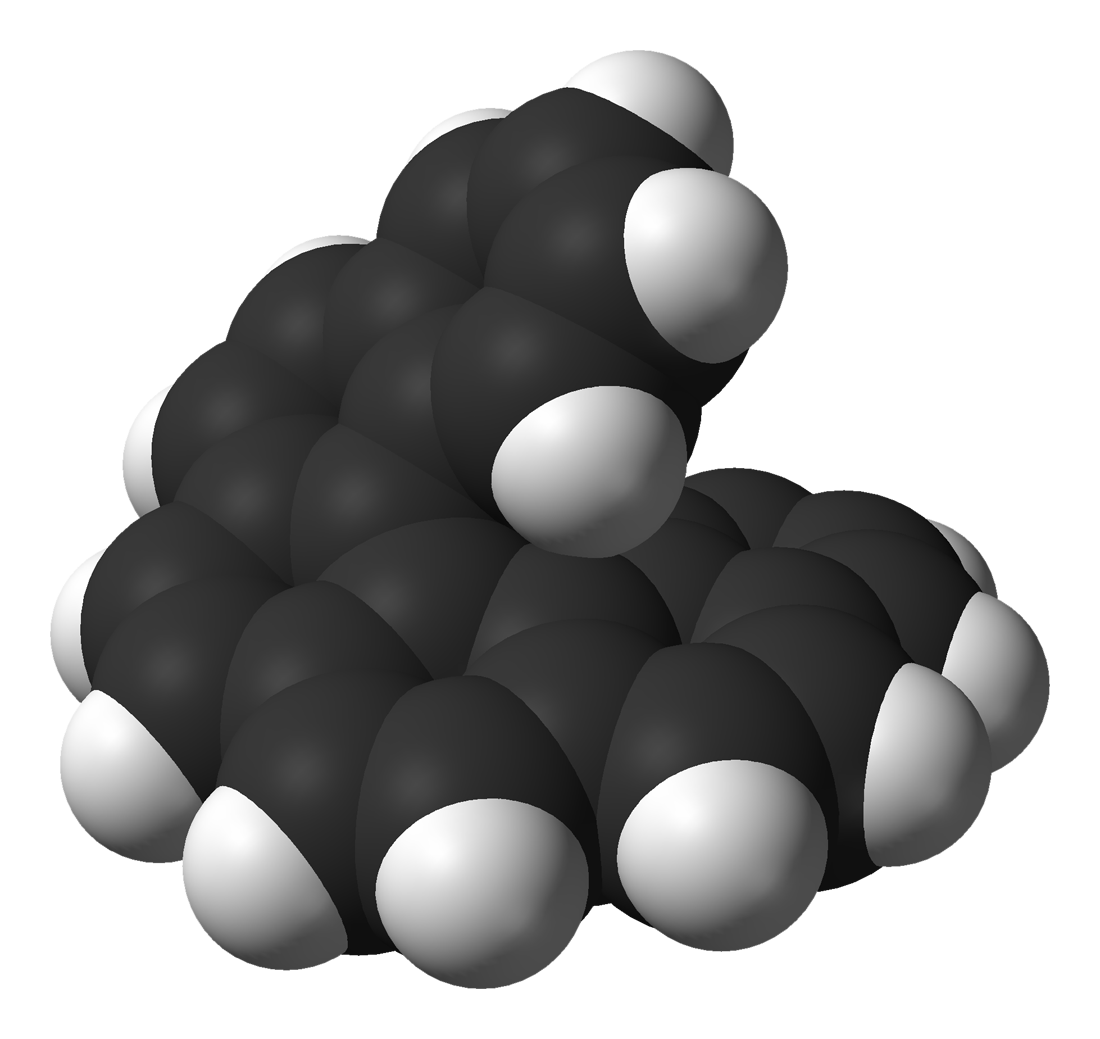
Hexahelicene

General structure formula of [n]helicene

In organic chemistry, helicenes are ortho-condensed polycyclic aromatic compounds in which benzene rings or other aromatics are angularly annulated to give helically-shaped chiral molecules. The chemistry of helicenes has attracted continuing attention because of their unique structural, spectral, and optical features.

== Structure and properties ==
The systematic naming for this class of compounds is based on the number of rings: [n]helicene is the structure consisting of n rings. According to IUPAC, only structures where n is at least 5 are considered helicenes. Some specific compounds also have alternate or trivial names. As the number of rings increases, starting at four, the structure becomes non-planar, but instead the planes of consecutive rings tilt to prevent steric collisions. For helicenes with six benzene units, a 360° turn is completed. In the helicene series the dihedral angles between the extremities increases going from [4]helicene (26°) to [6]helicene (58°) and then decreases again for example in [7]helicene (30°).

Helicenes are notable for having chirality despite lacking both asymmetric carbons and chiral centers. Instead, there is axial chirality, which results from the handedness of the helicity itself. The clockwise and counterclockwise helices are non-superposable. By convention a left-handed helix is minus and labeled (M), a right-handed helix is plus and labeled (P). Evidence from CD spectroscopy suggests left-handed helices are levorotatory and right-handed helices are dextrorotatory.

The stability of the two complementary helical enantiomers with respect to interconversion and the mechanism by which they interconvert depend on n.

== Synthesis ==
The first helicene structure was reported by Jakob Meisenheimer in 1903 as the reduction product of 2-nitronaphthalene. [5]helicene was synthesized in 1918 by Weitzenböck & Klingler. The first [6]helicene (also called hexahelicene) was synthesized by M. S. Newman and D. Lednicer in 1955 via a scheme that closed the two central rings by Friedel–Crafts cyclization of carboxylic acid compounds. Since then, several methods for synthesizing helicenes with different lengths and substituents are used. The oxidative photocyclization of a stilbene-type precursor is used most often as the key step. The longest helicene prepared by this method is [16]helicene in 2015.

In one study, [5]helicene was synthesized in an olefin metathesis reaction of a divinyl compound (prepared from 1,1′-bi-2-naphthol (BINOL) in several steps), with Grubbs' second generation catalyst:

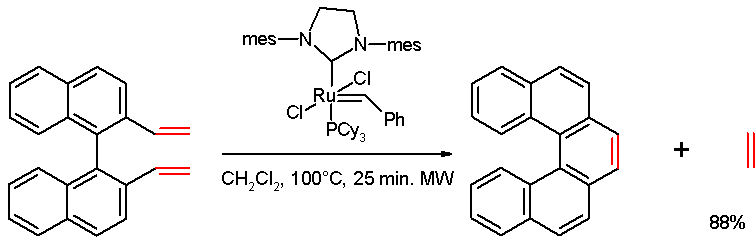
Helicene synthesis by olefin metathesis

Other approach is also non-photochemical and is based on assembly of biphenylyl-naphthalenes and their platinum-catalyzed double cycloisomerization leading to various [6]helicenes:

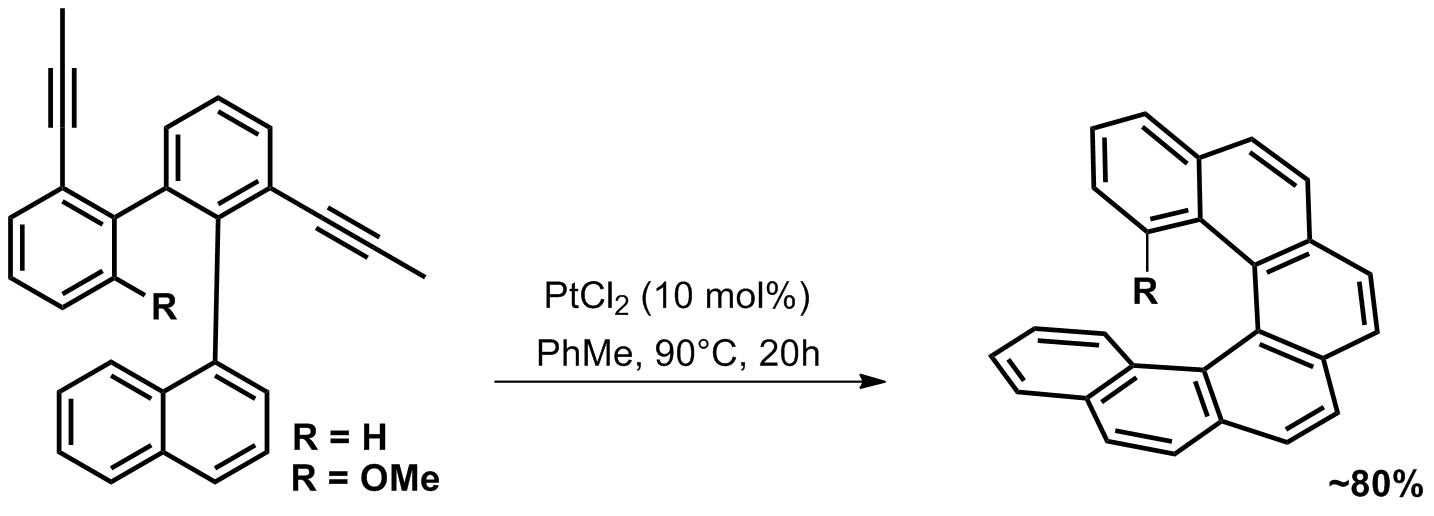

== Applications ==
Helicenes have been studied with respect to nonlinear optics, CPL, organocatalysis, conformational analysis, chirality sensing, chemical sensors and hetero-atom substitution.

Cobalt-[9]helicene is one of a rare class of multidecker metallocene polymers in which the metal atoms are laterally displaced.

== 3D structures of congeners ==
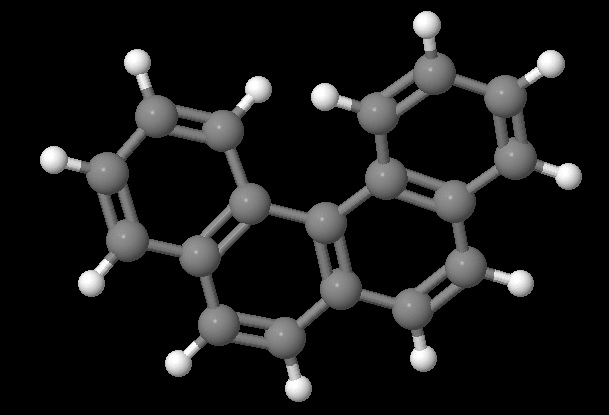
[4]Helicene

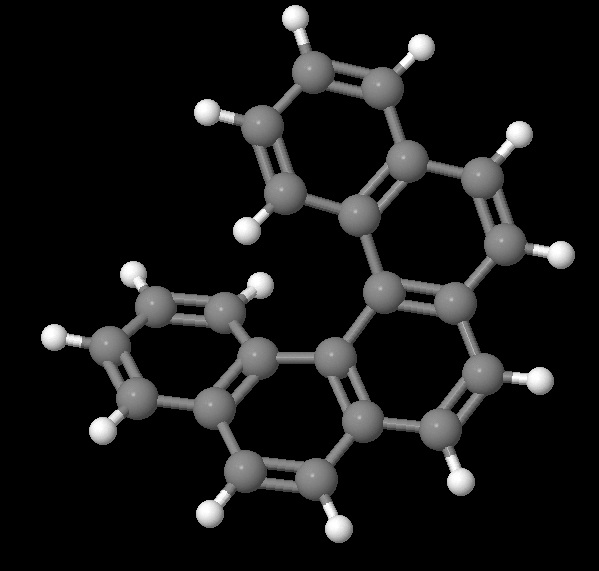
[5]Helicene

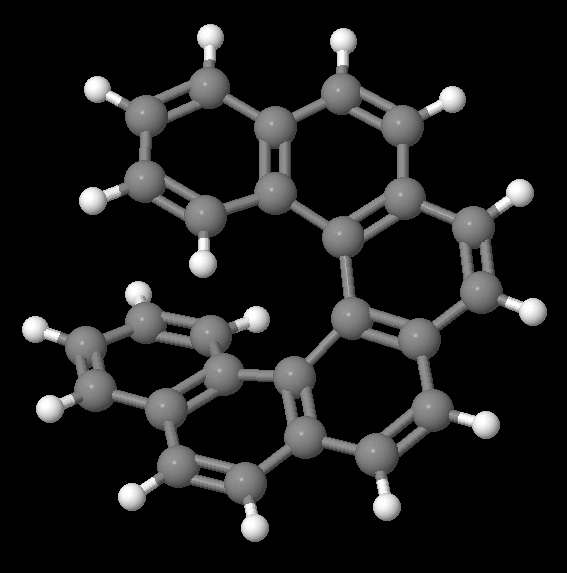
[6]Helicene

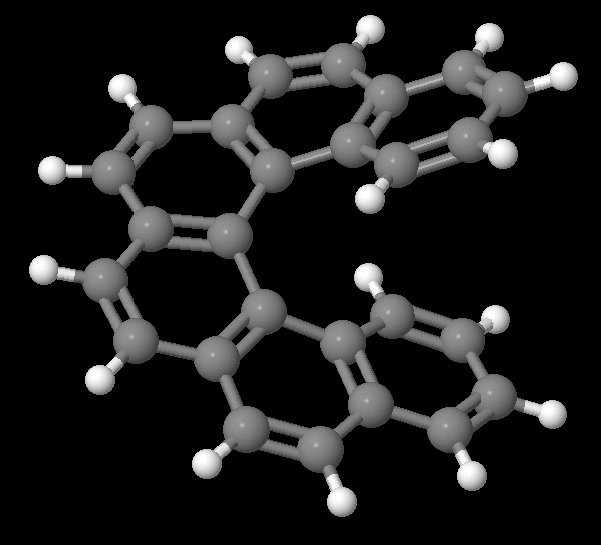
[6]Helicene, minus chirality

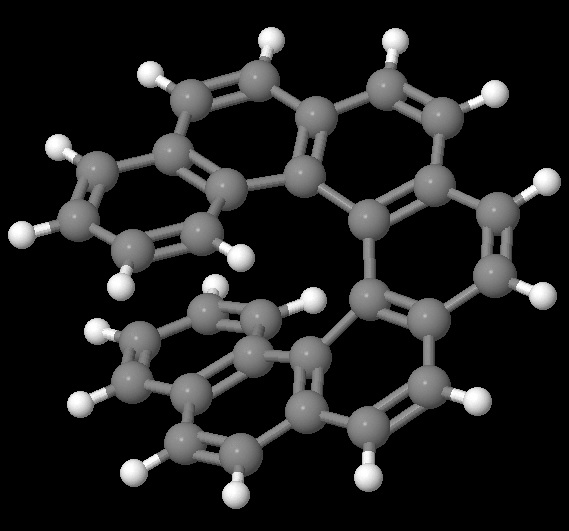
[7]Helicene

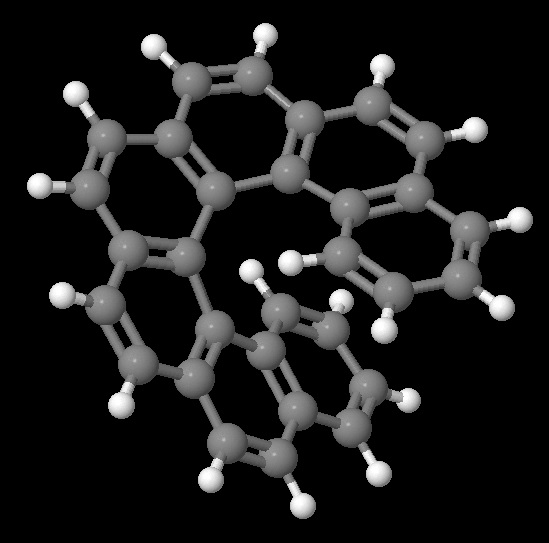
[7]Helicene, minus chirality

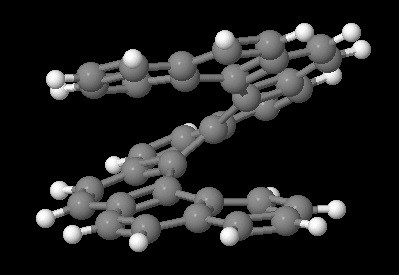
[8]Helicene

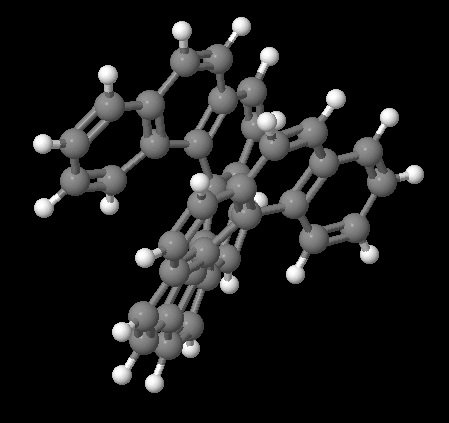
[9]Helicene

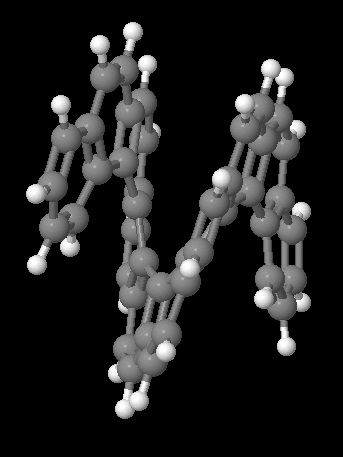
[10]Helicene

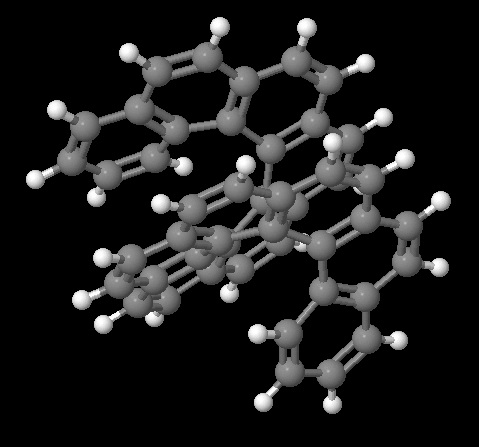
[11]Helicene

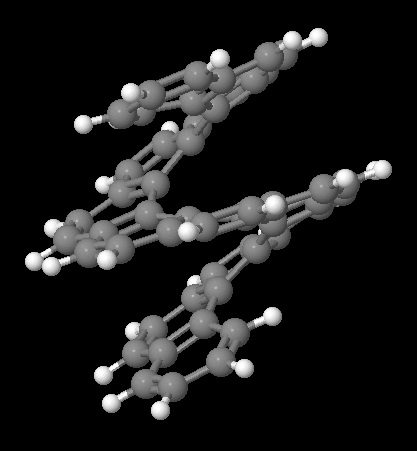
[12]Helicene

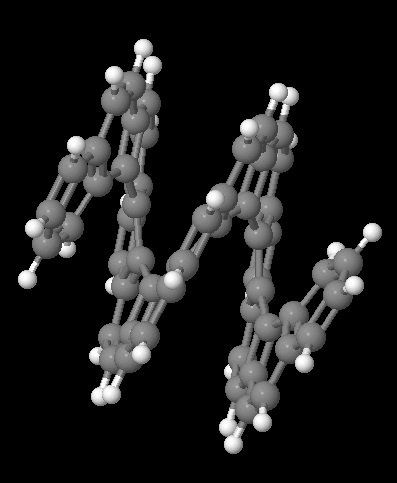
[13]Helicene

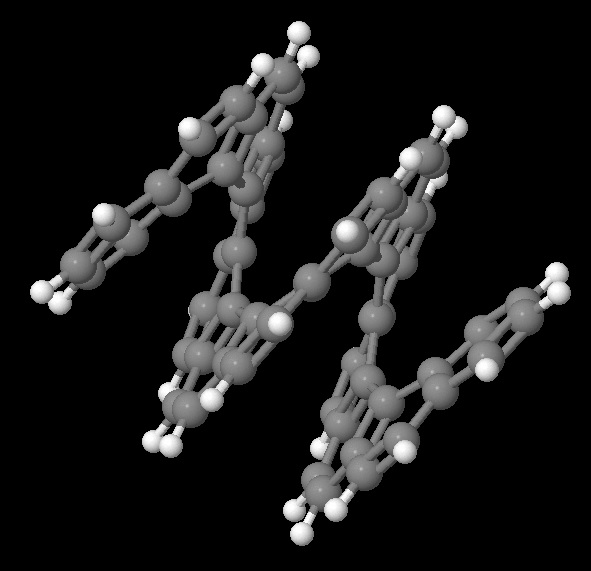
[14]Helicene

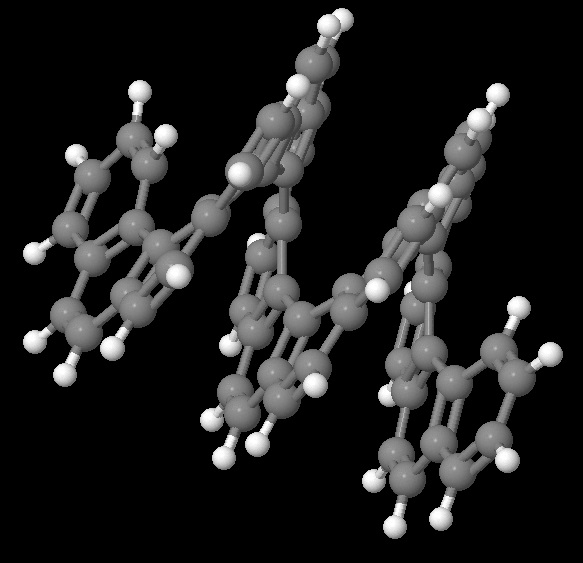
[15]Helicene

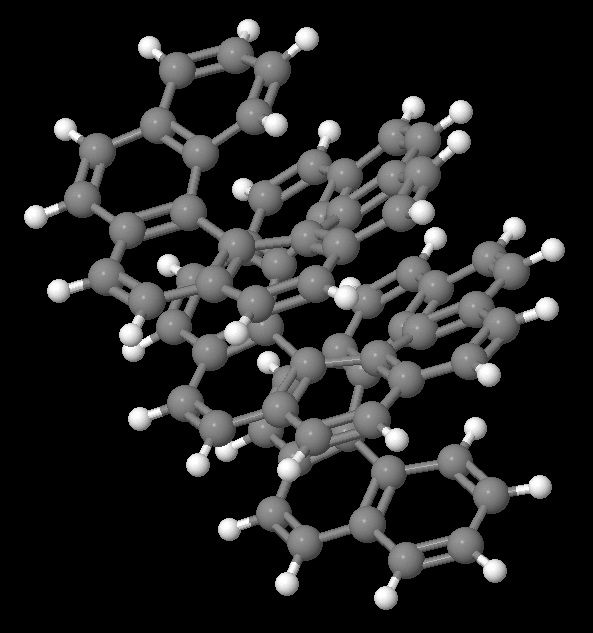
[16]Helicene

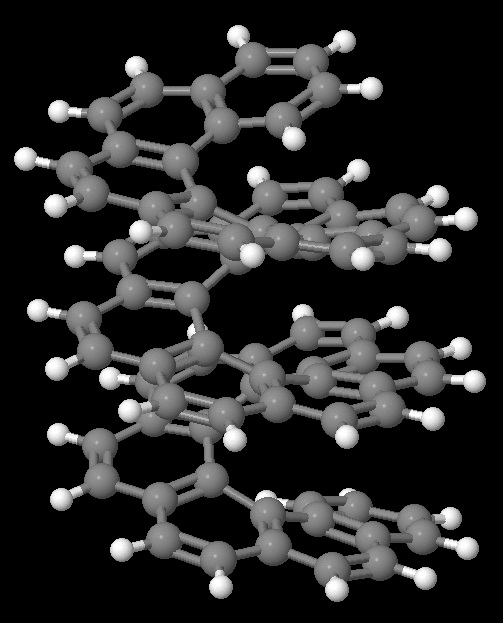
[18]Helicene

== See also ==
- Other configurations of consecutively-fused benzene rings:
  - Acenes, linear
  - Circulenes, closed ring
  - Phenacenes, zig-zag
