= Hexacene =

- Skeletal formula of hexacene

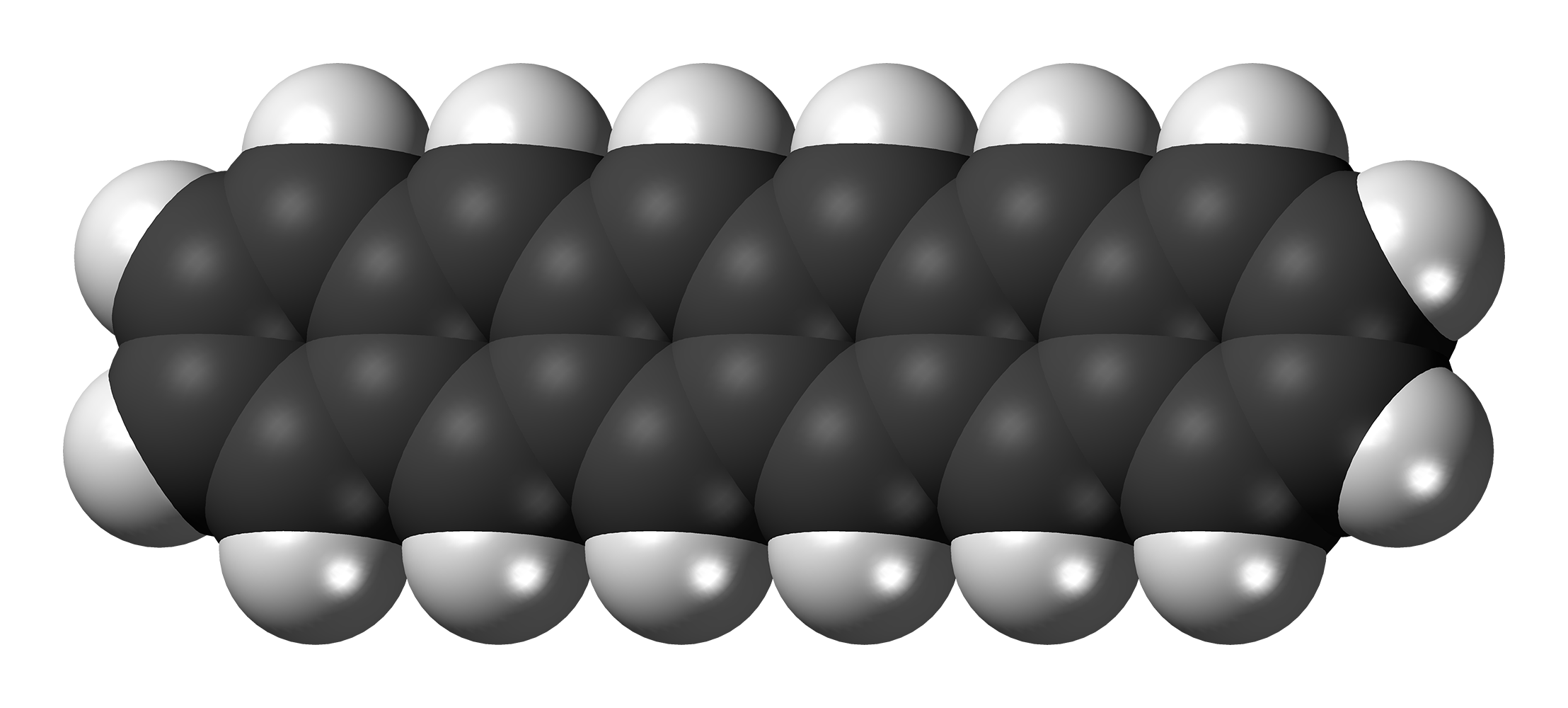

Names
- Preferred IUPAC name Hexacene

Identifiers
CAS Number	258-31-1
3D model (JSmol)	Interactive image
ChemSpider	109666
PubChem CID	123044
CompTox Dashboard (EPA)	DTXSID00180457
- InChI: InChI=1S/C26H16/c1-2-6-18-10-22-14-26-16-24-12-20-8-4-3-7-19(20)11-23(24)15-25(26)13-21(22)9-17(18)5-1/h1-16H Key: QSQIGGCOCHABAP-UHFFFAOYSA-N; InChI=1/C26H16/c1-2-6-18-10-22-14-26-16-24-12-20-8-4-3-7-19(20)11-23(24)15-25(26)13-21(22)9-17(18)5-1/h1-16H Key: QSQIGGCOCHABAP-UHFFFAOYAG
- SMILES: c1c2cc3cc4cc5cc6ccccc6cc5cc4cc3cc2ccc1

Properties
Chemical formula	C_{26}H_{16}
Molar mass	328.41 g/mol
- Except where otherwise noted, data are given for materials in their standard state (at 25 °C [77 °F], 100 kPa). verify (what is ?) Infobox references

Hexacene is an aromatic compound consisting of six linearly-fused benzene rings. It is a blue-green solid with low solubility. Like related large acenes, hexacene is air-stable as a solid, but its solutions are not. It is one of a series of linear polycyclic molecules created by such aromatic ring fusions, a series termed acenes; the previous in the series is pentacene (with five fused rings) and the next is heptacene (with seven). It and other acenes and their derivatives have been investigated in potential applications related to organic semiconductors.

== Syntheses and reactions ==
Hexacene has been the subject of many syntheses. One route uses thermal decarbonylation of a monoketone precursor.

Hexacene undergoes many cycloadditions to one of the two center rings, e.g. with diethyl malonate. These adducts revert to the parent upon heating. In this way, thin films of this semiconductor can be deposited.

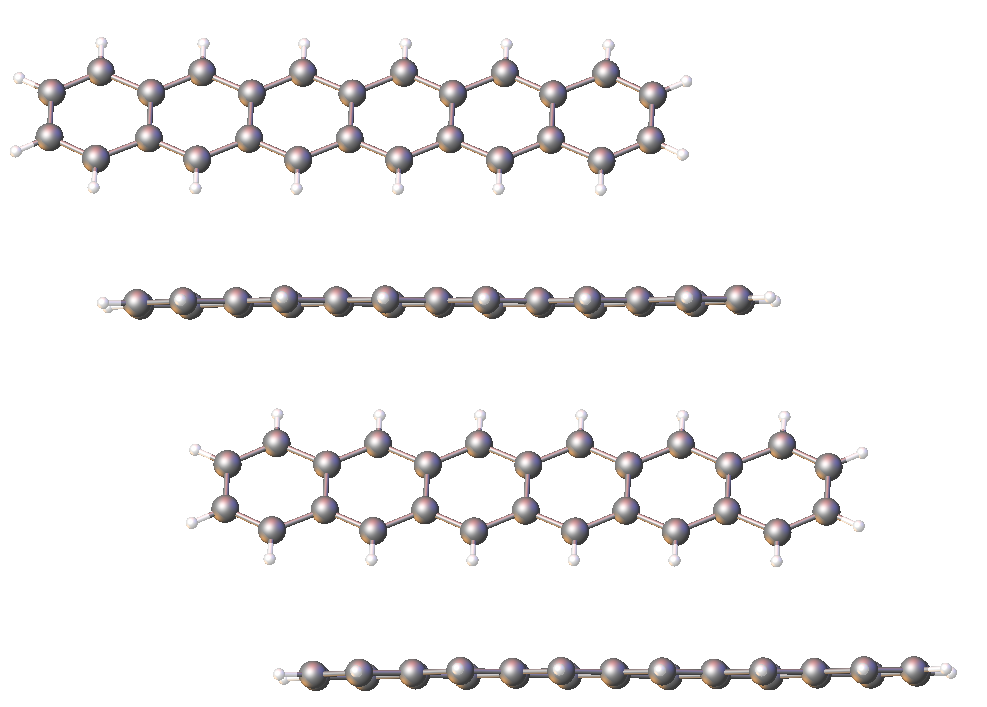
Packing diagram of crystalline hexacene, illustrating the herringbone structure.

Like larger acenes, hexacene is poorly soluble, but derivatives have been prepared with improved solubility, such as 6,15-Bis(tri-t-butylsilylethynyl)hexacene, which melts with decomposition at 96 °C.
