= Heptacene =

- Skeletal formula of heptacene

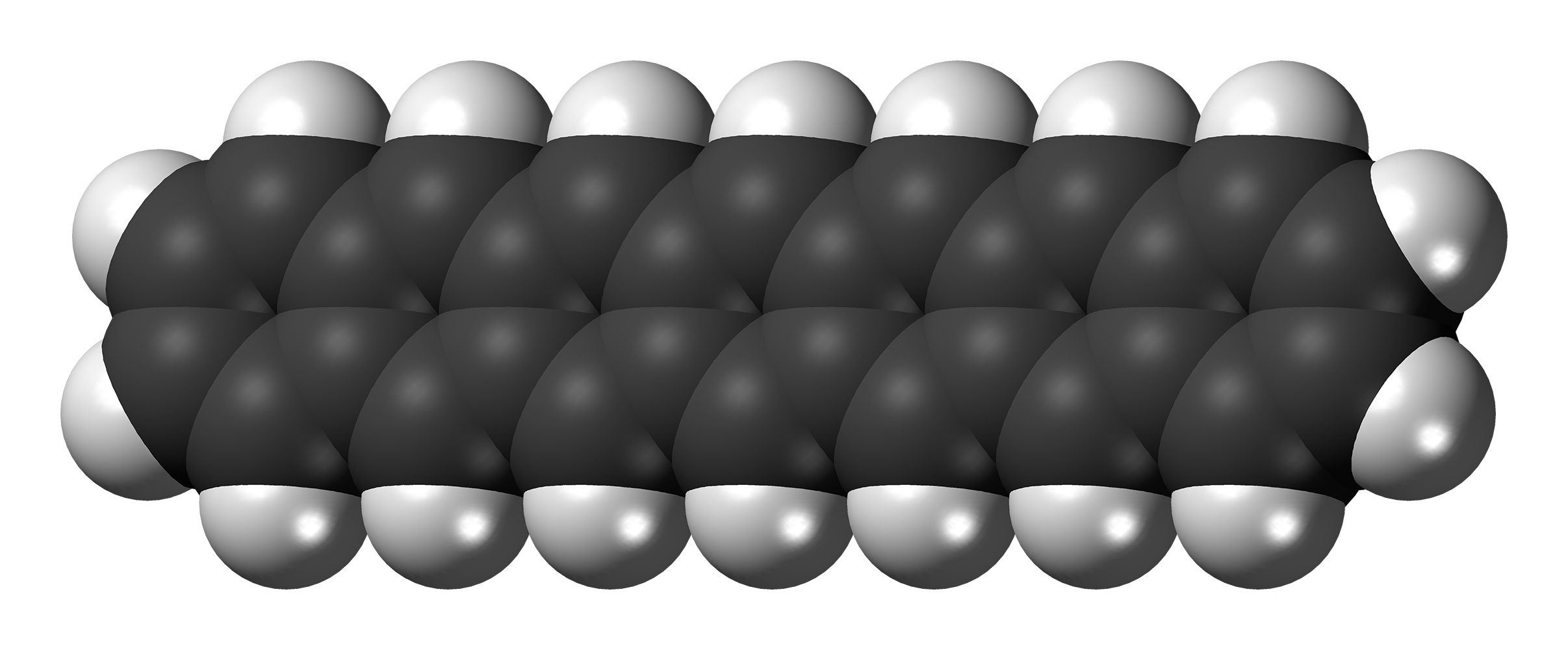

Names
- Preferred IUPAC name Heptacene

Identifiers
CAS Number	258-38-8
3D model (JSmol)	Interactive image
ChemSpider	4574185
PubChem CID	5460712
UNII	BC329D8R2F
CompTox Dashboard (EPA)	DTXSID50420113
- InChI: InChI=1S/C30H18/c1-2-6-20-10-24-14-28-18-30-16-26-12-22-8-4-3-7-21(22)11-25(26)15-29(30)17-27(28)13-23(24)9-19(20)5-1/h1-18H
- SMILES: c1cc2cc3cc4cc5cc6cc7ccccc7cc6cc5cc4cc3cc2ccc1

Properties
Chemical formula	C_{30}H_{18}
Molar mass	378.474 g·mol^{−1}
- Except where otherwise noted, data are given for materials in their standard state (at 25 °C [77 °F], 100 kPa). Infobox references

Heptacene is an organic compound and a polycyclic aromatic hydrocarbon and the seventh member of the acene or polyacene family of linear fused benzene rings. This compound has potential applications in molecular electronics.

It was first synthesized but not cleanly isolated in 2006. Heptacene was finally fully characterized in bulk by researchers in Germany and the United States in 2017.

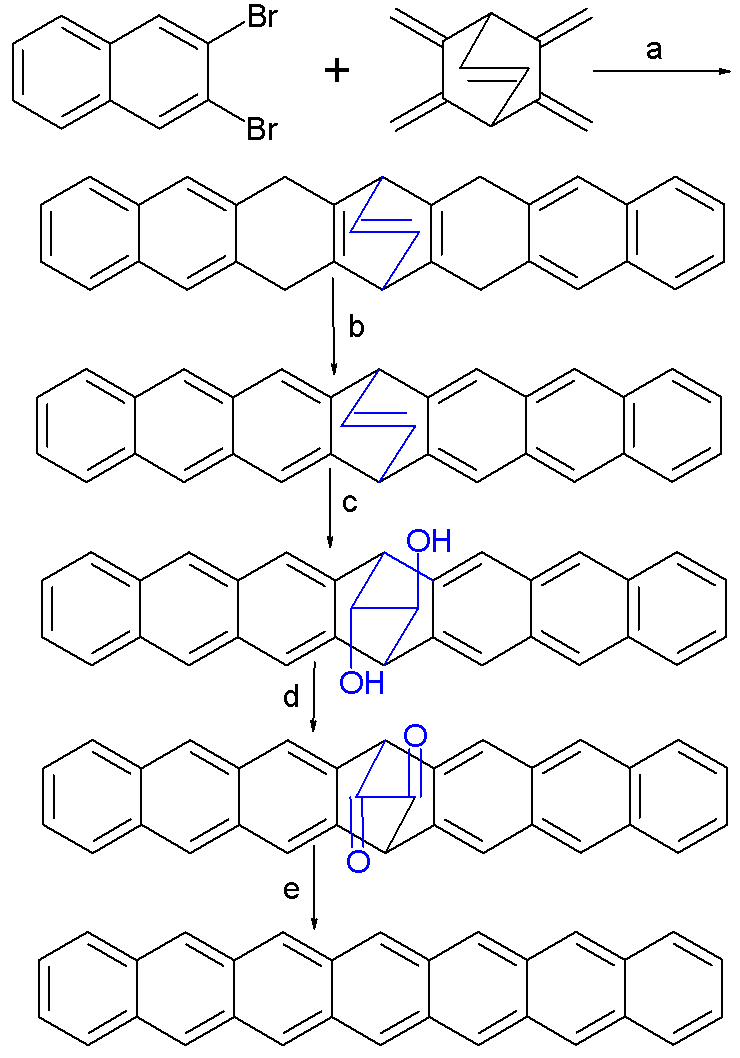
heptacene synthesis

The final step is a photochemical decarbonylization with a 1,2-dione bridge extruded as carbon monoxide. In solution heptacene is not formed because it is very unstable being a reactive DA diene and quickly reacts with oxygen or forms dimers. When on the other hand the dione precursor is dissolved in a PMMA matrix first, heptacene can be studied by spectroscopy. Heptacene has been studied spectroscopically at cryogenic temperatures in a matrix. When dissolved in sulfuric acid the heptacene dication is reported to be stable at room-temperature for more than a year in absence of oxygen. "[Isolated] solid heptacene has a half-life time of several weeks at room temperature."

== Derivatives ==
7,16-Bis(tris(trimethylsilyl)silylethynyl)heptacene was synthesized in 2005. This compound is stable in the solid state for a week but decomposes in contact with air. More-stable substituted heptacenes have been reported that have even larger substituents on them: with 2,6-dimethylphenyl and p-(tert-butyl)thiophenyl groups and with phenyl and triisopropylsilylethynyl groups.

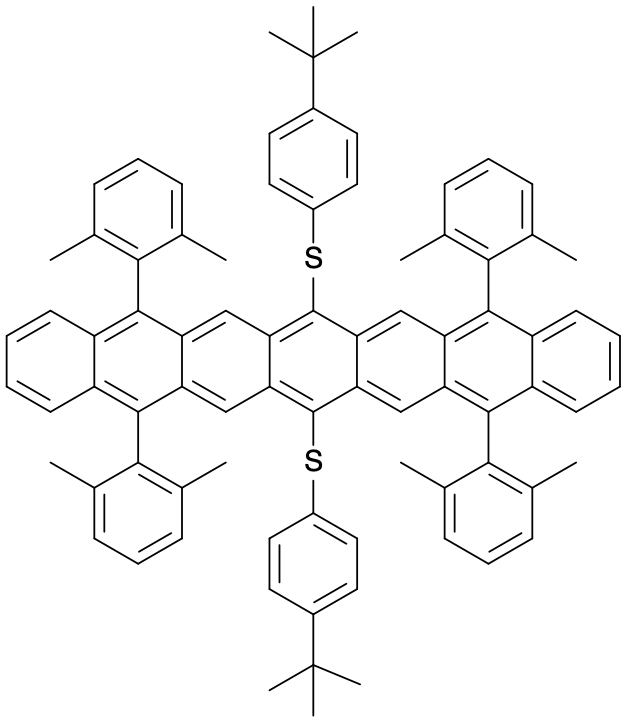
2,6-Dimethylphenyl and p-(tert-butyl)thiophenyl

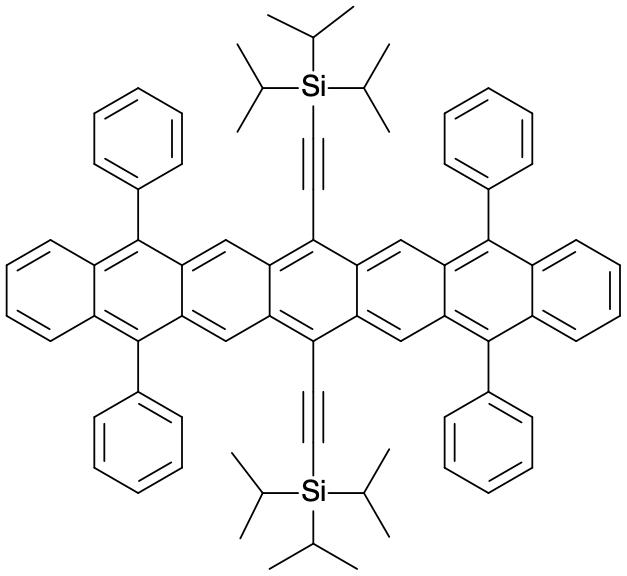
Phenyl and triisopropylsilylethyny
