= Triangulene =

Names
- Preferred IUPAC name Dibenzo[cd,mn]pyrene-4,8-diyl
- Other names [3]Triangulene

Identifiers
3D model (JSmol)	Interactive image
ChemSpider	58825768
PubChem CID	102378663
CompTox Dashboard (EPA)	DTXSID701337130
- InChI: InChI=1S/C22H12/c1-4-13-10-15-6-2-8-17-12-18-9-3-7-16-11-14(5-1)19(13)22(20(15)17)21(16)18/h1-12H Key: YUXIWEBPPQSVAK-UHFFFAOYSA-N
- SMILES: c1cc2cc3cccc4c3c-5c2c(c1)[CH]c6c5c(ccc6)[CH]4

Properties
Chemical formula	C_{22}H_{12}
Molar mass	276.338 g·mol^{−1}
- Except where otherwise noted, data are given for materials in their standard state (at 25 °C [77 °F], 100 kPa). Infobox references

Triangulene (also known as Clar's hydrocarbon) is the smallest triplet-ground-state polybenzenoid. It exists as a biradical with the chemical formula C_{22}H_{12}. It was first hypothesized by Czech chemist Erich Clar in 1953. Its first confirmed synthesis was published in a February 2017 issue of Nature Nanotechnology, in a project led by researchers David Fox and Anish Mistry at the University of Warwick in collaboration with IBM. Other attempts by Japanese researchers including Yasushi Morita and Takeji Takui have been successful only in making substituted triangulene derivatives.

A six-step synthesis yielded two isomers of dihydrotriangulene which were then deposited on xenon or copper base. The researchers used a combined scanning tunneling and atomic force microscope (STM/AFM) to remove individual hydrogen atoms. The synthesized molecule of triangulene remained stable at high-vacuum low-temperature conditions for four days, giving the scientists plenty of time to characterize it (also using STM/AFM).

== [n]Triangulenes ==
Triangulene, as defined here, is a member of a wider class of [n]triangulenes, where n is the number of hexagons along an edge of the molecule. Thus, triangulene may also be referred to as [3]triangulene.

=== Theory ===
A tight-binding description of the molecular orbitals of [n]triangulenes predicts that [n]triangulenes have (n − 1) unpaired electrons, which are associated to (n − 1) non-bonding states. When electron–electron interactions are included, theory predicts that the ground state total spin quantum number S of [n]triangulenes is S = (n − 1)/2. Thus, [3]triangulenes are predicted to have an S = 1 ground state. The intramolecular exchange interaction in triangulene, which determines the energy difference between the S = 1 ground state and the S = 0 excited state, is predicted to be the largest among all polycyclic aromatic hydrocarbon (PAH) diradicals, due to maximum overlap of the wave function of the unpaired electrons.

The ground state spin of [n]triangulenes can be rationalized in terms of a theorem by Elliot H. Lieb, which relates, for a bipartite lattice, the ground state spin of the Hubbard model at half filling to the sublattice imbalance.

=== Experiments ===
So far, the ultra-high vacuum on-surface syntheses of [n]triangulenes with n = 3, 4, 5 and 7 (the hitherto largest triangulene homologue) have been reported. In addition, the on-surface synthesis of [3]triangulene dimers has also been reported, where inelastic electron tunneling spectroscopy provides a direct evidence of a strong antiferromagnetic coupling between the triangulenes. In 2021, an international team of researchers reported the fabrication of [3]triangulene-based quantum spin chains on a gold surface, where signatures of both spin fractionalization and Haldane gap were observed.
