= Phenalene =

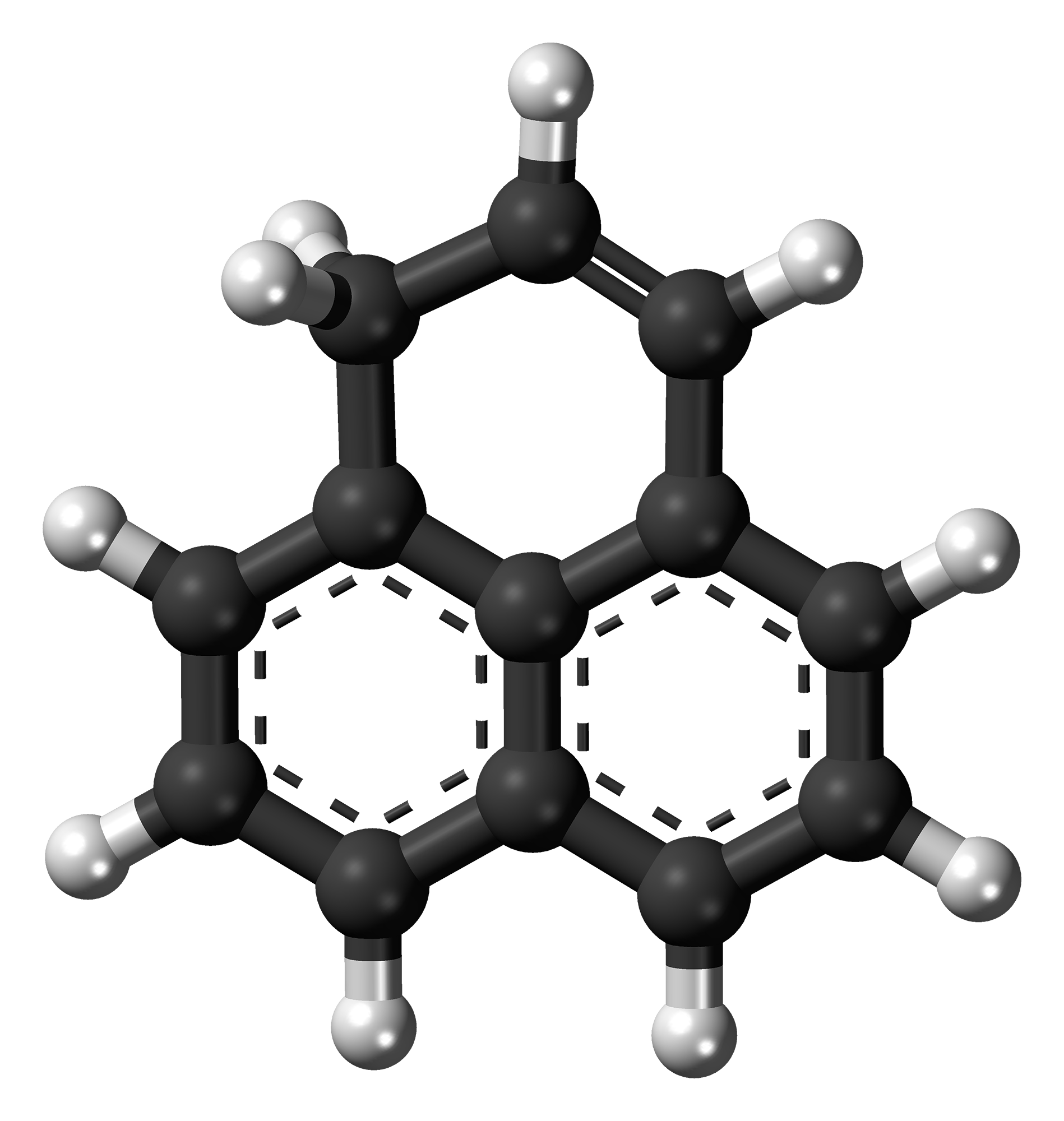

Names
- Preferred IUPAC name 1H-Phenalene
- Other names 1-Benzonaphthene; 1H-Benzonaphthene; Perinaphthene; Perinaphthindene; peri-Naphthindene

Identifiers
| CAS Number | 203-80-5 |
| 3D model (JSmol) | Interactive image |
| ChEBI | CHEBI:33082 |
| ChemSpider | 8795 |
| ECHA InfoCard | 100.005.371 |
| PubChem CID | 9149 |
| UNII | DQ27KZF2V7 |
| CompTox Dashboard (EPA) | DTXSID5075369 |
- InChI: InChI=1S/C13H10/c1-4-10-6-2-8-12-9-3-7-11(5-1)13(10)12/h1-8H,9H2 Key: XDJOIMJURHQYDW-UHFFFAOYSA-N; InChI=1/C13H10/c1-4-10-6-2-8-12-9-3-7-11(5-1)13(10)12/h1-8H,9H2 Key: XDJOIMJURHQYDW-UHFFFAOYAK
- SMILES: c3c1cccc2\C=C/Cc(c12)cc3

Properties
| Chemical formula | C_{13}H_{10} |
| Molar mass | 166.22 g/mol |
| Appearance | white solid |
| Density | 1.139 g/cm^{3} |
| Melting point | 159–160 °C (318–320 °F; 432–433 K) |
| Acidity (pK_{a}) | 18.1 (in DMSO) |
- Except where otherwise noted, data are given for materials in their standard state (at 25 °C [77 °F], 100 kPa). verify (what is ?) Infobox references

1H-Phenalene, often called simply phenalene is a polycyclic aromatic hydrocarbon (PAH). Like many PAHs, it is an atmospheric pollutant formed during the combustion of fossil fuels. It is the parent compound for the phosphorus-containing phosphaphenalenes.

The name was proposed by German chemists in 1922 as a contraction of periphenonaphthalene.

It has been discovered in interstellar space in the Taurus Molecular cloud (TMC-1) as part of the QUIJOTE survey.

== Reactions ==
Phenalene is deprotonated by potassium methoxide to give the phenalenyl anion.

== See also ==
- Zethrene
- Cyclopentadiene
