= Erich Clar =

Czech chemist (1902–1987)

- Born: 23 August 1902; Hřensko
- Died: 27 March 1987 (aged 84); Estepona, Spain
- Scientific career
- Fields: Organic chemistry of polycyclic aromatic hydrocarbons
- Workplaces: University of Glasgow

Erich Clar (23 August 1902 – 27 March 1987) was a German organic chemist who studied polycyclic aromatic hydrocarbon chemistry.

== Biography ==
Clar was born in Hřensko (a village directly at the border of Germany and the Czech Republic; Czech: Hřensko, German: Herrnskretschen), During World War II he had no participation and no party membership in the NSDAP and did research in his Privatlabor Herrnskretschen (private laboratory in Herrnskretschen/Hřensko) on polycyclic aromatic hydrocarbons, especially on the acenes. He is considered to be the father of that field.

In 1941, he authored Aromatische Kohlenwasserstoffe (Springer-Verlag) and in 1964 the greatly expanded two-volume Polycyclic Hydrocarbons, which described the syntheses, properties, and UV–visible absorption spectra of hundreds of PAHs. He discovered the Clar reaction, the reductive coupling of perinaphthenone, the ketone formally derived from phenalene, in a melt of zinc dust, zinc chloride, and sodium chloride at c. 300 °C to form dibenzo[cd,lm]perylene. Clar also applied the reaction to larger polycyclic aromatic ketones such as benzanthrone; it was later extended to cross-couplings. He created the Sextet Theory, now eponymously called Clar's rule, to describe the behavior of polycyclic aromatic hydrocarbon isomers. This was described in his book The Aromatic Sextet.

Clar moved to Scotland in 1946 and worked in the chemistry department of the University of Glasgow from 1953 to 1972, becoming a reader in chemistry.

He was awarded the August Kekulé Medal by the Chemical Society of the GDR in 1965, the highest award given by that society to foreign scientists, as well as the first Polycyclic Aromatic Hydrocarbon Research Award of the International Symposium on Polynuclear Aromatic Hydrocarbons in 1987.

He died aged 84 in 1987 at Estepona.

== See also ==
- Clar's hydrocarbon
- Clar's rule
- Iptycene
