= Pentacene =

Hydrocarbon compound (C22H14) made of 5 fused benzene rings

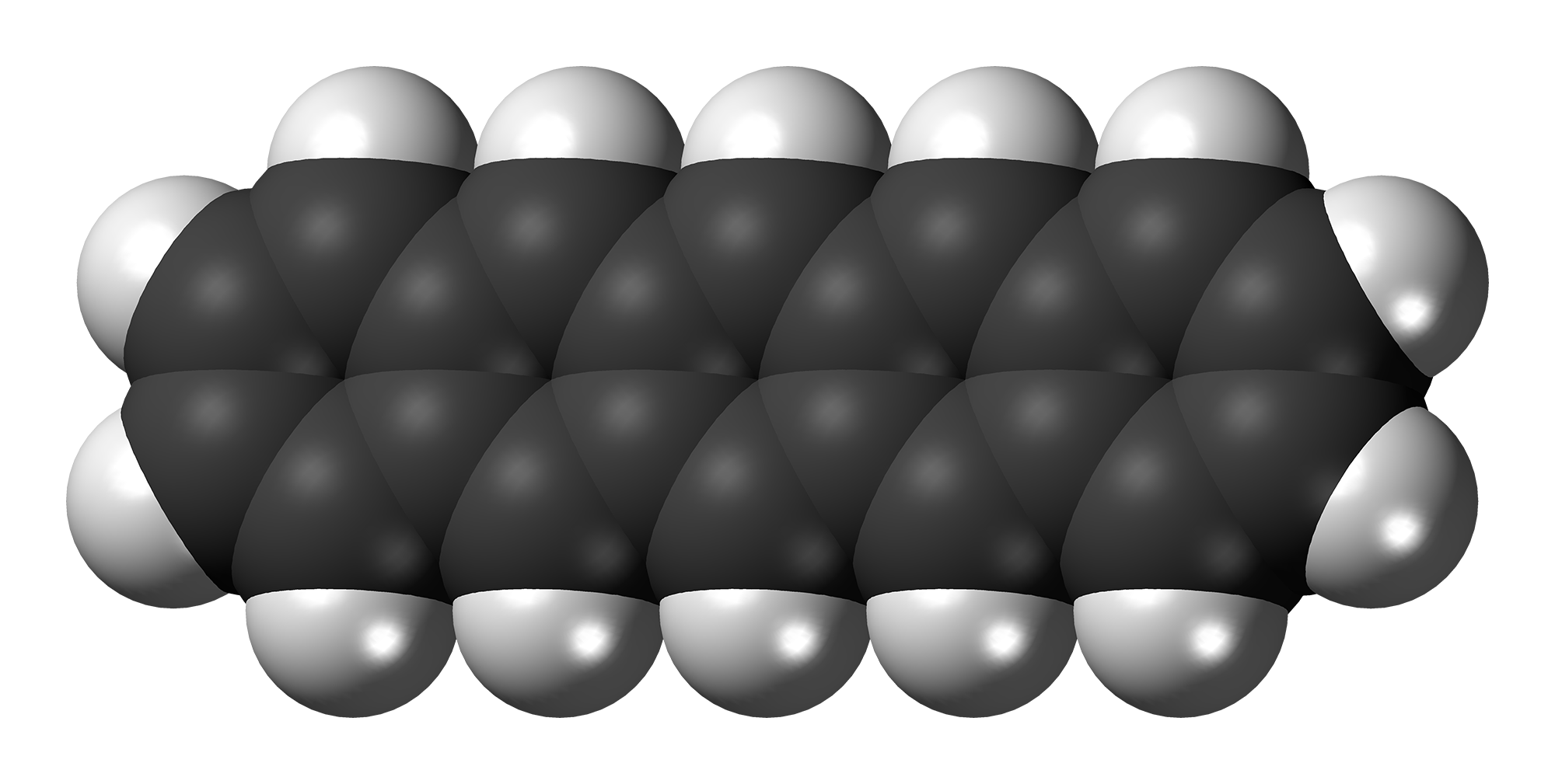

Names
- Preferred IUPAC name Pentacene
- Other names 2,3:6,7-Dibenzanthracene; Benzo[b]naphthacene; Dibenz[b,i]anthracene; NSC 90784 lin-Dibenzanthracene lin-Naphthoanthracene

Identifiers
CAS Number	135-48-8
3D model (JSmol)	Interactive image
Beilstein Reference	1912418
ChEBI	CHEBI:33148
ChemSpider	8347
ECHA InfoCard	100.004.722
EC Number	205-193-7
Gmelin Reference	733903
PubChem CID	8671
UNII	9FQU5HA0UY
CompTox Dashboard (EPA)	DTXSID7059648
- InChI: InChI=1S/C22H14/c1-2-6-16-10-20-14-22-12-18-8-4-3-7-17(18)11-21(22)13-19(20)9-15(16)5-1/h1-14H Key: SLIUAWYAILUBJU-UHFFFAOYSA-N; InChI=1/C22H14/c1-2-6-16-10-20-14-22-12-18-8-4-3-7-17(18)11-21(22)13-19(20)9-15(16)5-1/h1-14H Key: SLIUAWYAILUBJU-UHFFFAOYAR
- SMILES: c1ccc2cc3cc4cc5ccccc5cc4cc3cc2c1

Properties
Chemical formula	C_{22}H_{14}
Molar mass	278.354 g·mol^{−1}
Appearance	Dark blue powder
Density	1.3 g cm^{−3}
Melting point	> 300 °C (572 °F; 573 K) sublimes at 372 °C
Boiling point	40–43 °C (104–109 °F; 313–316 K) at 0.15 torr
Magnetic susceptibility (χ)	−205.4 × 10^{−6} cm^{3} mol^{−1}

Structure
Crystal structure	Triclinic
Space group	P-1
- Except where otherwise noted, data are given for materials in their standard state (at 25 °C [77 °F], 100 kPa). verify (what is ?) Infobox references

Pentacene (C_{22}H_{14}) is a polycyclic aromatic hydrocarbon consisting of five linearly-fused benzene (C_{6}H_{6}) rings. This highly conjugated compound is an organic semiconductor. The compound generates excitons upon absorption of ultra-violet (UV) or visible light; this makes it very sensitive to oxidation. For this reason, this compound, which is a purple powder, slowly degrades upon exposure to air and light.

Structurally, pentacene is one of the linear acenes, the previous one being tetracene (four fused benzene rings) and the next one being hexacene (six fused benzene rings). In August 2009, a group of researchers from IBM published experimental results of imaging a single molecule of pentacene using an atomic force microscope. In July 2011, they used a modification of scanning tunneling microscopy to experimentally determine the shapes of the highest occupied and lowest unoccupied molecular orbitals.

In 2012, pentacene-doped p-terphenyl was shown to be effective as the amplifier medium for a room-temperature maser.

== Synthesis ==
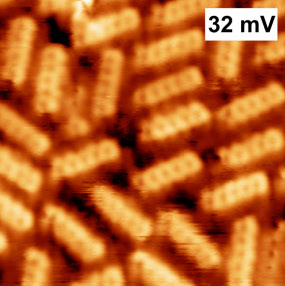
Scanning tunneling microscopy image of pentacene molecules on nickel.

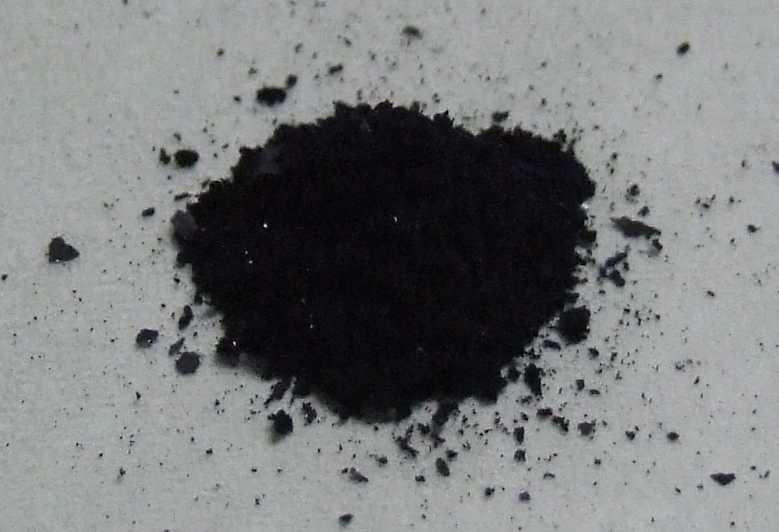
Pentacene powder

The compound, originally called dinaphthanthracene after naphthalene and anthracene (modern nomenclature for polyacenes, including pentacene, was only introduced in 1939 by Erich Clar), was first synthesized in 1912 by British chemists William Hobson Mills and Mildred May Gostling. A classic method for pentacene synthesis is by the Elbs reaction.

Elbs reaction to pentacene

Pentacenes can also be prepared by extrusion of a small volatile component (carbon monoxide) from a suitable precursor at 150 °C.

Formation of pentacene by extrusion of carbon monoxide

The precursor itself is prepared in three steps from two molecules of α,α,α',α'-tetrabromo-o-xylene with a 7-tert-butoxybicyclo[2.2.1]hepta-2,5-diene by first heating with sodium iodide in dimethylformamide to undergo a series of elimination and Diels–Alder reactions to form the ring system, then hydrolysing the tert-butoxy group to an alcohol and followed by its oxidation to the ketone.

Pentacene synthesis

The product is reported to have some solubility in chloroform and is therefore amenable to spin coating. Pentacene is soluble in hot chlorinated benzenes, such as 1,2,4-trichlorobenzene, from which it can be recrystallized to form platelets.

== Pentacene derivatives ==
=== Monomeric pentacene derivatives ===
6,13-Substituted pentacenes are accessible through pentacenequinone by reaction with an aryl or alkynyl nucleophile (for example Grignard or organolithium reagents) followed by reductive aromatization. Another method is based on homologization of diynes by transition metals (through zirconacyclopentadienes) Functionalization of pentacene has allowed for control of the solid-state packing of this chromophore. The choice of the substituents (both size and location of substitution on the pentacene) influences the solid-state packing and can be used to control whether the compound adopts 1-dimensional or 2-dimensional cofacial pi-stacking in the solid-state, as opposed to the herringbone packing observed for pentacene.

Although pentacene's structure resembles that of other aromatic compounds like anthracene, its aromatic properties are poorly defined; as such, pentacene and its derivatives are the subject of much research.

A tautomeric chemical equilibrium exists between 6-methylidene-6,13-dihydropentacene and 6-methylpentacene.

6-methylpentacene equilibrium

This equilibrium is entirely in favor of the methylidene compound. Only by heating a solution of the compound to 200 °C does a small amount of the pentacene develop, as evidenced by the emergence of a red-violet color. According to one study the reaction mechanism for this equilibrium is not based on an intramolecular 1,5-hydride shift, but on a bimolecular free radical hydrogen migration.

Pentacene reacts with elemental sulfur in 1,2,4-trichlorobenzene to the compound hexathiapentacene. X-ray crystallography shows that all the carbon-to-sulfur bond lengths are roughly equal (170 pm); from this, it follows that resonance structures B and C with complete charge separation are more significant than structure A.

Hexathiapentacene

In the crystal phase the molecules display aromatic stacking interactions, whereby the distance between some sulfur atoms on neighboring molecules can become less (337 pm) than the sum of two Van der Waals radii (180 pm)

Like the related tetrathiafulvalene, this compound is studied in the field of organic semiconductors.

The acenes may appear as planar and rigid molecules, but in fact they can be very distorted. The pentacene depicted below:

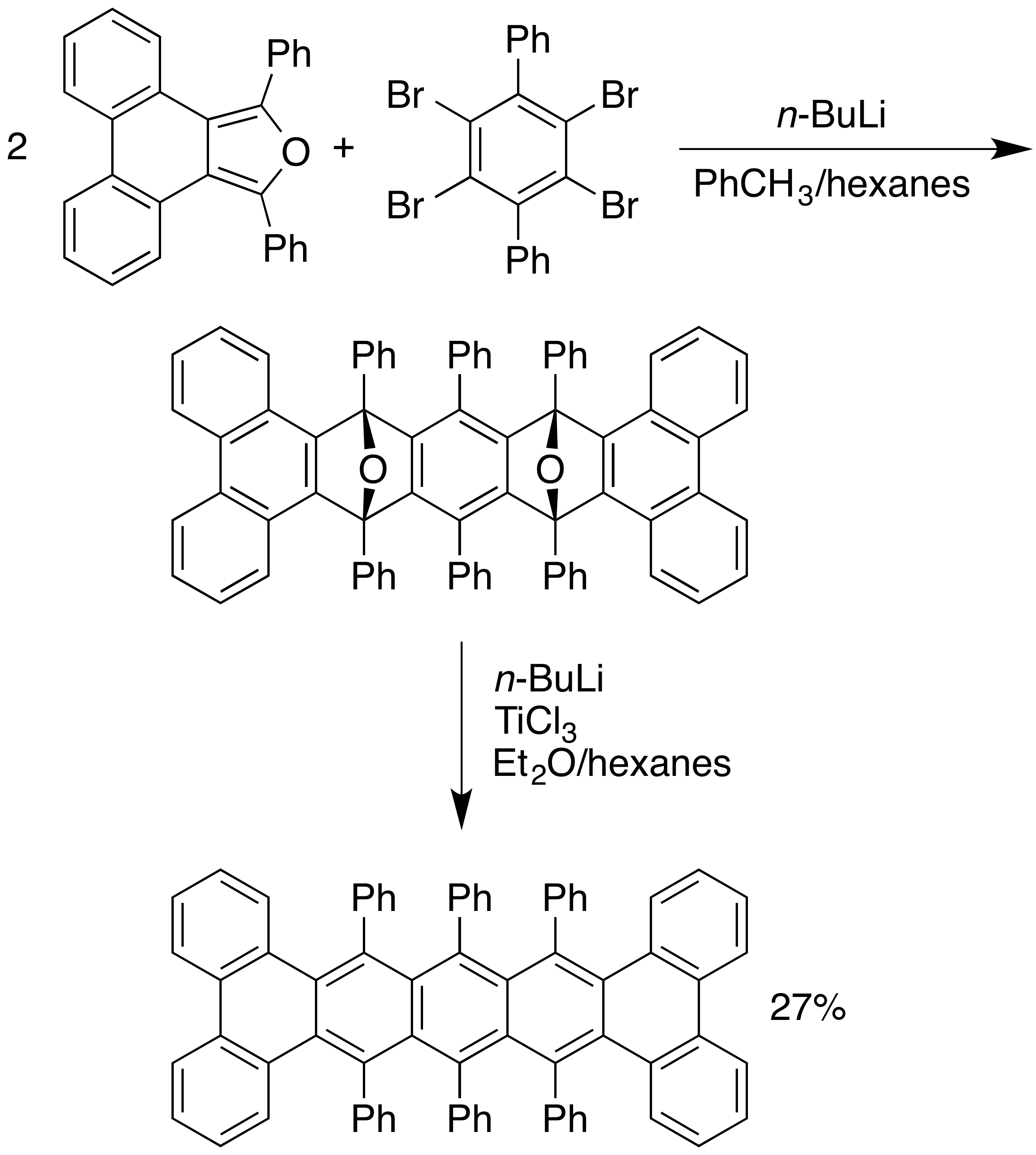
Twisted acenes

has an end-to end twist of 144° and is sterically stabilized by the six phenyl groups. The compound can be resolved into its two enantiomers with an unusually high reported optical rotation of 7400° although racemization takes place with a chemical half-life of 9 hours.

=== Oligomers and polymers of pentacene ===
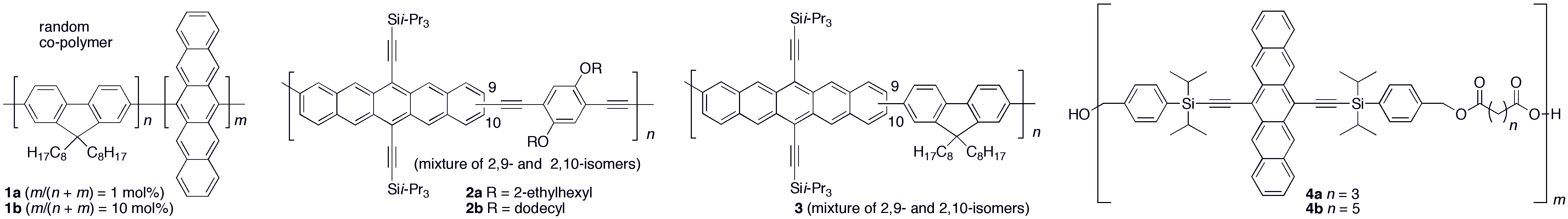

Oligomers and polymers based on pentacene have been explored both synthetically as well as in device application settings. Polymer light emitting diodes (PLEDs) have been constructed using conjugated copolymers (1a–b) containing fluorene and pentacene. A few other conjugated pentacene polymers (2a–b and 3) have been realized based on Sonogashira and Suzuki coupling reactions of a dibromopentacene monomer. Non-conjugated pentacene-based polymers have been synthesized via esterification of a pentacene diol monomer with bis-acid chlorides to form polymers 4a–b.

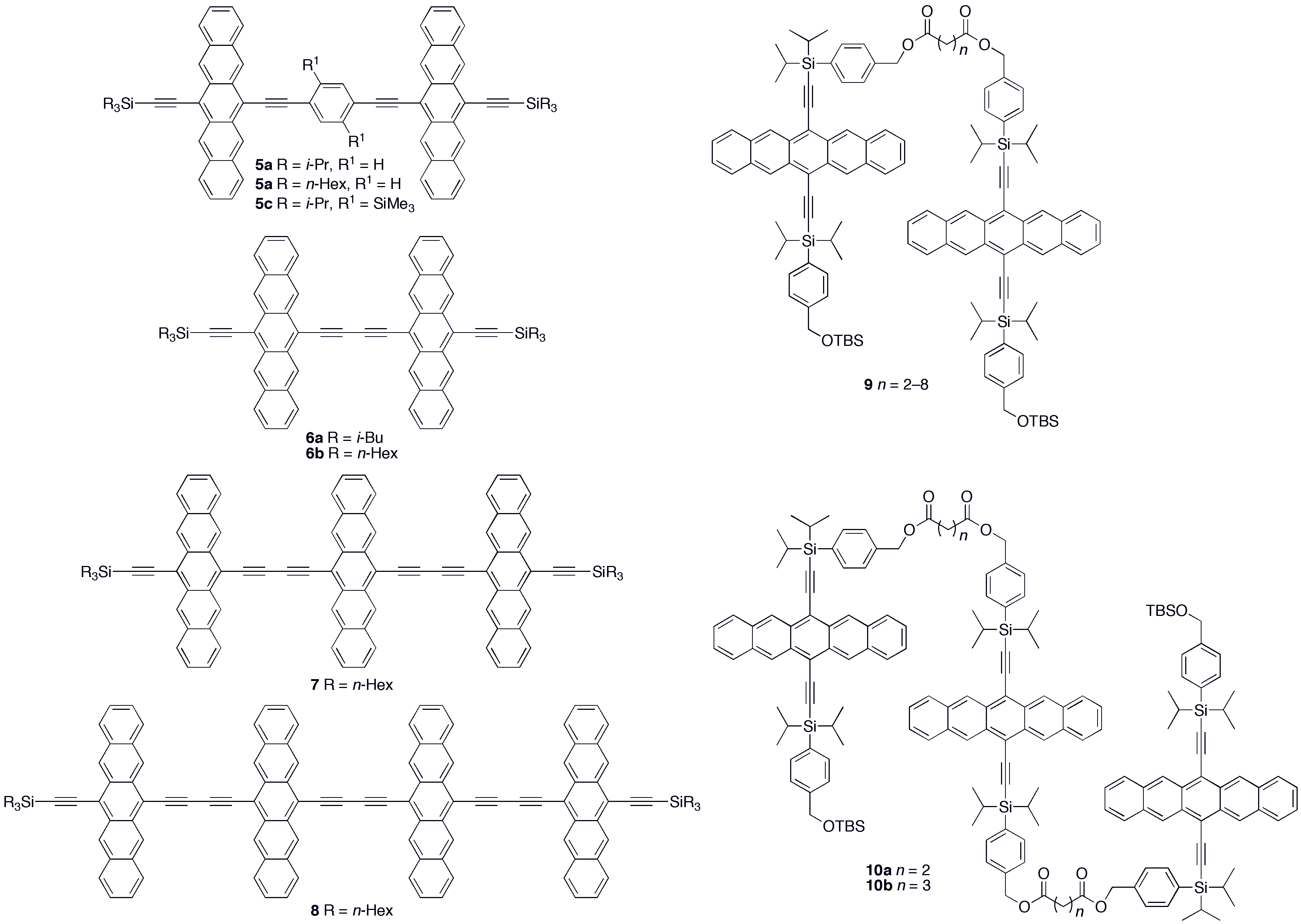
Various synthetic strategies have been employed to form conjugated oligomers of pentacene 5a–c including a one-pot-four-bond forming procedure which provided a solution-processable conjugated pentacene dimer (5c) which exhibited photoconductive gain >10, placing its performance within the same order of magnitude as thermally evaporated films of non-functionalized pentacene which exhibited photoconductive gain >16 using analogous measurement techniques. A modular synthetic method to conjugated pentacene di-, tri- and tetramers (6–8) has been reported which is based on homo- and cross-coupling reactions of robust dehydropentacene intermediates. Non-conjugated oligomers 9–10 based on pentacene have been synthesized, including dendrimers 9–10 with up to 9 pentacene moieties per molecule with molar absorptivity for the most intense absorption > 2,000,000 M^{−1}•cm^{−1}. Dendrimers 11–12 were shown to have improved performance in devices compared to analogous pentacene-based polymers 4a–b in the context of photodetectors.

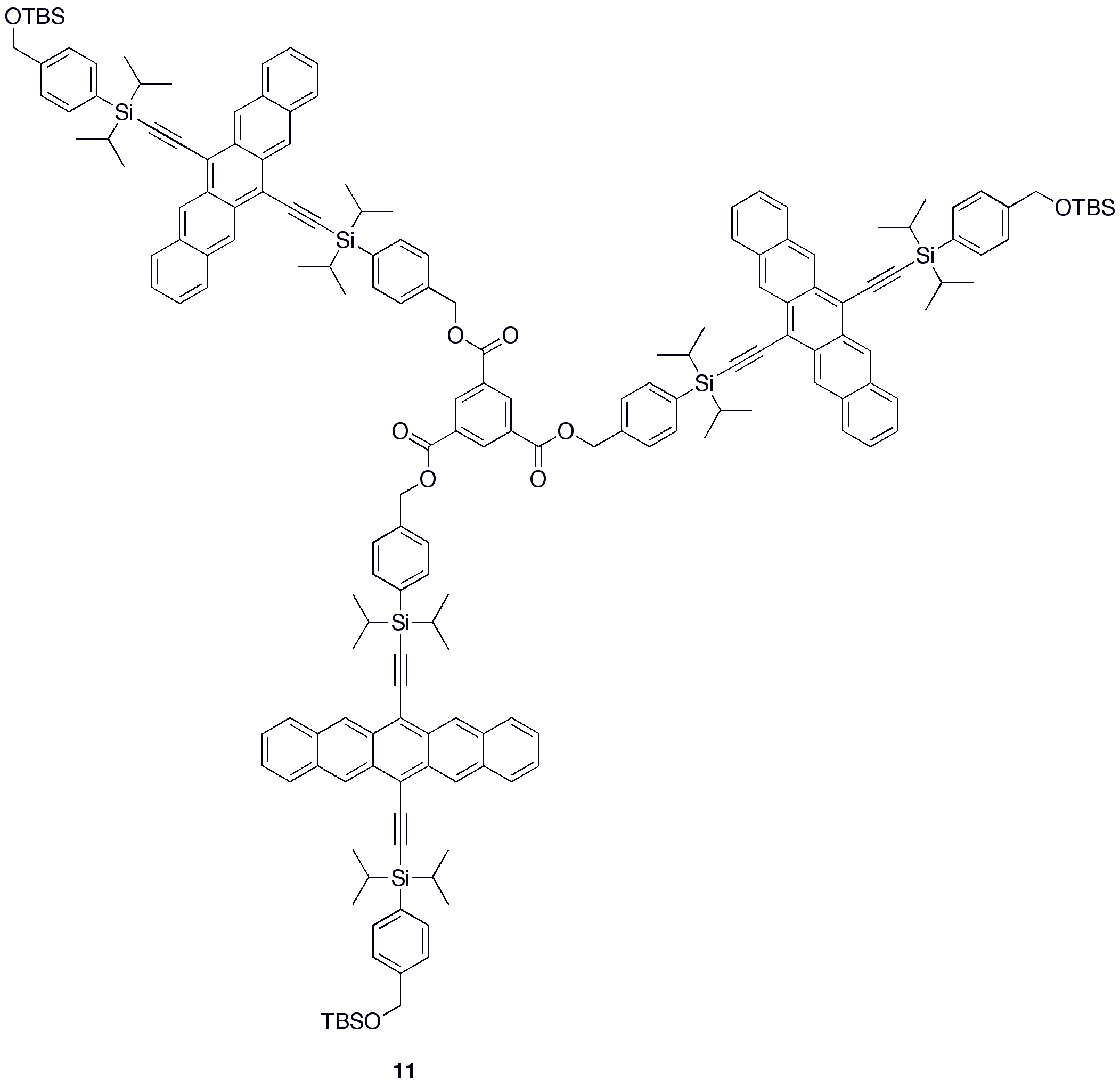
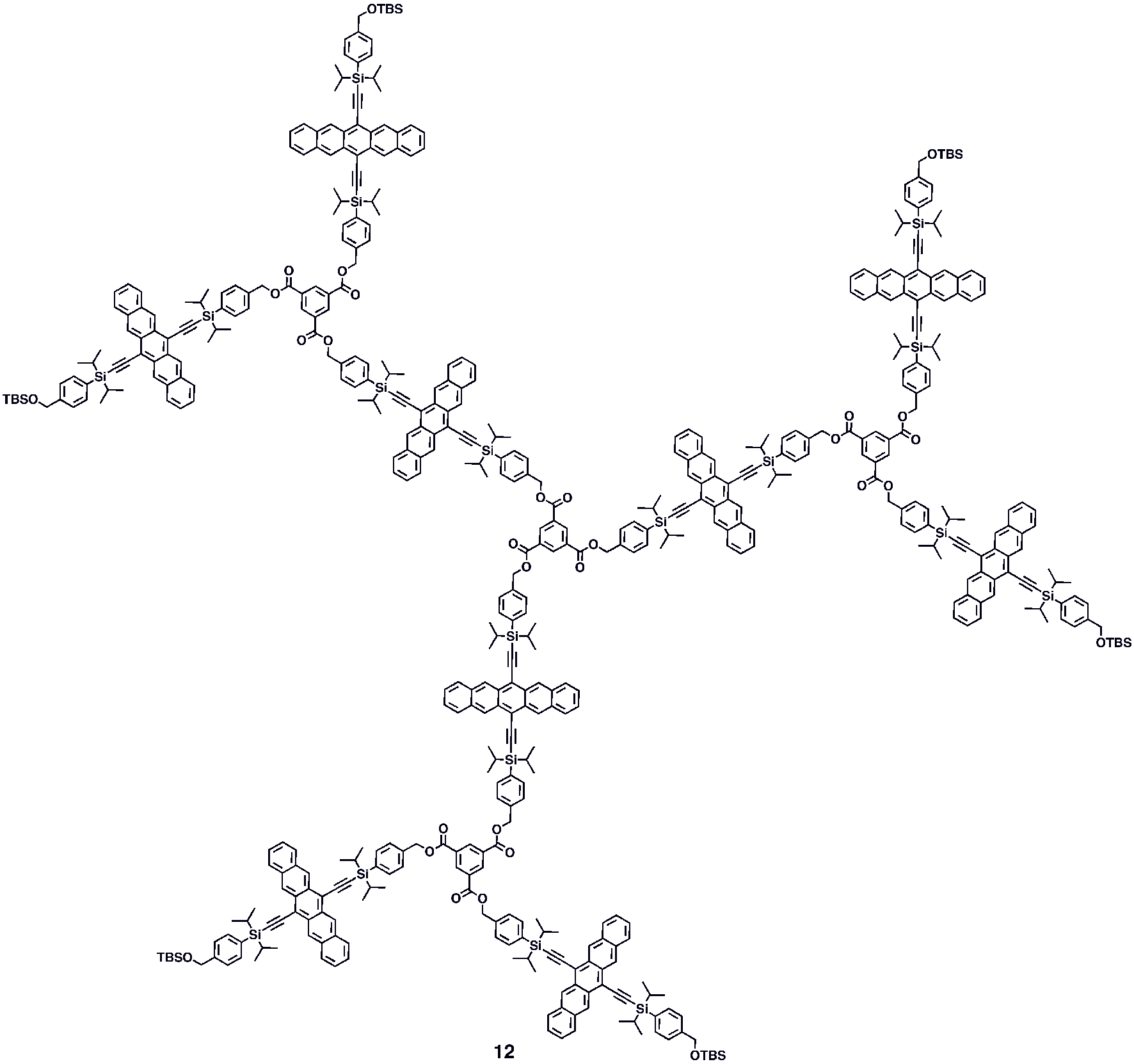

== Materials research ==
Pentacenes have been examined as potential dichroic dyes. The pentacenoquinone displayed below is fluorescent and when mixed with liquid crystal E7 mixture a dichroic ratio of 8 is reached. Longer acenes align better in the nematic liquid crystal phase.

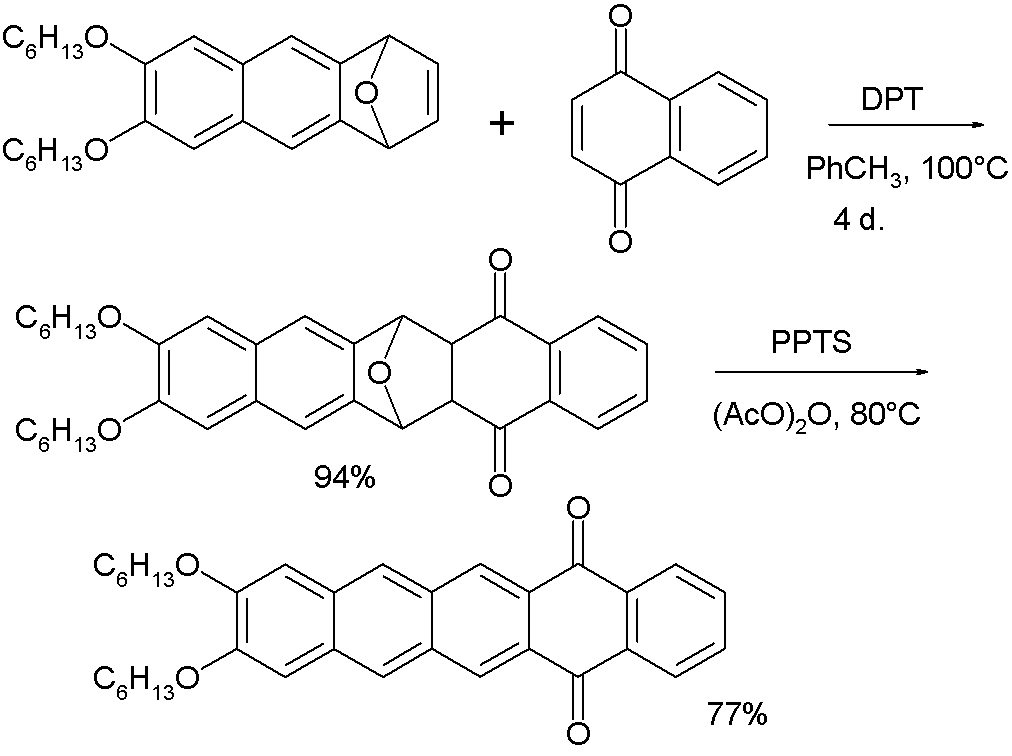
Fluorescent acenequinones

Combined with buckminsterfullerene, pentacene is used in the development of organic photovoltaic prototypes. Organic photovoltaic cells are cheaper and more flexible than traditional inorganic cells, which could potentially open doors to solar cells in new markets.

Pentacene is a popular choice for research on organic thin-film transistors and OFETs, being one of the most thoroughly investigated conjugated organic molecules with a high application potential due to a hole mobility in OFETs of up to 5.5 cm^{2}/(V·s), which exceeds that of amorphous silicon.

Pentacene, as well as other organic conductors, is subject to rapid oxidation in air, which precludes commercialization. If the pentacene is preoxidized, the pentacene-quinone is a potential gate insulator, then the mobility can approach that of rubrene – the highest-mobility organic semiconductor – namely, 40 cm^{2}/(V·s). This pentacene oxidation technique is akin to the silicon oxidation used in the silicon electronics.

== See also ==
- Perfluoropentacene
