= Octacene =

- Skeletal formula of octacene

Names
- Preferred IUPAC name Octacene

Identifiers
3D model (JSmol)	Interactive image
ChEBI	CHEBI:33165
ChemSpider	4574182
PubChem CID	5460708
- InChI: InChI=1S/C34H20/c1-2-6-22-10-26-14-30-18-34-20-32-16-28-12-24-8-4-3-7-23(24)11-27(28)15-31(32)19-33(34)17-29(30)13-25(26)9-21(22)5-1/h1-20H Key: PFTXKXWAXWAZBP-UHFFFAOYSA-N
- SMILES: C1=CC=C2C=C3C=C4C=C5C=C6C=C7C=C8C=CC=CC8=CC7=CC6=CC5=CC4=CC3=CC2=C1

Properties
Chemical formula	C_{34}H_{20}
Molar mass	428.534 g·mol^{−1}
- Except where otherwise noted, data are given for materials in their standard state (at 25 °C [77 °F], 100 kPa). Infobox references

Octacene is an organic compound and a polycyclic aromatic hydrocarbon and the eighth member of the acene or polyacene family of linear fused benzene rings. Its chemical formula is C_{34}H_{20}.

== Synthesis ==
In 2010, the Bettinger group reported a photochemical synthesis of octacene and nonacene, utilizing a cryogenic matrix-isolation technique to stabilize these highly reactive acenes. This approach requires precursors containing a double α-diketone bridge to enable the formation of octacene and nonacene.
