= Tetracene =

- Skeletal formula

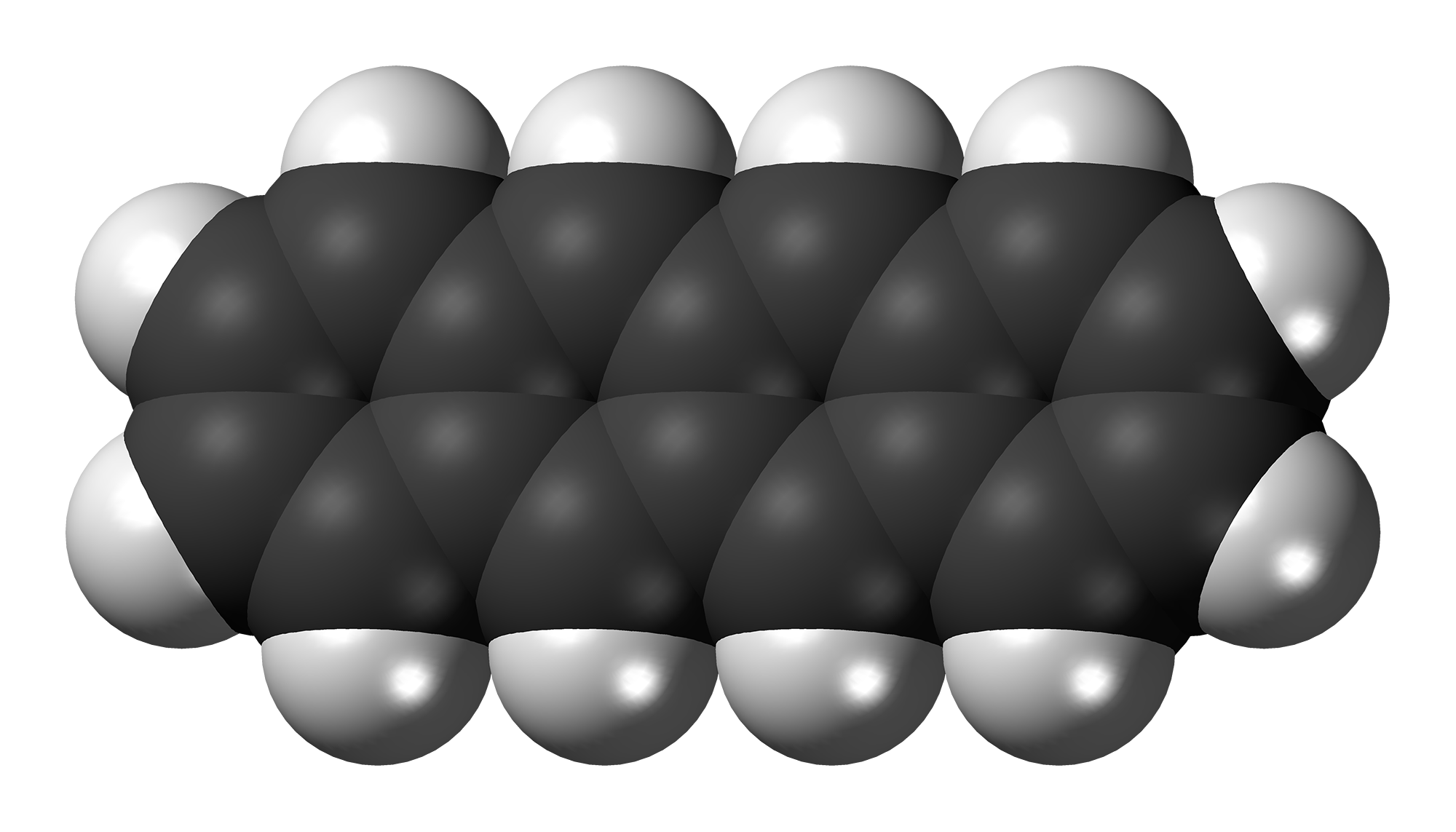

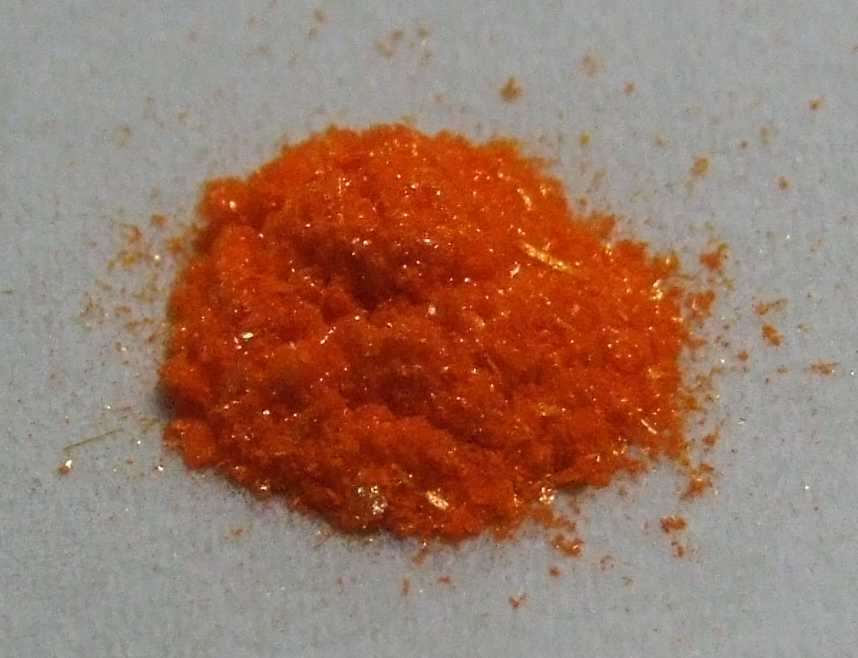
- Tetracene crystals

Names
- Preferred IUPAC name Tetracene
- Other names Naphthacene; Benz[b]anthracene; 2,3-Benzanthracene; Tetracyclo[8.8.0.0^{3,8}.0^{12,17}]octadeca-1,3,5,7,9,11,13,15,17-nonaene

Identifiers
CAS Number	92-24-0
3D model (JSmol)	Interactive image
ChEBI	CHEBI:32600
ChemSpider	6813
ECHA InfoCard	100.001.945
PubChem CID	7080
UNII	QYJ5Z6712R
CompTox Dashboard (EPA)	DTXSID4059045
- InChI: InChI=1S/C18H12/c1-2-6-14-10-18-12-16-8-4-3-7-15(16)11-17(18)9-13(14)5-1/h1-12H Key: IFLREYGFSNHWGE-UHFFFAOYSA-N
- SMILES: c1c2cc3cc4ccccc4cc3cc2ccc1

Properties
Chemical formula	C_{18}H_{12}
Molar mass	228.29 g/mol
Appearance	Yellow to orange solid
Melting point	357 °C (675 °F; 630 K)
Boiling point	436.7 °C (818.1 °F; 709.8 K)
Solubility in water	Insoluble
Magnetic susceptibility (χ)	−168.0·10^{−6} cm^{3}/mol
- Except where otherwise noted, data are given for materials in their standard state (at 25 °C [77 °F], 100 kPa). verify (what is ?) Infobox references

Tetracene, also called naphthacene, is a polycyclic aromatic hydrocarbon. It has the appearance of a pale orange powder. Tetracene is the four-ringed member of the series of acenes.

Tetracene is a molecular organic semiconductor, used in organic field-effect transistors (OFETs) and organic light-emitting diodes (OLEDs). Tetracene can be used as a gain medium in dye lasers as a sensitiser in chemoluminescence. Napthacene forms the core of the tetracycline class of antibiotics.

== History and synthesis ==
In 1884, W. Roser attempted to synthesize a compound called "Aethindiphtalyls" (literally "ethyne diphthalyl") by heating 3 parts of phthalic anhydride, 3 parts of succinic acid and one part of sodium acetate according to Siegmund Gabriel's procedure. And then he found that there was a brick-red byproduct was produced in a large amount in the reaction, which was called "Isoäthindiphtalid" ("Isoethyne diphthalide") and founded to be an isomer of "Aethindiphtalyls". In 1898, Gabriel and Ernst Leupold conducted a study on the byproduct and confirmed it was a new class of compound containing 4 rings.

In the same document, Gabriel and Leupold reported their synthesis of tetracene by condensating two moles of phthalic anhydride with a mole of succinic acid into a quinone then reduced with zinc dust. They named in naphthacene, likely as portmanteau of naphthalene and anthracene. Modern nomenclature for polyacenes, including tetracene, was introduced by Erich Clar in 1939. Clar also developed a new route to synthesize tetracene from the Friedel-Crafts acylation between phthalic anhydride and tetralin catalyzed by AlCl_{3}, ZnCl_{2} and NaCl involving Clemmensen reduction, forming 5,12-dihydrotetracene then dehydrogenated by chloranil to form tetracene.

The synthetic route of tetracene developed by Erich Clar.

German physicist Jan Hendrik Schön claimed to have developed an electrically pumped laser based on tetracene during his time at Bell Labs (1997–2002). However, his results could not be reproduced, and this is considered to be a scientific fraud.

In May 2007, Japanese researchers from Tohoku University and Osaka University reported an ambipolar light-emitting transistor made of a single tetracene crystal. Ambipolar means that the electric charge is transported by both positively charged holes and negatively charged electrons.

In 2024, it was used to produce lower-energy excitations in solar cells in a process known as singlet fission. An interface layer between tetracene and silicon transfers them into the silicon layer, where most of their energy can be converted into electricity.

== See also ==
- Tetraphene, also known as benz[a]anthracene
- Tetracycline antibiotics

== Notes ==
- Oberhaus, Daniel (July 11, 2019). "New Designs Could Boost Solar Cells Beyond Their Limits". Wired.
