= Acene =

Class of chemical compounds

The general structural formula for acenes

In organic chemistry, the acenes or polyacenes are a class of organic compounds and polycyclic aromatic hydrocarbons made up of benzene (C_{6}H_{6}) rings which have been linearly fused. They follow the general molecular formula C_{4n+2}H_{2n+4}.

The larger representatives have potential interest in optoelectronic applications and are actively researched in chemistry and electrical engineering. Pentacene has been incorporated into organic field-effect transistors, reaching charge carrier mobilities as high as 5 cm^{2}/V s.

The first unsubstituted members are listed in the following table:

| Name | Number of rings | Molecular formula | Structural formula |
|---|---|---|---|
| Naphthalene | 2 | C_{10}H_{8} | |
| Anthracene | 3 | C_{14}H_{10} | |
| Tetracene | 4 | C_{18}H_{12} | |
| Pentacene | 5 | C_{22}H_{14} | |
| Hexacene | 6 | C_{26}H_{16} | |
| Heptacene | 7 | C_{30}H_{18} | |

Hexacene is not stable in air, and dimerises upon isolation. Heptacene (and larger acenes) is very reactive and has only been isolated in a matrix. However, bis(trialkylsilylethynylated) versions of heptacene have been isolated as crystalline solids.

== Larger acenes ==
Due to their increased conjugation length the larger acenes are also studied. Theoretically, a number of reports are available on longer chains using density functional methods. They are also building blocks for nanotubes and graphene. Unsubstituted octacene (n=8) and nonacene (n=9) have been detected in matrix isolation. The first reports of stable nonacene derivatives claimed that due to the electronic effects of the thioaryl substituents the compound is not a diradical but a closed-shell compound with the lowest HOMO–LUMO gap reported for any acene, an observation in violation of Kasha's rule. Subsequent work by others on different derivatives included crystal structures, with no such violations. The on-surface synthesis and characterization of unsubstituted, parent nonacene (n=9) and decacene (n=10) have been reported. In 2020, scientists reported about the creation of dodecacene (n=12) for the first time. Four years later, in the beginning of 2024, Ruan et al. succeeded in synthesizing unsubstituted tridecacene (n=13) on a (111)-gold surface. The acene was characterized by STM- and STS-measurements.

== Related compounds ==
The acene series have the consecutive rings linked in a linear chain, but other chain linkages are possible. The phenacenes have a zig-zag structure and the helicenes have a helical structure.

Macromolecular forms consisting of seven fused benzene rings

Heptacene

[7]Phenacene

M-heptahelicene

Benz[a]anthracene, an isomer of tetracene, has three rings connected in a line and one ring connected at an angle.
