= F-number (disambiguation) =

F-number is a measure of the light-gathering ability of an optical system such as a camera lens.

F-number may also refer to:

- F number (chemistry), a correlation number in the analysis of polycyclic aromatic hydrocarbons
- Fujita scale, a rating of a tornado's intensity by its impact on structures and vegetation
- Filial number in the cross-breeding of hybrid animals

== See also ==
- F-ratio (disambiguation)
- F scale (disambiguation)
- F1 (disambiguation)
- F2 (disambiguation)
- F3 (disambiguation)
- F15 (disambiguation)
- F150 (disambiguation)
