= C48H24 =

The molecular formula C_{48}H_{24} (molar mass: 600.70 g/mol, exact mass: 600.1878 u) may refer to:

- Hexa-cata-hexabenzocoronene
- Infinitene
- Kekulene
