= Dicoronylene =

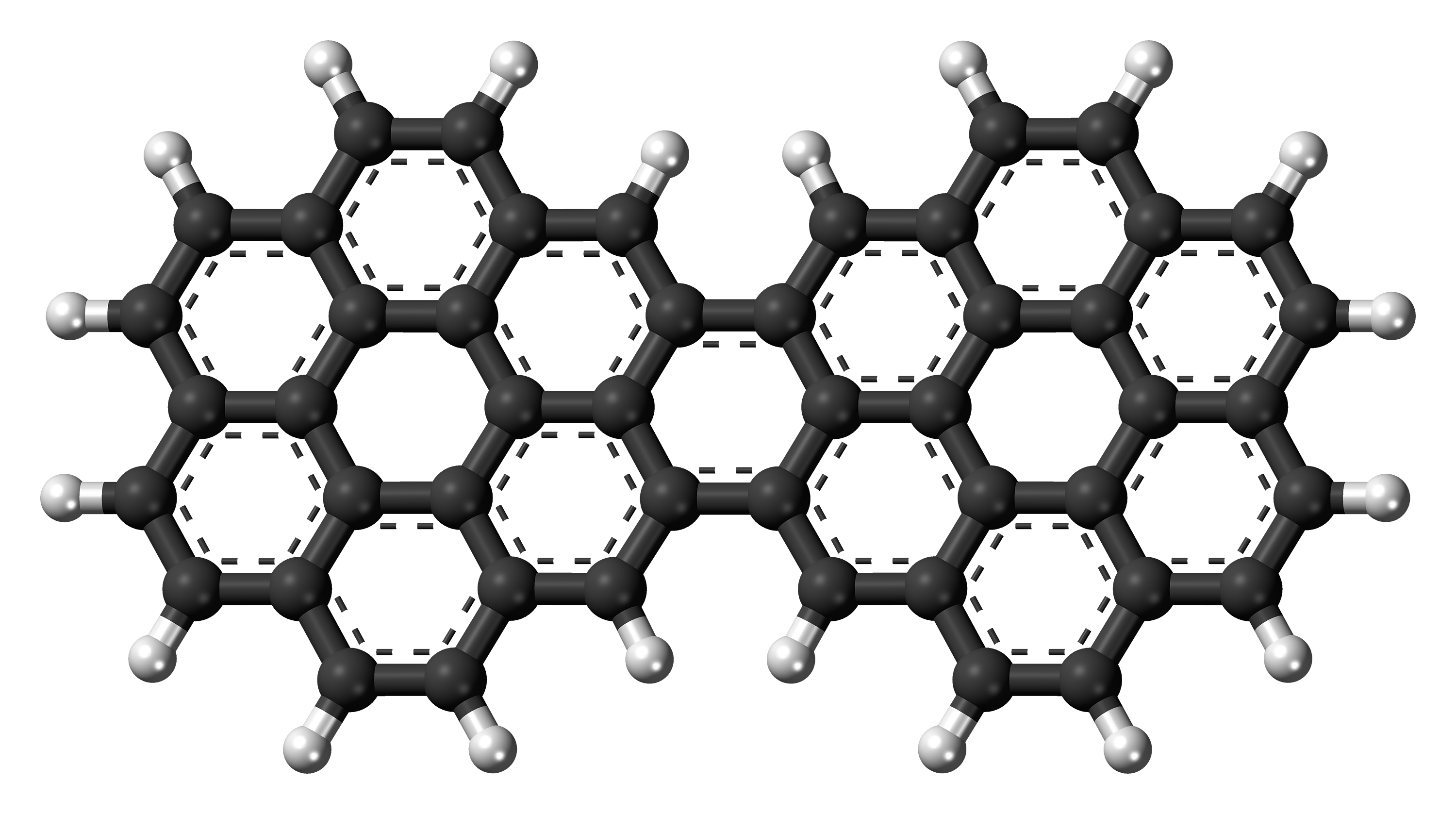

Names
- Preferred IUPAC name Benzo[1,2,3-bc:4,5,6-b′c′]dicoronene

Identifiers
CAS Number	98570-53-7
3D model (JSmol)	Interactive image
ChemSpider	551959
PubChem CID	636081
UNII	9BX8DTC7R5
CompTox Dashboard (EPA)	DTXSID40348352
- InChI: InChI=1S/C48H20/c1-5-23-9-13-27-17-31-33-19-29-15-11-25-7-3-22-4-8-26-12-16-30-20-34(46(33)48-43(29)39(25)36(22)40(26)44(30)48)32-18-28-14-10-24-6-2-21(1)35-37(23)41(27)47(45(31)32)42(28)38(24)35/h1-20H Key: QOPWDVCEMZLGPK-UHFFFAOYSA-N; InChI=1/C48H20/c1-5-23-9-13-27-17-31-33-19-29-15-11-25-7-3-22-4-8-26-12-16-30-20-34(46(33)48-43(29)39(25)36(22)40(26)44(30)48)32-18-28-14-10-24-6-2-21(1)35-37(23)41(27)47(45(31)32)42(28)38(24)35/h1-20H Key: QOPWDVCEMZLGPK-UHFFFAOYAN
- SMILES: C1=CC2=C3C4=C1C=CC5=C4C6=C(C=C5)C=C7C8=CC9=C1C4=C(C=CC5=C4C4=C(C=C5)C=CC5=CC(=C8C1=C54)C1=C7C6=C3C(=C1)C=C2)C=C9

Properties
Chemical formula	C_{48}H_{20}
Molar mass	596.688 g·mol^{−1}
Appearance	dark red
Density	1.57 g/cm^{3} (calc.)
Solubility in water	Insoluble
Solubility	Sparingly soluble in 1,2,4-trichlorobenzene

Structure
Space group	monoclinic, P2_{1}/c
Lattice constant	a = 1.0376(1) nm, b = 0.3832(1) nm, c = 3.1914(3) nm α = 90°, β = 90.24(1)°, γ = 90°
Formula units (Z)	2
- Except where otherwise noted, data are given for materials in their standard state (at 25 °C [77 °F], 100 kPa). verify (what is ?) Infobox references

Dicoronylene is the trivial name for a very large polycyclic aromatic hydrocarbon. It has 15 rings and is a brick-red solid. Its formula is C_{48}H_{20}. Dicoronylene sublimes under high vacuum, 0.001 torr, between 250 °C and 300 °C.

== Structure ==
Due to its large size and limited availability, the organic chemistry of dicoronylene is little known. Dicoronylene does undergo a Diels–Alder reaction with maleic anhydride on one or both of the central bay regions on either side of the bridging ring. The double bond of maleic anhydride forms two carbon–carbon bonds on the ends of the bay region, making a new six-membered ring. Heating with soda lime or chloranil removes the anhydride as carbon dioxide gas and gives the corresponding 16-ring and 17-ring PAHs.

== Occurrence ==
Dicoronylene was first observed in the solid residue produced in coal gasification. This residue contained large amounts of coronene and ovalene. After these were extracted and identified, a reddish residue remained, which was sparingly soluble in organic solvents. Elemental analysis indicated that it was most likely the condensed dimer of coronene.

Dicoronylene was later discovered to occur as a by-product of the catalytic hydrocracking used in petroleum processing. It is formed when two coronene molecules fuse in a Scholl condensation. It is estimated that catalytical hydrocracking produces several hundred metric tons of dicoronylene worldwide per year, making it the most prevalent large PAH. In this process, the analogous 18-ring PAH formed from coronene and ovalene (C_{56}H_{22}) is also formed in 1% to 20% proportions. It is purple in color.

== Properties ==
The formation of dicoronylene in hydrocracking reactors is a serious problem because its low solubility make it precipitate in any cooler part of the reactor flow path. This causes plugging of flow lines that require periodic shutdown and removal of the reddish deposits. Dicoronylene is also a constituent of coke formed on hydrocracking catalysts, which reduces their activity.

Thermal pyrolysis of coronene shows masses of dicoronylene and the condensed trimer, tetramer, and pentamer in the mass spectrum of the black product. These larger coronene condensates are black in color.

Dicoronylene is sparingly soluble in 1,2,4-trichlorobenzene and these solutions have a greenish yellow fluorescence. Unlike coronene, dicoronylene has symmetrical fluorescence excitation and emission spectra. It is virtually insoluble in most solvents.

Dicoronylene has been studied as a model for interstellar PAHs. Its large size and planarity have also shown promise as a chromatographic separation material.
