= F scale =

F scale may refer to:

- F-scale (personality test), a personality test that attempts to quantify authoritarian tendencies
- Fujita scale, a system of rating of a tornado's intensity by its impact on structures and vegetation
- F scale (modelling), a 1:20.3 scaled gauge track used with model trains
- F Scale, a validity scale of the Minnesota Multiphasic Personality Inventory
- the F major scale.

== See also ==
- F-number (disambiguation)
- F-ratio (disambiguation)
