= Circumcoronene =

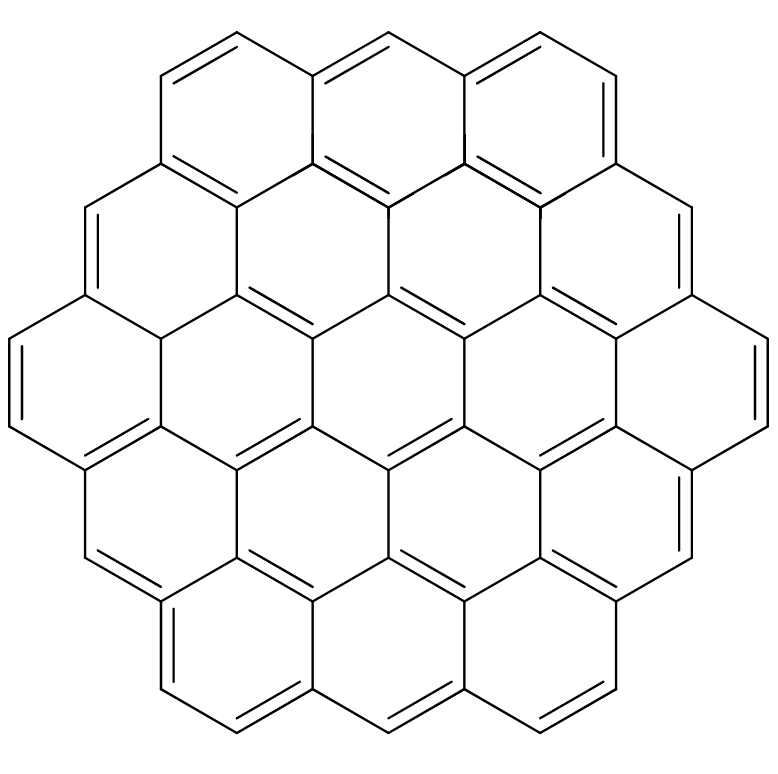

Names
- IUPAC name nonadecacyclo[27.23.1.1^{4,44}.0^{6,43}.0^{9,42}.0^{11,40}.0^{14,39}.0^{16,37}.0^{19,36}.0^{21,34}.0^{24,33}.0^{26,31}.0^{30,51}.0^{32,49}.0^{35,48}.0^{38,47}.0^{41,46}.0^{45,50}.0^{52,54}]tetrapentaconta-1(53),2,4,6(43),7,9,11(40),12,14,16(37),17,19(36),20,22,24(33),25,27,29,31,34,38,41,44,46,48,50,52(54)-heptacosaene
- Other names: Circumcoronene; Dodecabenzocoronene; Coronene 19; Tripyreno[2,1,10,9,8,7-defghij:2′,1′,10′,9′,8′,7′-nopqrst:2″,1″,10″,9″,8″,7″-xyza_{1}b_{1}c_{1}d_{1}]trinaphthylene

Identifiers
CAS Number	72210-95-8
3D model (JSmol)	Interactive image
Beilstein Reference	2495518
ChEBI	CHEBI:51386
ChemSpider	21865866
Gmelin Reference	2653231
PubChem CID	25137954
CompTox Dashboard (EPA)	DTXSID301108666
- InChI: InChI=1S/C54H18/c1-2-20-14-22-5-6-24-16-26-9-11-29-18-30-12-10-28-17-27-8-7-25-15-23-4-3-21-13-19(1)31-32(20)44-34(22)36(24)46-39(26)41(29)48-42(30)40(28)47-38(27)37(25)45-35(23)33(21)43(31)49-50(44)52(46)54(48)53(47)51(45)49/h1-18H Key: ICKDBJSKNOTKDQ-UHFFFAOYSA-N
- SMILES: c1cc2cc3ccc4cc5ccc6cc7ccc8cc9ccc%10cc%11ccc%12cc1c1c2c2c3c4c3c5c6c4c7c8c5c9c%10c6c%11c%12c1c1c2c3c4c5c61

Properties
Chemical formula	C_{54}H_{18}
Molar mass	666.738 g·mol^{−1}
- Except where otherwise noted, data are given for materials in their standard state (at 25 °C [77 °F], 100 kPa). Infobox references

Circumcoronene is a polycyclic aromatic hydrocarbon with the molecular formula C_{54}H_{18}. It consists of a central coronene molecule circumscribed by benzene on the periphery.

Circumcoronene is the third benzenoid hydrocarbon in the benzene-coronene-circumcoronene series. It comes after benzene and coronene, and is followed by circumcircumcoronene. Various topological and mathematical properties have been computed for molecules in this series.

On-surface synthesis of circumcoronene was achieved in 2021 via intramolecular dehydrogenation of a precursor hexa-peri-hexabenzocoronene, followed by methyl radical coupling and aromatization, on a Cu(111) surface. A solution-phase synthesis was reported in 2023 via acid-mediated cyclization of alkynes, confirmed via X-ray crystallographic analysis and NMR measurement.
