= Ovalene =

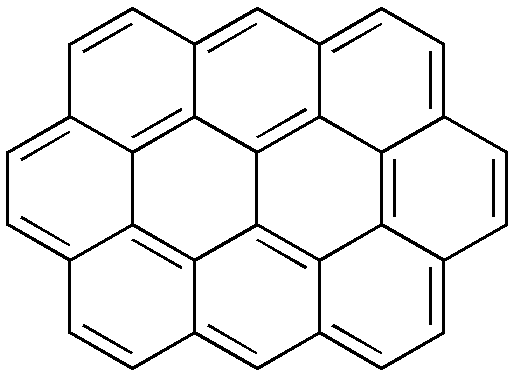

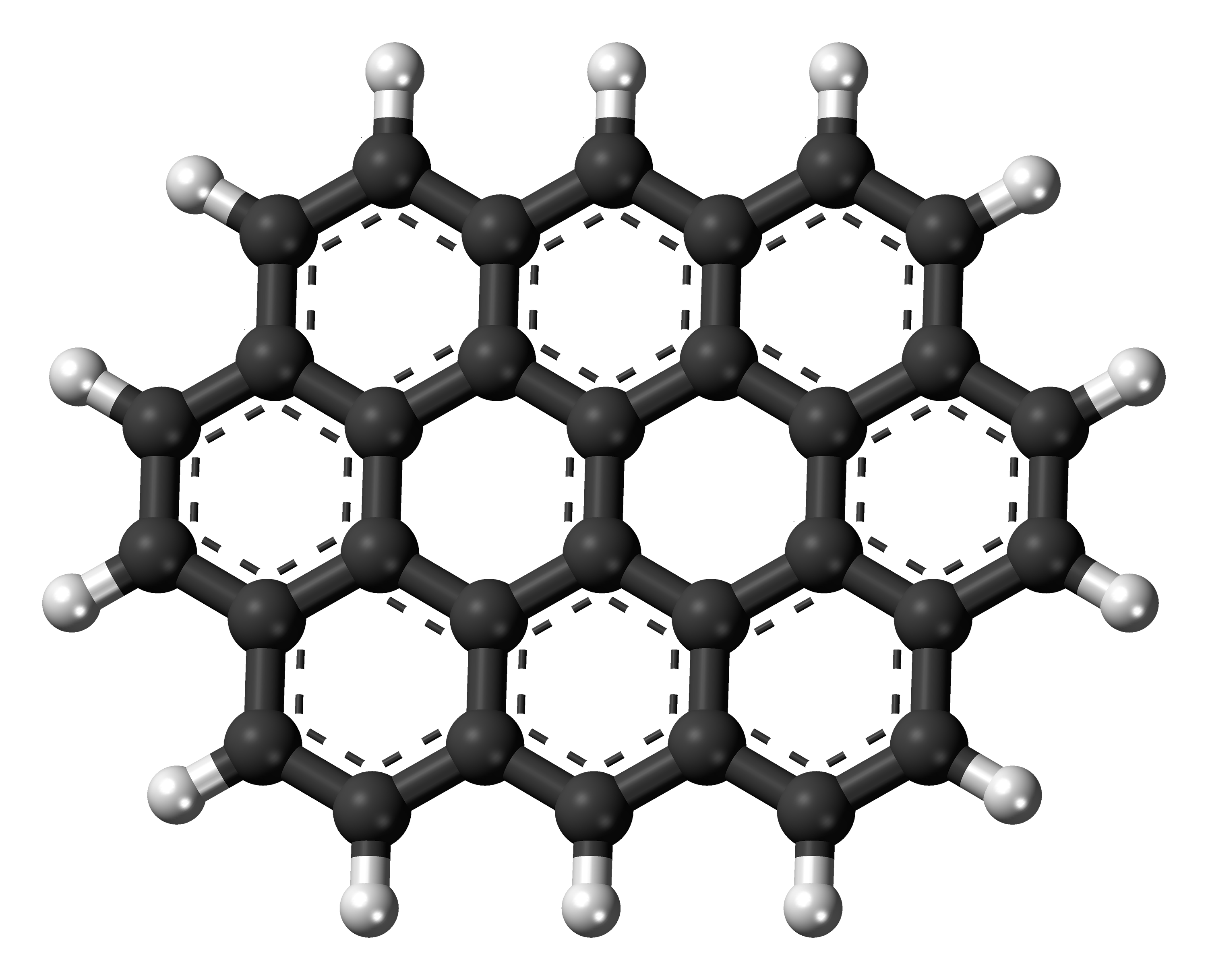

Names
- Preferred IUPAC name Ovalene

Identifiers
CAS Number	190-26-1
3D model (JSmol)	Interactive image
ChEBI	CHEBI:33091
ChemSpider	60771
ECHA InfoCard	100.005.347
EC Number	205-880-1
PubChem CID	67446
UNII	3M1901484G
CompTox Dashboard (EPA)	DTXSID90172447
- InChI: InChI=1S/C32H14/c1-2-16-6-10-20-14-22-12-8-18-4-3-17-7-11-21-13-19-9-5-15(1)23-24(16)28(20)32-30(22)26(18)25(17)29(21)31(32)27(19)23/h1-14H Key: LSQODMMMSXHVCN-UHFFFAOYSA-N; InChI=1/C32H14/c1-2-16-6-10-20-14-22-12-8-18-4-3-17-7-11-21-13-19-9-5-15(1)23-24(16)28(20)32-30(22)26(18)25(17)29(21)31(32)27(19)23/h1-14H Key: LSQODMMMSXHVCN-UHFFFAOYAN
- SMILES: c1cc2c3c4c1ccc5cc6c7c8c(ccc9=c8c1c(cc9)cc(c3c1c7c54)cc2)cc6

Properties
Chemical formula	C_{32}H_{14}
Molar mass	398.45 g/mol
Density	1.496 g/cm^{3}
Melting point	473 °C (883 °F; 746 K)
Magnetic susceptibility (χ)	−353.8·10^{−6} cm^{3}/mol

Structure
Space group	monoclinic, P2_{1}/a
Lattice constant	a = 1.947(5) nm, b = 0.470(1) nm, c = 1.012(4) nm α = 90°, β = 105.0(3)°, γ = 90°
Formula units (Z)	2
- Except where otherwise noted, data are given for materials in their standard state (at 25 °C [77 °F], 100 kPa). verify (what is ?) Infobox references

Ovalene is a polycyclic aromatic hydrocarbon with the formula C_{32}H_{14}, which consists of ten peri-fused six-membered rings. It is very similar to coronene.

Ovalene is a reddish-orange compound. It is sparingly soluble in solvents such as benzene, toluene, and dichloromethane. Its solutions have a green fluorescence under UV light.

Ovalene has been shown to form in deep-sea hydrothermal vent areas and in the hydrocracking process of petroleum refining.
