= Benzo(ghi)perylene =

Chemical compound

Benzo[ghi]perylene
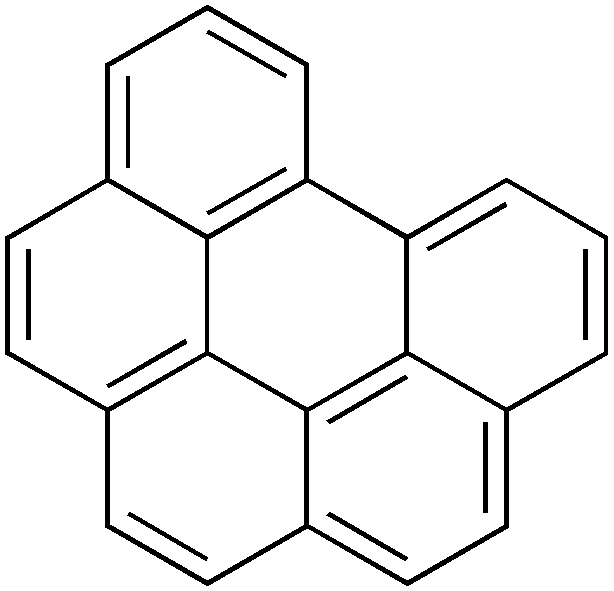
- Skeletal formula

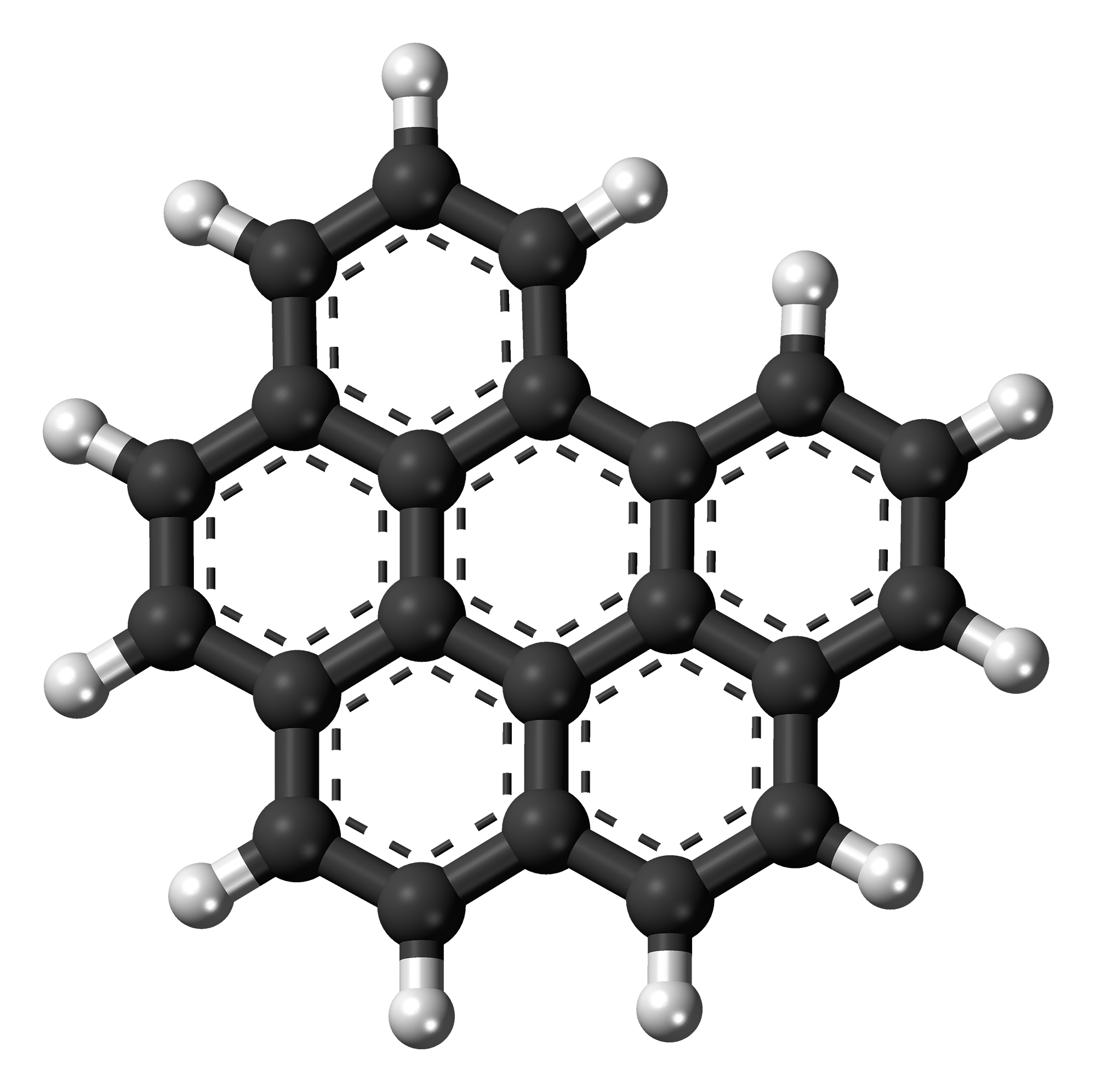

Names
- Preferred IUPAC name Benzo[ghi]perylene

Identifiers
CAS Number	191-24-2
3D model (JSmol)	Interactive image
ChemSpider	8763
ECHA InfoCard	100.005.350
EC Number	205-883-8
KEGG	C14318
PubChem CID	9117
RTECS number	DI6200500
UNII	5ZME2E2Q9L
UN number	3077, 3082
CompTox Dashboard (EPA)	DTXSID5023908
- InChI: InChI=1S/C22H12/c1-3-13-7-9-15-11-12-16-10-8-14-4-2-6-18-17(5-1)19(13)21(15)22(16)20(14)18/h1-12H Key: GYFAGKUZYNFMBN-UHFFFAOYSA-N; InChI=1/C22H12/c1-3-13-7-9-15-11-12-16-10-8-14-4-2-6-18-17(5-1)19(13)21(15)22(16)20(14)18/h1-12H Key: GYFAGKUZYNFMBN-UHFFFAOYAH
- SMILES: c1cc2ccc3ccc4ccc5cccc6c5c4c3c2c6c1

Properties
Chemical formula	C_{22}H_{12}
Molar mass	276.3307
Appearance	solid
Density	1.378 g/cm^{3}
Melting point	278 °C (532 °F; 551 K)
Boiling point	500 °C (932 °F; 773 K)

Hazards
- GHS labelling
Pictograms	(GHS09: Environmental hazard)
Signal word	Warning
Hazard statements	H410, H413
Precautionary statements	P273, P391, P501
Flash point	247.2 °C (477.0 °F; 520.3 K)
- Except where otherwise noted, data are given for materials in their standard state (at 25 °C [77 °F], 100 kPa). verify (what is ?) Infobox references

Benzo[ghi]perylene is a polycyclic aromatic hydrocarbon with the chemical formula C_{22}H_{12}.

== Occurrence and safety ==
Benzo[ghi]perylene occurs naturally in crude oil and coal tar. It is a product of incomplete combustion and is found in tobacco smoke, automobile exhausts, industrial emissions, grilled meat products and edible oils. In the atmosphere, it is adsorbed to particles and is deposited into the soil and water.

The compound accumulates strongly in organisms and the environment, and is suspected to be mutagenic and carcinogenic. It is one of 16 PAHs included in the EPA list of priority pollutants.

Hokkaidoite, a natural crystalline mineral of this compound, is found in Hokkaido, Japan.

== See also ==
- Hokkaidoite
