= Polycyclic aromatic hydrocarbon =

Hydrocarbon composed of multiple aromatic rings

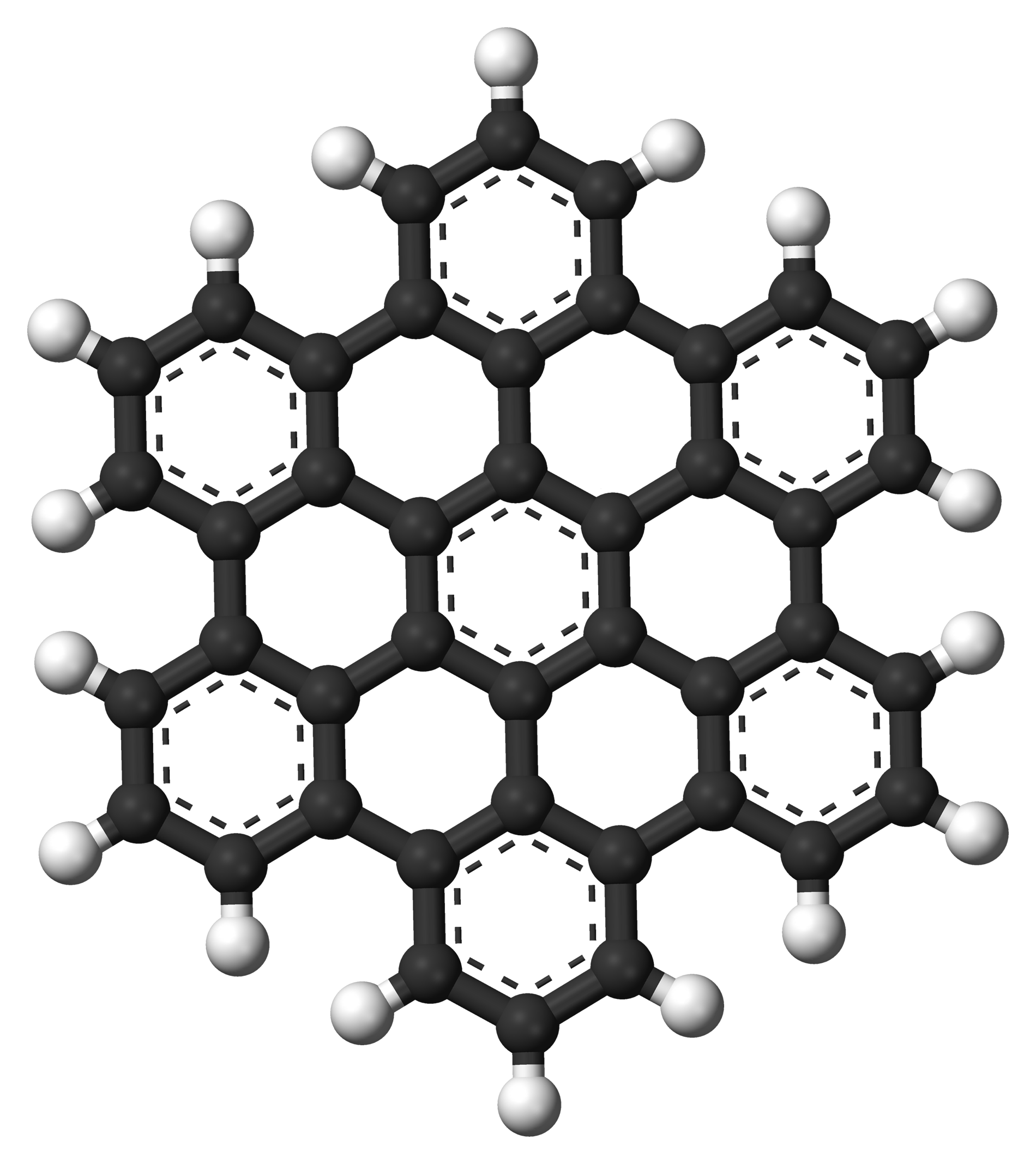

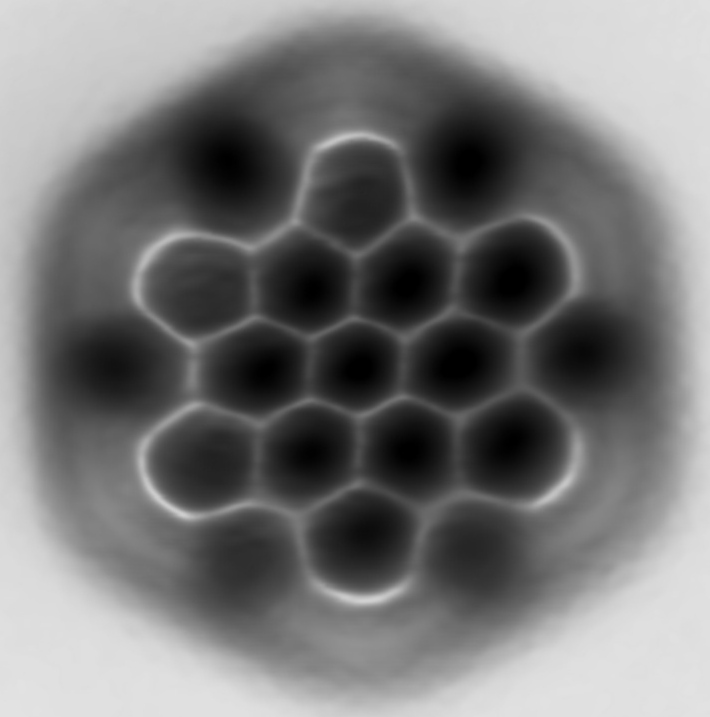
Three representations of hexabenzocoronene, a polycyclic aromatic hydrocarbon. Top: standard line-angle schematic, where carbon atoms are represented by the vertices of the hexagons and hydrogen atoms are inferred. Middle: ball-and-stick model showing all carbon and hydrogen atoms. Bottom: atomic force microscopy image.

A polycyclic aromatic hydrocarbon (PAH) is any member of a class of organic compounds that is composed of multiple fused aromatic rings. Most are produced by the incomplete combustion of organic matter—by engine exhaust fumes, tobacco, incinerators, in roasted meats and cereals, or when biomass burns at lower temperatures as in forest fires. The simplest representative is naphthalene, having two aromatic rings, and the three-ring compounds anthracene and phenanthrene. PAHs are uncharged, non-polar and planar. Many are colorless. Many of them are also found in fossil fuel deposits such as coal and in petroleum. Exposure to PAHs can lead to different types of cancer, fetal development complications, and cardiovascular issues.

Polycyclic aromatic hydrocarbons are discussed as possible starting materials for abiotic syntheses of materials required by the earliest forms of life.

== Nomenclature and structure ==
The terms polyaromatic hydrocarbon, or polynuclear aromatic hydrocarbon (abbreviated as PNA) are also used for this concept.

By definition, polycyclic aromatic hydrocarbons have multiple aromatic rings, precluding benzene from being considered a PAH. Sources such as the US EPA and CDC consider naphthalene to be the simplest PAH. Most authors exclude compounds that include heteroatoms in the rings, or carry substituents.

A polyaromatic hydrocarbon may have rings of various sizes, including some that are not aromatic. Those that have only six-membered rings are said to be alternant.

The following sets of examples illustrate several of the types of variations that are possible.

Acenes

Naphthalene

Anthracene

Tetracene

Pentacene
Phenacenes

Phenanthrene

Chrysene

Picene
Catacondensed benzenoid hydrocarbons

Triphenylene

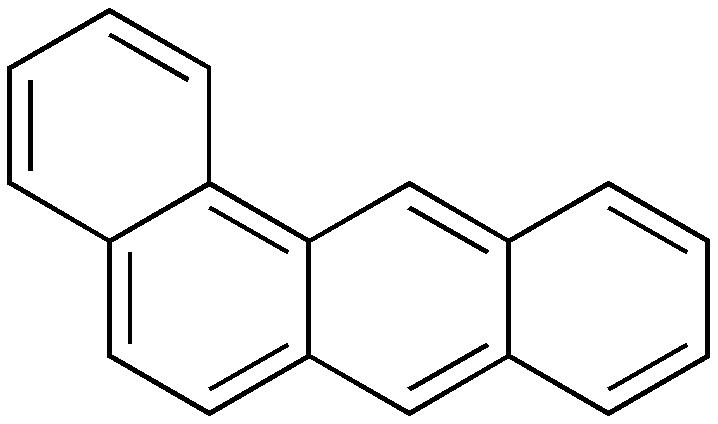
Benz[a]anthracene

Dibenz[a,h]anthracene
Pericondensed benzenoid hydrocarbons

Phenalene

Pyrene

Benzo[a]pyrene

Perylene

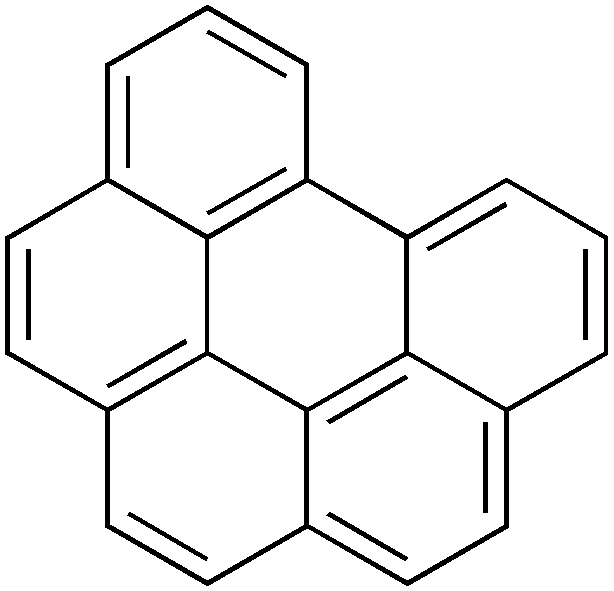
Benzo[ghi]perylene
Non-benzenoid hydrocarbons

Biphenylene

Fluorene

Acenaphthene

Acenaphthylene

Fluoranthene
Helicenes

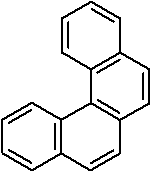
[4]Helicene

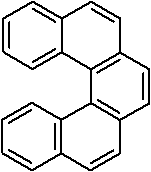
[5]Helicene

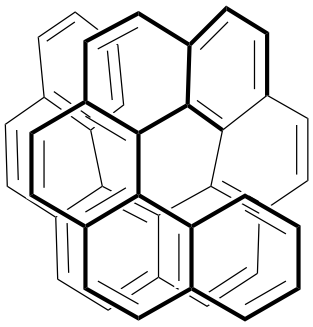
[10]Helicene
Circulenes

Corannulene

Coronene

Kekulene
Large networks

Ovalene

Hexabenzocoronene

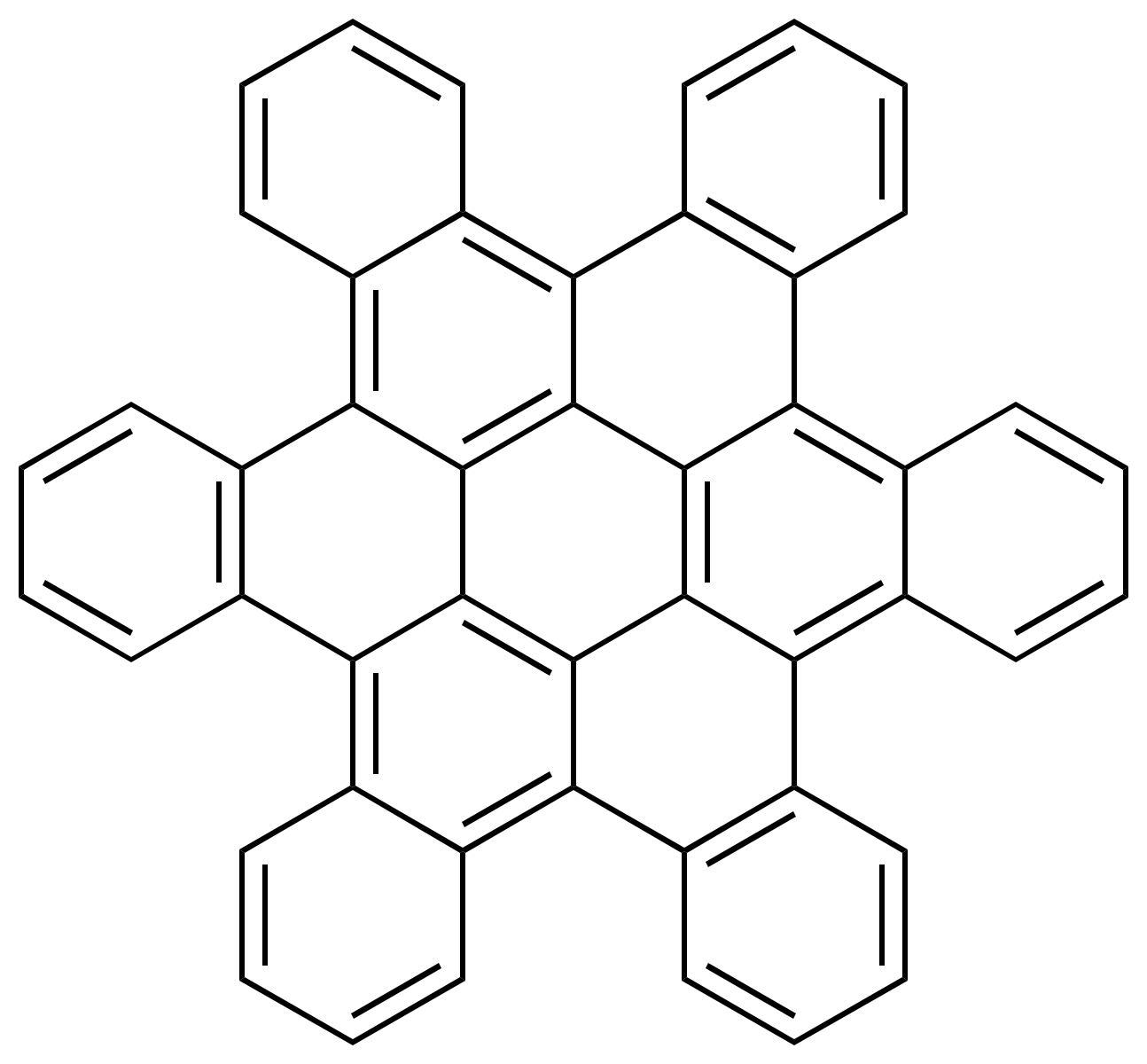
Hexa-cata-hexabenzocoronene

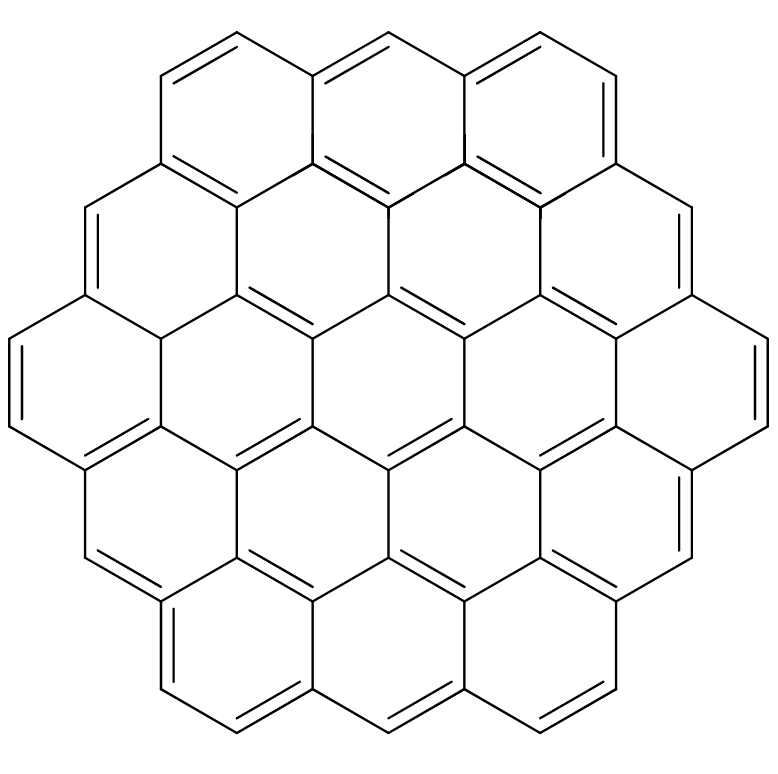
Circumcoronene

=== Geometry ===
Most PAHs, like naphthalene, anthracene, and coronene, are planar. This geometry is a consequence of the fact that the σ-bonds that result from the merger of sp^{2} hybrid orbitals of adjacent carbons lie on the same plane as the carbon atom. Those compounds are achiral, since the plane of the molecule is a symmetry plane.

In rare cases, PAHs are not planar. In some cases, the non-planarity may be forced by the topology of the molecule and the stiffness (in length and angle) of the carbon–carbon bonds. For example, unlike coronene, corannulene adopts a bowl shape in order to reduce the bond stress. The two possible configurations, concave and convex, are separated by a relatively low energy barrier (about 11 kcal/mol).

In theory, there are 51 structural isomers of coronene that have six fused benzene rings in a cyclic sequence, with two edge carbons shared between successive rings. All of them must be non-planar and have considerable higher bonding energy (computed to be at least 130 kcal/mol) than coronene; as of 2002, none of them had been synthesized.

Other PAHs that might seem to be planar, considering only the carbon skeleton, may be distorted by repulsion or steric hindrance between the hydrogen atoms in their periphery. Benzo[c]phenanthrene, with four rings fused in a "C" shape, has a slight helical distortion due to repulsion between the closest pair of hydrogen atoms in the two extremal rings. This effect also causes distortion of picene.

Adding another benzene ring to form dibenzo[c,g]phenanthrene creates steric hindrance between the two extreme hydrogen atoms. Adding two more rings on the same sense yields heptahelicene in which the two extreme rings overlap. These non-planar forms are chiral, and their enantiomers can be isolated.

=== Benzenoid hydrocarbons ===
The benzenoid hydrocarbons have been defined as condensed polycyclic unsaturated fully-conjugated hydrocarbons whose molecules are essentially planar with all rings six-membered. Full conjugation means that all carbon atoms and carbon-carbon bonds must have the sp^{2} structure of benzene. This class is largely a subset of the alternant PAHs, but is considered to include unstable or hypothetical compounds like triangulene or heptacene.

As of 2012, over 300 benzenoid hydrocarbons had been isolated and characterized.

== Bonding and aromaticity ==
The aromaticity varies for PAHs. According to Clar's rule, the resonance structure of a PAH that has the largest number of disjoint aromatic pi sextets—i.e. benzene-like moieties—is the most important for the characterization of the properties of that PAH.

Benzene-substructure resonance analysis for Clar's rule

Phenanthrene

Anthracene

Chrysene

For example, phenanthrene has two Clar structures: one with just one aromatic sextet (the middle ring), and the other with two (the first and third rings). The latter case is therefore the more characteristic electronic nature of the two. Therefore, in this molecule the outer rings have greater aromatic character whereas the central ring is less aromatic and therefore more reactive. In contrast, in anthracene the resonance structures have one sextet each, which can be at any of the three rings, and the aromaticity spreads out more evenly across the whole molecule. This difference in number of sextets is reflected in the differing ultraviolet–visible spectra of these two isomers, as higher Clar pi-sextets are associated with larger HOMO–LUMO gaps; the highest-wavelength absorbance of phenanthrene is at 293 nm, while anthracene is at 374 nm. Three Clar structures with two sextets each are present in the four-ring chrysene structure: one having sextets in the first and third rings, one in the second and fourth rings, and one in the first and fourth rings. Superposition of these structures reveals that the aromaticity in the outer rings is greater (each has a sextet in two of the three Clar structures) compared to the inner rings (each has a sextet in only one of the three).

== Properties ==
=== Physicochemical ===
PAHs are nonpolar and lipophilic. Larger PAHs are generally insoluble in water, although some smaller PAHs are soluble. The larger members are also poorly soluble in organic solvents and in lipids. The larger members, such as perylene, are strongly colored.

=== Redox ===
Polycyclic aromatic compounds characteristically yield radicals and anions upon treatment with alkali metals. The large PAH form dianions as well. The redox potential correlates with the size of the PAH.

Half-cell potential of aromatic compounds against the SCE (Fc^{+/0})
Compound	Potential (V)
benzene	−3.42
biphenyl	−2.60 (−3.18)
naphthalene	−2.51 (−3.1)
anthracene	−1.96 (−2.5)
phenanthrene	−2.46
perylene	−1.67 (−2.2)
pentacene	−1.35

== Sources ==
=== Artificial ===
The dominant sources of PAHs in the environment are from human activity: wood-burning and combustion of other biofuels such as dung or crop residues contribute more than half of annual global PAH emissions, particularly due to biofuel use in India and China. As of 2004, industrial processes and the extraction and use of fossil fuels made up slightly more than one quarter of global PAH emissions, dominating outputs in industrial countries such as the United States.

A year-long sampling campaign in Athens, Greece found a third (31%) of PAH urban air pollution to be caused by wood-burning, like diesel and oil (33%) and gasoline (29%). It also found that wood-burning is responsible for nearly half (43%) of annual PAH cancer-risk (carcinogenic potential) compared to the other sources and that wintertime PAH levels were 7 times higher than in other seasons, especially if atmospheric dispersion is low.

Lower-temperature combustion, such as tobacco smoking or wood-burning, tends to generate low molecular weight PAHs, whereas high-temperature industrial processes typically generate PAHs with higher molecular weights. Incense is also a source.

PAHs are typically found as complex mixtures.

=== Natural ===
==== Natural fires ====
PAHs may result from the incomplete combustion of organic matter in natural wildfires. Substantially higher outdoor air, soil, and water concentrations of PAHs have been measured in Asia, Africa, and Latin America than in Europe, Australia, the U.S., and Canada.

==== Fossil carbon ====
Polycyclic aromatic hydrocarbons are primarily found in natural sources such as bitumen.

PAHs can also be produced geologically when organic sediments are chemically transformed into fossil fuels such as oil and coal. The rare minerals idrialite, curtisite, and carpathite consist almost entirely of PAHs that originated from such sediments, that were extracted, processed, separated, and deposited by very hot fluids. High levels of such PAHs have been detected in the Cretaceous–Tertiary (K–T) boundary, more than 100 times the level in adjacent layers. The spike was attributed to massive fires that consumed about 20% of the terrestrial above-ground biomass in a very short time.

==== Extraterrestrial ====
PAHs are prevalent in the interstellar medium (ISM) of galaxies in both the nearby and distant Universe and make up a dominant emission mechanism in the mid-infrared wavelength range, containing as much as 10% of the total integrated infrared luminosity of galaxies. PAHs generally trace regions of cold molecular gas, which are optimum environments for the formation of stars.

NASA's Spitzer Space Telescope and James Webb Space Telescope include instruments for obtaining both images and spectra of light emitted by PAHs associated with star formation. These images can trace the surface of star-forming clouds in our own galaxy or identify star forming galaxies in the distant universe. In June 2013, PAHs were detected in the upper atmosphere of Titan, the largest moon of the planet Saturn.

==== Minor sources ====
Volcanic eruptions may emit PAHs.

Certain PAHs such as perylene can also be generated in anaerobic sediments from existing organic material, although it remains undetermined whether abiotic or microbial processes drive their production.

== Biodegradation ==
Algae and some invertebrates such as protozoans, mollusks, and polychaetes have limited ability to metabolize PAHs. Some such organisms bioaccumulate disproportionate concentrations of PAHs in their tissues. PAH metabolism can vary substantially across invertebrate species. Most vertebrates metabolize and excrete PAHs relatively rapidly. Tissue concentrations of PAHs do not increase (biomagnify) from the lowest to highest levels of food chains.

PAHs transform slowly to a wide range of degradation products. Biological degradation by microbes is a dominant form of PAH transformation in the environment. Soil-consuming invertebrates such as earthworms are claimed to speed PAH degradation, either through direct metabolism or by improving the conditions for microbial transformations. Abiotic degradation in the atmosphere and the top layers of surface waters can produce nitrogenated, halogenated, hydroxylated, and oxygenated PAHs; some of these compounds can be more toxic, water-soluble, and mobile than their parent PAHs.

== Distribution in the environment ==
=== Aquatic environments ===
Most PAHs are insoluble in water, which limits their mobility in the environment, although PAHs sorb to fine-grained organic-rich sediments. Aqueous solubility of PAHs decreases approximately logarithmically as molecular mass increases.

Two-ringed PAHs, and to a lesser extent three-ringed PAHs, dissolve in water, making them more available for biological uptake and degradation. Further, two- to four-ringed PAHs volatilize sufficiently to appear in the atmosphere predominantly in gaseous form, although the physical state of four-ring PAHs can depend on temperature. In contrast, compounds with five or more rings have low solubility in water and low volatility; they are therefore predominantly in solid state, bound to particulate air pollution, soils, or sediments. In solid state, these compounds are less accessible for biological uptake or degradation, increasing their persistence in the environment.

=== Human exposure ===
Human exposure varies across the globe and depends on factors such as smoking rates, fuel types in cooking, and pollution controls on power plants, industrial processes, and vehicles. Developed countries with stricter air and water pollution controls, cleaner sources of cooking (that is, gas and electricity versus coal or biofuels), and prohibitions of public smoking tend to have lower levels of PAH exposure, while developing and undeveloped countries tend to have higher levels. Surgical smoke plumes have been proven to contain PAHs in several independent research studies.

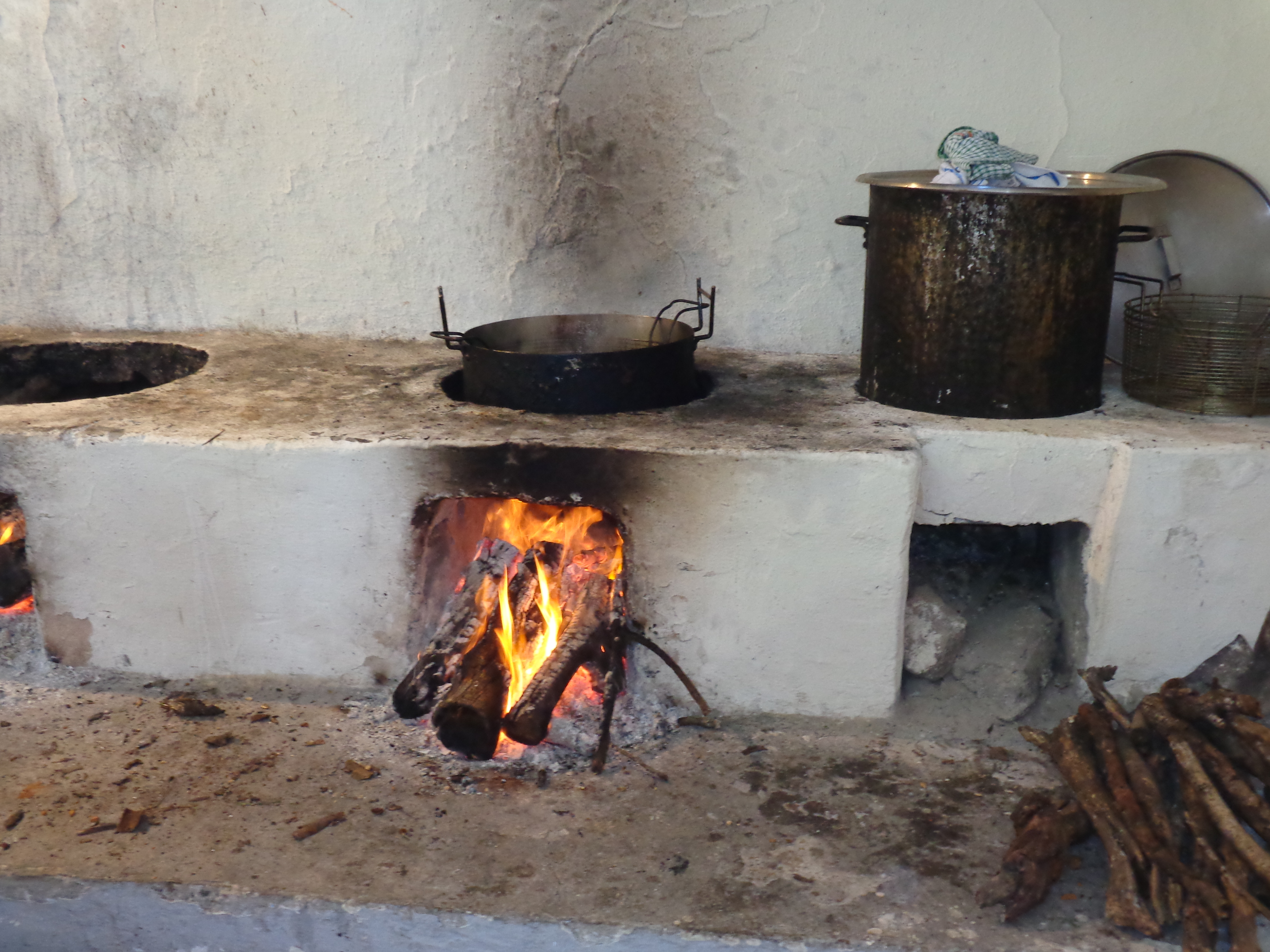
A wood-burning open-air cooking stove. Smoke from solid fuels like wood is a large source of PAHs globally.

Burning solid fuels such as coal and biofuels in the home for cooking and heating is a dominant global source of PAH emissions that in developing countries leads to high levels of exposure to indoor particulate air pollution containing PAHs, particularly for women and children who spend more time in the home or cooking.

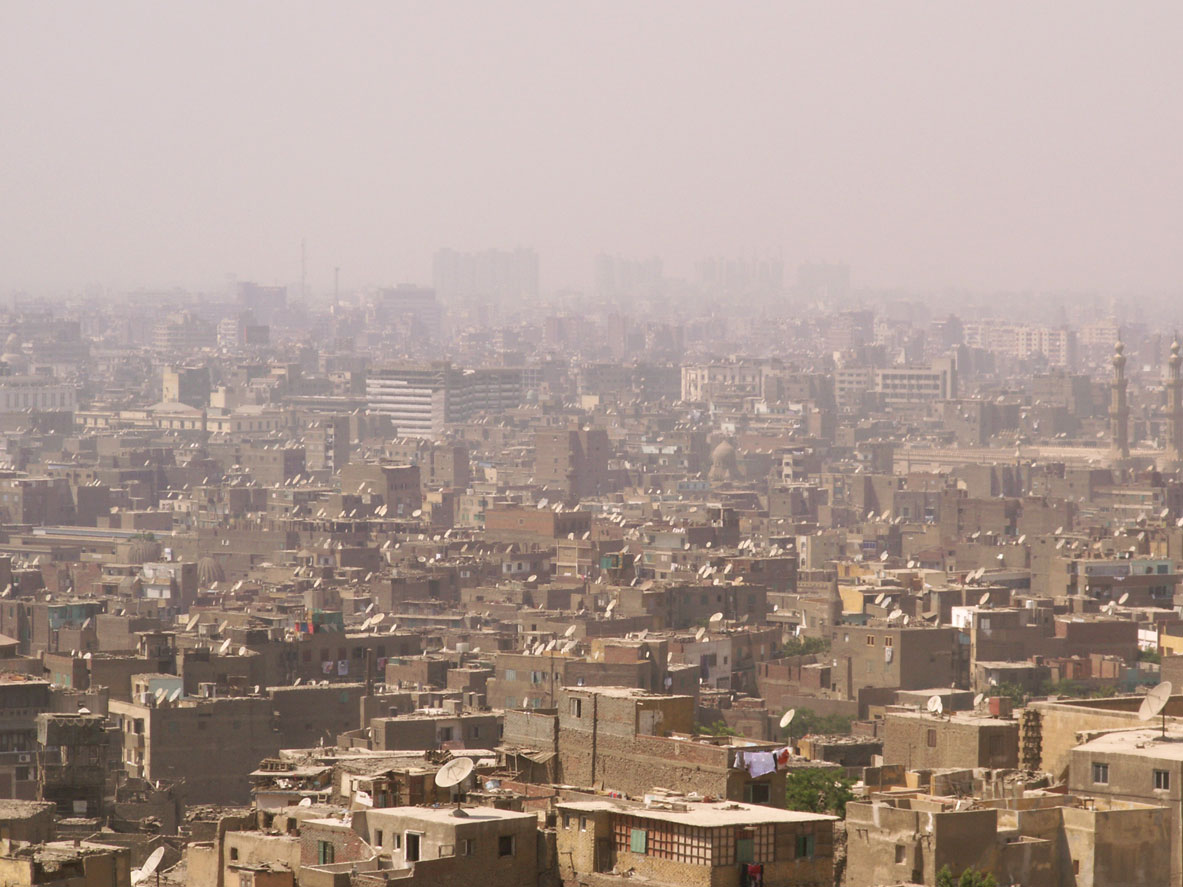
Smog in Cairo. Particulate air pollution, including smog, is a substantial cause of human exposure to PAHs.

Emissions from vehicles such as cars and trucks can be a substantial outdoor source of PAHs in particulate air pollution. Geographically, major roadways are thus sources of PAHs, which may distribute in the atmosphere or deposit nearby. Catalytic converters are estimated to reduce PAH emissions from gasoline-fired vehicles by 25-fold.

People can also be occupationally exposed from using fossil fuels or their derivatives, wood-burning, carbon electrodes, or exposure to diesel exhaust. Industrial activity that can produce and distribute PAHs includes aluminum, iron, and steel manufacturing; coal gasification, tar distillation, shale oil extraction; production of coke, creosote, carbon black, and calcium carbide; road paving and asphalt manufacturing; rubber tire production; manufacturing or use of metal working fluids; and activity of coal or natural gas power stations.

In industrial countries, people who smoke tobacco products, or who are exposed to second-hand smoke, are among the most highly exposed groups; tobacco smoke contributes to 90% of indoor PAH levels in the homes of smokers. For the general population in developed countries, the diet is otherwise the dominant source of PAH exposure, particularly from smoking or grilling meat or consuming PAHs deposited on plant foods, especially broad-leafed vegetables, during growth. Exposure also occurs through drinking alcohol aged in charred barrels, flavored with peat smoke, or made with roasted grains. PAHs are typically at low concentrations in drinking water.

=== Environmental pollution ===
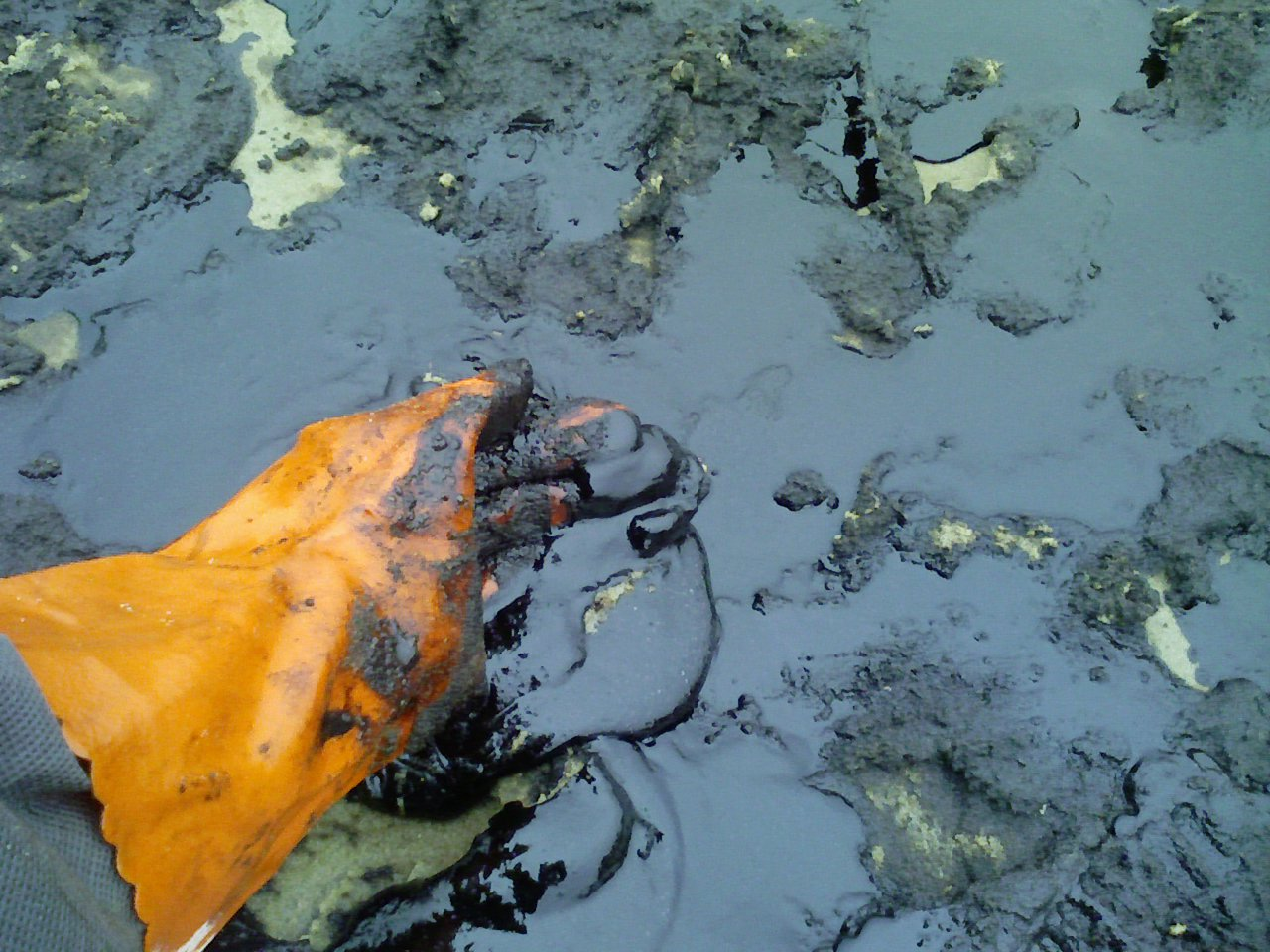
Crude oil on a beach after a 2007 oil spill in Korea.

PAHs typically disperse from urban and suburban non-point sources through road runoff, sewage, and atmospheric circulation and subsequent deposition of particulate air pollution. Soil and river sediment near industrial sites such as creosote manufacturing facilities can be highly contaminated with PAHs. Oil spills, creosote, coal mining dust, and other fossil fuel sources can also distribute PAHs in the environment.

Two- and three-ringed PAHs can disperse widely while dissolved in water or as gases in the atmosphere, while PAHs with higher molecular weights can disperse locally or regionally adhered to particulate matter that is suspended in air or water until the particles land or settle out of the water column. PAHs have a strong affinity for organic carbon, and thus highly organic sediments in rivers, lakes, and the ocean can be a substantial sink for PAHs.

=== Urban soils ===
The British Geological Survey reported the amount and distribution of PAH compounds including parent and alkylated forms in urban soils at 76 locations in Greater London. The study showed that parent (16 PAH) content ranged from 4 to 67 mg/kg (dry soil weight) and an average PAH concentration of 18 mg/kg (dry soil weight) whereas the total PAH content (33 PAH) ranged from 6 to 88 mg/kg and fluoranthene and pyrene were generally the most abundant PAHs. Benzo[a]pyrene (BaP), the most toxic of the parent PAHs, is widely considered a key marker PAH for environmental assessments; the normal background concentration of BaP in the London urban sites was 6.9 mg/kg (dry soil weight). London soils contained more stable four- to six-ringed PAHs which were indicative of combustion and pyrolytic sources, such as coal and oil burning and traffic-sourced particulates. However, the overall distribution also suggested that the PAHs in London soils had undergone weathering and been modified by a variety of pre-and post-depositional processes such as volatilization and microbial biodegradation.

=== Peatlands ===
Managed burning of moorland vegetation in the UK has been shown to generate PAHs which become incorporated into the peat surface. Burning of moorland vegetation such as heather initially generates high amounts of two- and three-ringed PAHs relative to four- to six-ringed PAHs in surface sediments, however, this pattern is reversed as the lower molecular weight PAHs are attenuated by biotic decay and photodegradation. Evaluation of the PAH distributions using statistical methods such as principal component analyses (PCA) enabled the study to link the source (burnt moorland) to pathway (suspended stream sediment) to the depositional sink (reservoir bed).

=== Rivers, estuarine and coastal sediments ===
Concentrations of PAHs in river and estuarine sediments vary according to a variety of factors including proximity to municipal and industrial discharge points, wind direction and distance from major urban roadways, as well as tidal regime which controls the diluting effect of generally cleaner marine sediments relative to freshwater discharge. Consequently, the concentrations of pollutants in estuaries tends to decrease at the river mouth. Understanding of sediment hosted PAHs in estuaries is important for the protection of commercial fisheries (such as mussels) and general environmental habitat conservation because PAHs can impact the health of suspension and sediment feeding organism. River-estuary surface sediments in the UK tend to have a lower PAH content than sediments buried 10–60 cm from the surface reflecting lower present day industrial activity combined with improvement in environmental legislation of PAH. Typical PAH concentrations in UK estuaries range from about 19 to 16,163 µg/kg (dry sediment weight) in the River Clyde and 626 to 3,766 µg/kg in the River Mersey. In general estuarine sediments with a higher natural total organic carbon content (TOC) tend to accumulate PAHs due to high sorption capacity of organic matter. A similar correspondence between PAHs and TOC has also been observed in the sediments of tropical mangroves located on the coast of southern China.

== Human health ==
Cancer is a primary human health risk of exposure to PAHs. Exposure to PAHs has also been linked with cardiovascular disease and poor fetal development.

=== Cancer ===
PAHs have been linked to skin, lung, bladder, liver, and stomach cancers in well-established animal model studies. Specific compounds classified by various agencies as possible or probable human carcinogens are identified in the section "Regulation and Oversight" below.

==== History ====
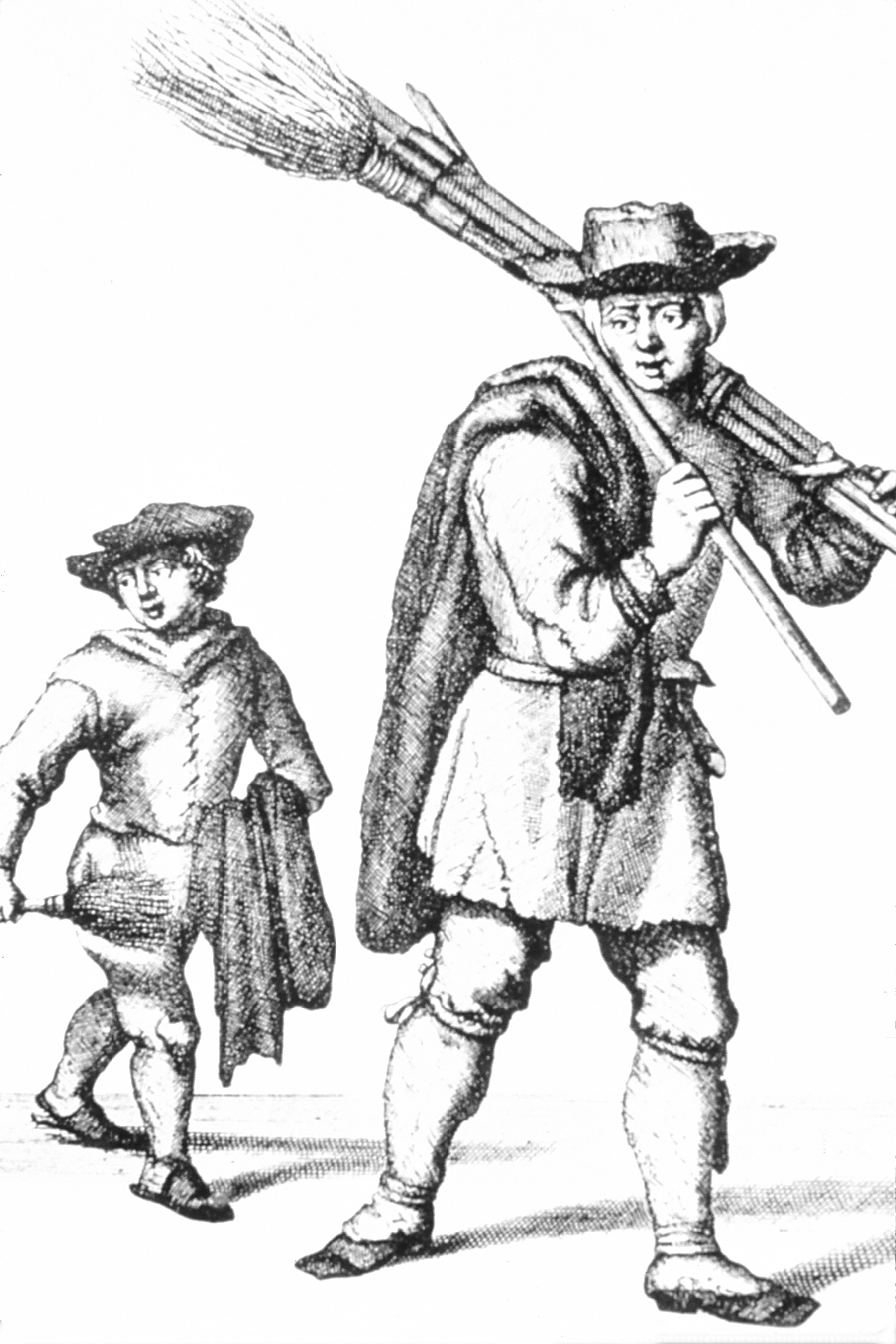
An 18th-century drawing of chimney sweeps.

Historically, PAHs contributed substantially to our understanding of adverse health effects from exposures to environmental contaminants, including chemical carcinogenesis. In 1775, Percivall Pott, a surgeon at St. Bartholomew's Hospital in London, observed that scrotal cancer was unusually common in chimney sweepers and proposed the cause as occupational exposure to soot. A century later, Richard von Volkmann reported increased skin cancers in workers of the coal tar industry of Germany, and by the early 1900s increased rates of cancer from exposure to soot and coal tar was widely accepted. In 1915, Yamigawa and Ichicawa were the first to experimentally produce cancers, specifically of the skin, by topically applying coal tar to rabbit ears.

In 1922, Ernest Kennaway determined that the carcinogenic component of coal tar mixtures was an organic compound consisting of only carbon and hydrogen. This component was later linked to a characteristic fluorescent pattern that was similar but not identical to benz[a]anthracene, a PAH that was subsequently demonstrated to cause tumors. Cook, Hewett and Hieger then linked the specific spectroscopic fluorescent profile of benzo[a]pyrene to that of the carcinogenic component of coal tar, the first time that a specific compound from an environmental mixture (coal tar) was demonstrated to be carcinogenic.

In the 1930s and later, epidemiologists from Japan, the UK, and the US, including Richard Doll and various others, reported greater rates of death from lung cancer following occupational exposure to PAH-rich environments among workers in coke ovens and coal carbonization and gasification processes.

==== Mechanisms of carcinogenesis ====
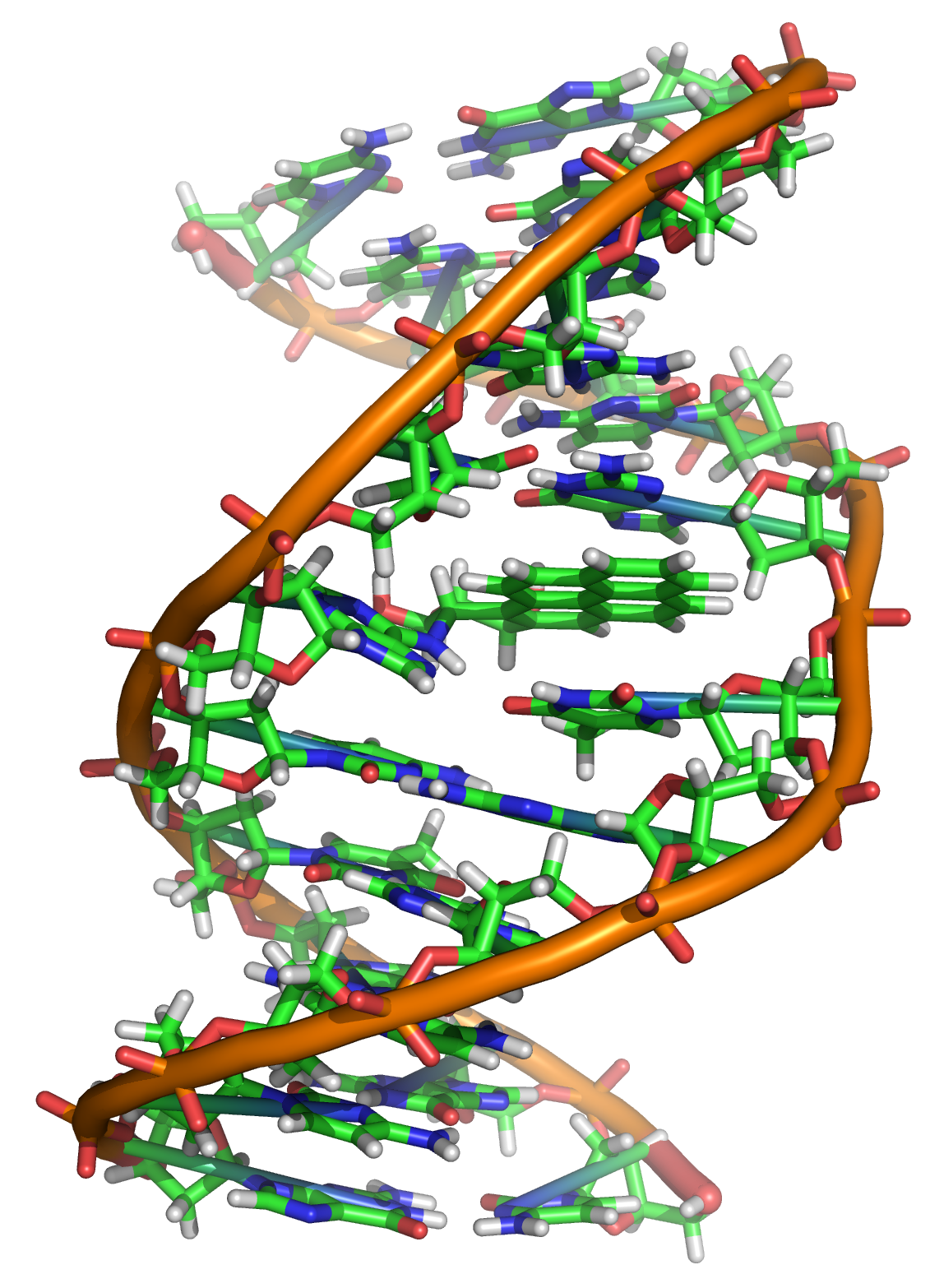
An adduct formed between a DNA strand and an epoxide derived from a benzo[a]pyrene molecule (center); such adducts may interfere with normal DNA replication.

The structure of a PAH influences whether and how the individual compound is carcinogenic. Some carcinogenic PAHs are genotoxic and induce mutations that initiate cancer; others are not genotoxic and instead affect cancer promotion or progression.

PAHs that affect cancer initiation are typically first chemically modified by enzymes into metabolites that react with DNA, leading to mutations. When the DNA sequence is altered in genes that regulate cell replication, cancer can result. Mutagenic PAHs, such as benzo[a]pyrene, usually have four or more aromatic rings as well as a "bay region", a structural pocket that increases reactivity of the molecule to the metabolizing enzymes. Mutagenic metabolites of PAHs include diol epoxides, quinones, and radical PAH cations. These metabolites can bind to DNA at specific sites, forming bulky complexes called DNA adducts that can be stable or unstable. Stable adducts may lead to DNA replication errors, while unstable adducts react with the DNA strand, removing a purine base (either adenine or guanine). Such mutations, if they are not repaired, can transform genes encoding for normal cell signaling proteins into cancer-causing oncogenes. Quinones can also repeatedly generate reactive oxygen species that may independently damage DNA.

Enzymes in the cytochrome family (CYP1A1, CYP1A2, CYP1B1) metabolize PAHs to diol epoxides. PAH exposure can increase production of the cytochrome enzymes, allowing the enzymes to convert PAHs into mutagenic diol epoxides at greater rates. In this pathway, PAH molecules bind to the aryl hydrocarbon receptor (AhR) and activate it as a transcription factor that increases production of the cytochrome enzymes. The activity of these enzymes may at times conversely protect against PAH toxicity, which is not yet well understood.

Low molecular weight PAHs, with two to four aromatic hydrocarbon rings, are more potent as co-carcinogens during the promotional stage of cancer. In this stage, an initiated cell (a cell that has retained a carcinogenic mutation in a key gene related to cell replication) is removed from growth-suppressing signals from its neighboring cells and begins to clonally replicate. Low-molecular-weight PAHs that have bay or bay-like regions can dysregulate gap junction channels, interfering with intercellular communication, and also affect mitogen-activated protein kinases that activate transcription factors involved in cell proliferation. Closure of gap junction protein channels is a normal precursor to cell division. Excessive closure of these channels after exposure to PAHs results in removing a cell from the normal growth-regulating signals imposed by its local community of cells, thus allowing initiated cancerous cells to replicate. These PAHs do not need to be enzymatically metabolized first. Low molecular weight PAHs are prevalent in the environment, thus posing a significant risk to human health at the promotional phases of cancer.

=== Cardiovascular disease ===
Adult exposure to PAHs has been linked to cardiovascular disease. PAHs are among the complex suite of contaminants in tobacco smoke and particulate air pollution and may contribute to cardiovascular disease resulting from such exposures.

In laboratory experiments, animals exposed to certain PAHs have shown increased development of plaques (atherogenesis) within arteries. Potential mechanisms for the pathogenesis and development of atherosclerotic plaques may be similar to the mechanisms involved in the carcinogenic and mutagenic properties of PAHs. A leading hypothesis is that PAHs may activate the cytochrome enzyme CYP1B1 in vascular smooth muscle cells. This enzyme then metabolically processes the PAHs to quinone metabolites that bind to DNA in reactive adducts that remove purine bases. The resulting mutations may contribute to unregulated growth of vascular smooth muscle cells or to their migration to the inside of the artery, which are steps in plaque formation. These quinone metabolites also generate reactive oxygen species that may alter the activity of genes that affect plaque formation.

Oxidative stress following PAH exposure could also result in cardiovascular disease by causing inflammation, which has been recognized as an important factor in the development of atherosclerosis and cardiovascular disease. Biomarkers of exposure to PAHs in humans have been associated with inflammatory biomarkers that are recognized as important predictors of cardiovascular disease, suggesting that oxidative stress resulting from exposure to PAHs may be a mechanism of cardiovascular disease in humans.

=== Fetal development impacts ===
Multiple epidemiological studies of people living in Europe, the United States, and China have linked in utero exposure to PAHs, through air pollution or parental occupational exposure, with poor fetal growth, reduced immune function, and poorer neurological development, including lower IQ.

== Regulation and oversight ==
Some governmental bodies, including the European Union as well as NIOSH and the United States Environmental Protection Agency (EPA), regulate concentrations of PAHs in air, water, and soil. The European Commission has restricted concentrations of 8 carcinogenic PAHs in consumer products that contact the skin or mouth.

Priority polycyclic aromatic hydrocarbons identified by the US EPA, the US Agency for Toxic Substances and Disease Registry (ATSDR), and the European Food Safety Authority (EFSA) due to their carcinogenicity or genotoxicity and/or ability to be monitored are the following:

Compound	Agency	EPA MCL in water [mg L^{−1}]
acenaphthene	EPA, ATSDR	
acenaphthylene	EPA, ATSDR	
anthracene	EPA, ATSDR	
benz[a]anthracene^{[A]}	EPA, ATSDR, EFSA	0.0001
benzo[b]fluoranthene^{[A]}	EPA, ATSDR, EFSA	0.0002
benzo[j]fluoranthene	ATSDR, EFSA	
benzo[k]fluoranthene^{[A]}	EPA, ATSDR, EFSA	0.0002
benzo[c]fluorene	EFSA	
benzo[ghi]perylene^{[A]}	EPA, ATSDR, EFSA	
benzo[a]pyrene^{[A]}	EPA, ATSDR, EFSA	0.0002
benzo[e]pyrene	ATSDR	
chrysene^{[A]}	EPA, ATSDR, EFSA	0.0002
coronene	ATSDR	

Compound	Agency	EPA MCL in water [mg L^{−1}]
cyclopenta[cd]pyrene	EFSA	
dibenz[a,h]anthracene^{[A]}	EPA, ATSDR, EFSA	0.0003
dibenzo[a,e]pyrene	EFSA	
dibenzo[a,h]pyrene	EFSA	
dibenzo[a,i]pyrene	EFSA	
dibenzo[a,l]pyrene	EFSA	
fluoranthene	EPA, ATSDR	
fluorene	EPA, ATSDR	
indeno[1,2,3-cd]pyrene^{[A]}	EPA, ATSDR, EFSA	0.0004
5-methylchrysene	EFSA	
naphthalene	EPA	
phenanthrene	EPA, ATSDR	
pyrene	EPA, ATSDR	

^{A} Considered probable or possible human carcinogens by the US EPA, the European Union, and/or the International Agency for Research on Cancer (IARC).

== Detection and optical properties ==
A spectral database exists for tracking polycyclic aromatic hydrocarbons (PAHs) in the universe. Detection of PAHs in materials is often done using gas chromatography-mass spectrometry or liquid chromatography with ultraviolet-visible or fluorescence spectroscopic methods or by using rapid test PAH indicator strips. Structures of PAHs have been analyzed using infrared spectroscopy.

PAHs possess very characteristic UV absorbance spectra. These often possess many absorbance bands and are unique for each ring structure. Thus, for a set of isomers, each isomer has a different UV absorbance spectrum than the others. This is particularly useful in the identification of PAHs. Most PAHs are also fluorescent, emitting characteristic wavelengths of light when they are excited (when the molecules absorb light). The extended pi-electron electronic structures of PAHs lead to these spectra, as well as to certain large PAHs also exhibiting semi-conducting and other behaviors.

=== Origins of life ===
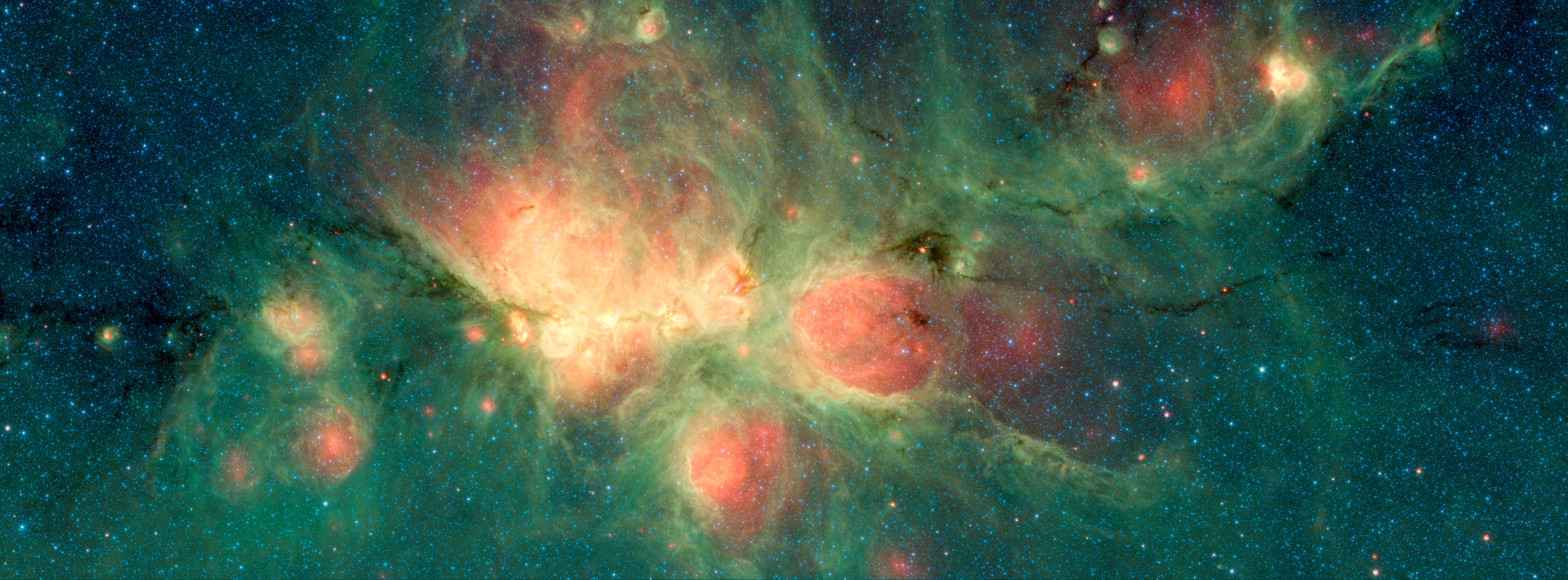
The Cat's Paw Nebula lies inside the Milky Way Galaxy and is located in the constellation Scorpius. Green areas show regions where radiation from hot stars collided with large molecules and small dust grains called "polycyclic aromatic hydrocarbons" (PAHs), causing them to fluoresce. (Spitzer Space Telescope, 2018)

PAHs may be abundant in the universe. They seem to have been formed as early as a couple of billion years after the Big Bang, and are associated with new stars and exoplanets. More than 20% of the carbon in the universe may be associated with PAHs. PAHs are considered possible starting material for the earliest forms of life. Light emitted by the Red Rectangle Nebula possesses spectral signatures that suggest the presence of anthracene and pyrene. This report was considered a controversial hypothesis that as nebulae of the same type as the Red Rectangle approach the ends of their lives, convection currents cause carbon and hydrogen in the nebulae's cores to get caught in stellar winds, and radiate outward. As they cool, the atoms supposedly bond to each other in various ways and eventually form particles of a million or more atoms. Adolf Witt and his team inferred that PAHs—which may have been vital in the formation of early life on Earth—can only originate in nebulae.

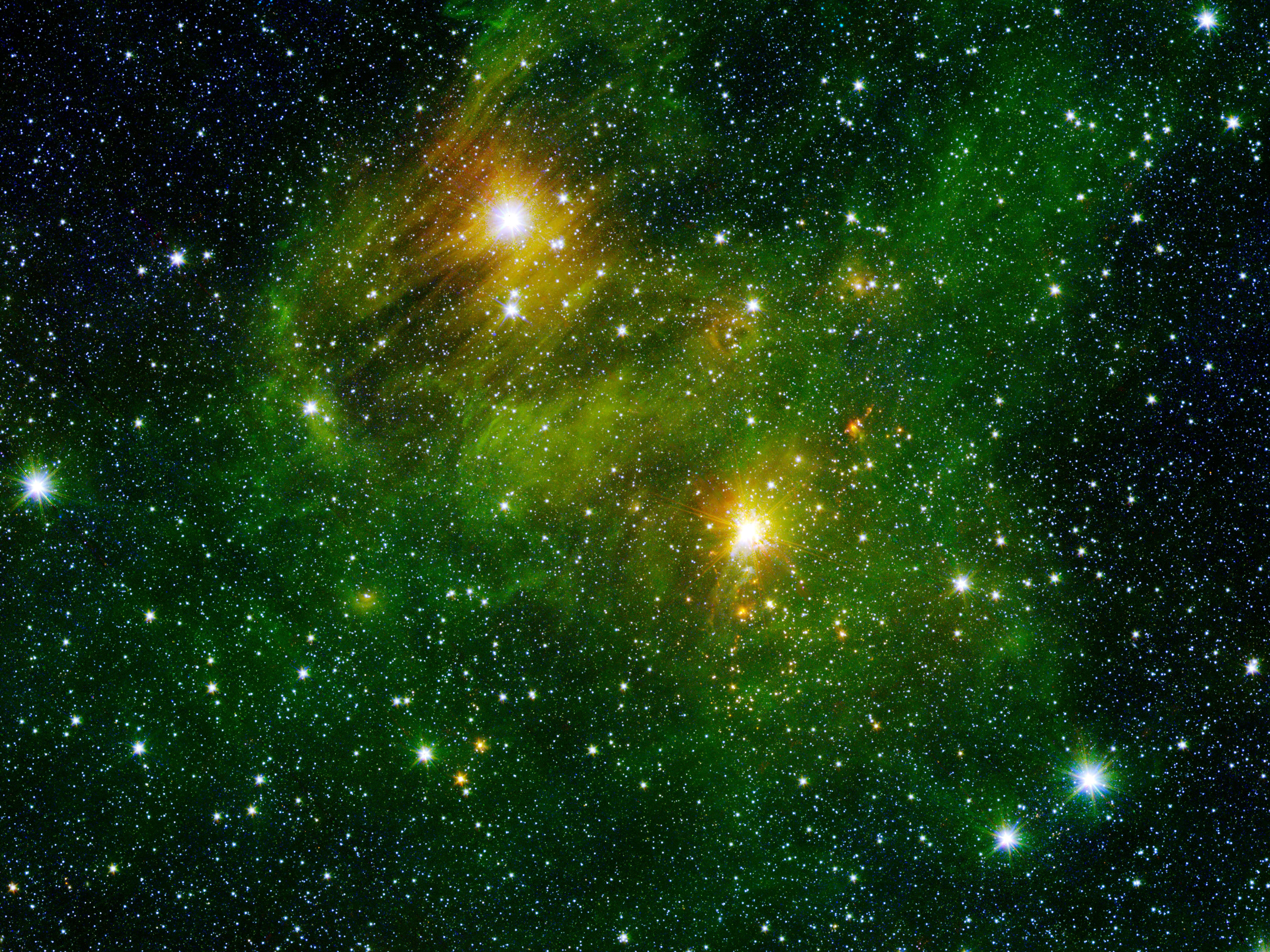
Two extremely bright stars illuminate a mist of PAHs in this Spitzer Space Telescope image.

PAHs, subjected to interstellar medium (ISM) conditions, are transformed, through hydrogenation, oxygenation, and hydroxylation, to more complex organic compounds—"a step along the path toward amino acids and nucleotides, the raw materials of proteins and DNA, respectively". Further, as a result of these transformations, the PAHs lose their spectroscopic signature which could be one of the reasons "for the lack of PAH detection in interstellar ice grains, particularly the outer regions of cold, dense clouds or the upper molecular layers of protoplanetary disks."

Low-temperature chemical pathways from simple organic compounds to complex PAHs are of interest. Such chemical pathways may help explain the presence of PAHs in the low-temperature atmosphere of Saturn's moon Titan, and may be significant pathways, in terms of the PAH world hypothesis, in producing precursors to biochemicals related to life as we know it.

== See also ==
- Chicken wire (chemistry)
- F number
- Graphene
- Naphthalene
- Total petroleum hydrocarbon
