= Hexabenzocoronene =

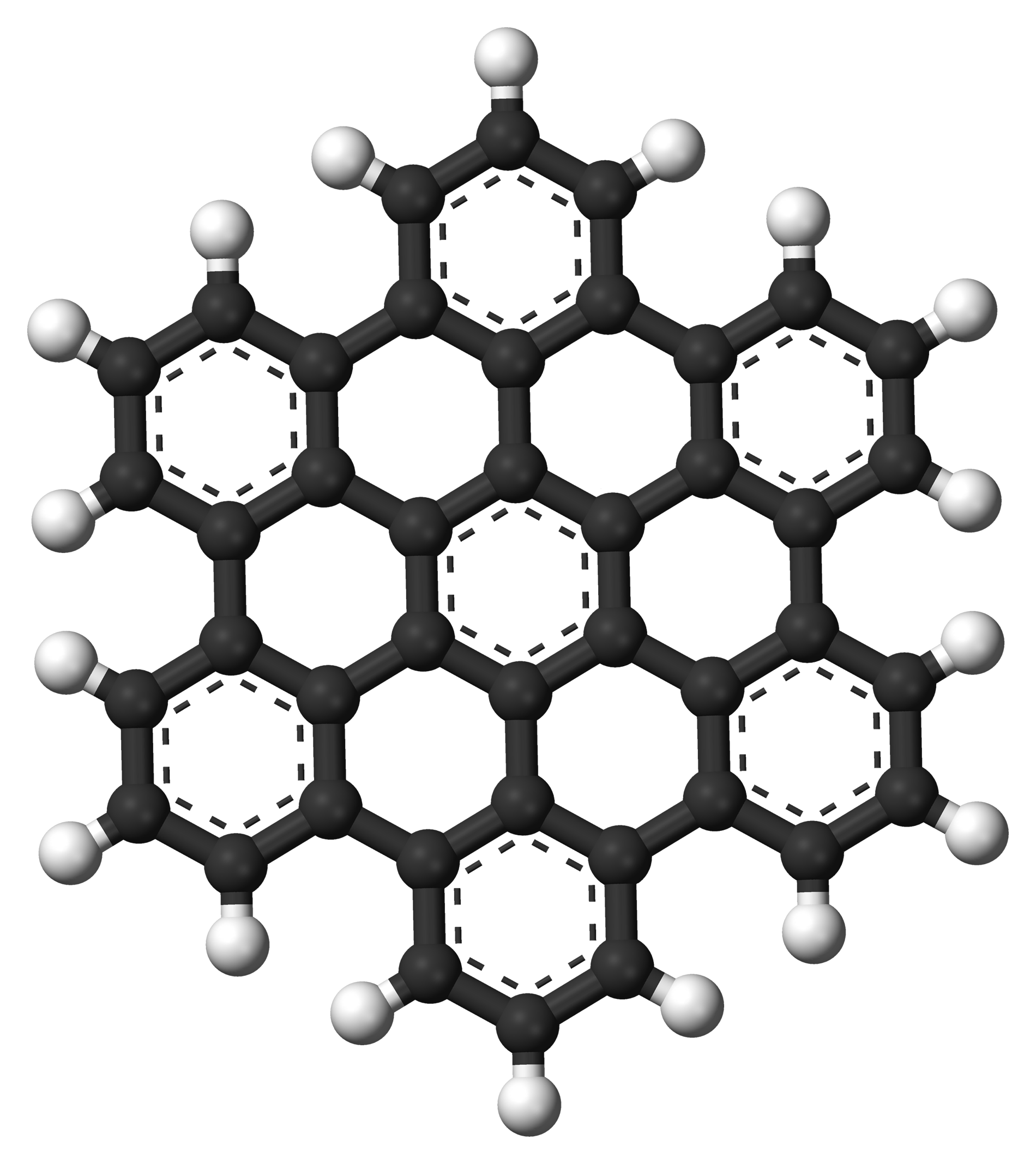

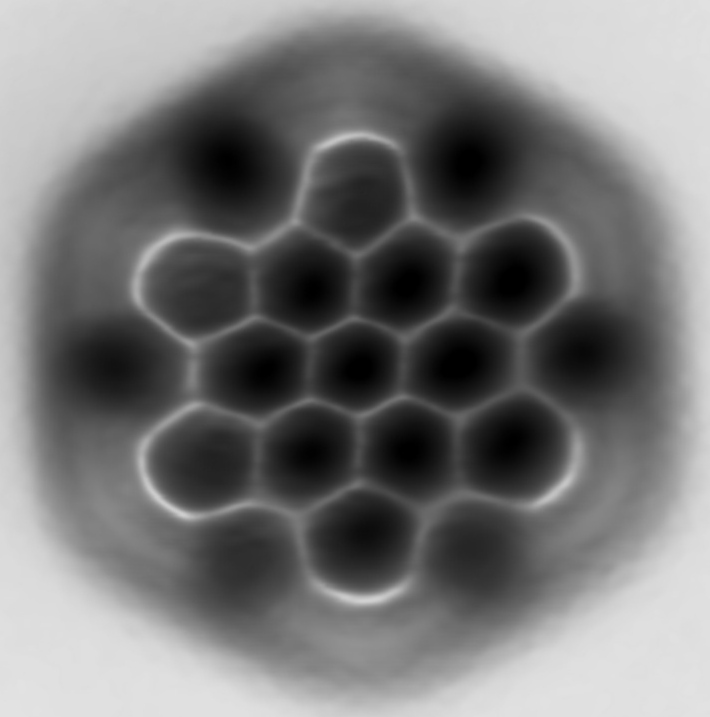
- AFM image of hexabenzocoronene

Names
- Preferred IUPAC name Hexabenzo[bc,ef,hi,kl,no,qr]coronene
- Other names: Hexa-peri-hexabenzocoronene; Hexabenzocoronene

Identifiers
CAS Number	190-24-9
3D model (JSmol)	Interactive image
ChemSpider	119779
PubChem CID	136001
UNII	8TZ95D8GP4
CompTox Dashboard (EPA)	DTXSID30172446
- InChI: InChI=1S/C42H20/c1-7-19-21-9-2-11-23-25-13-4-15-27-29-17-6-18-30-28-16-5-14-26-24-12-3-10-22-20(8-1)31(19)37-38(32(21)23)40(34(25)27)42(36(29)30)41(35(26)28)39(37)33(22)24/h1-17,35H,18H2 Key: FYXBXZBCUROVBE-UHFFFAOYSA-N
- SMILES: c0cc1c2c3c4c5c1cccc5c6cccc1c6c4c7c8c1cccc8c9cccc1c9c7c3c5c1cccc5c2c0

Properties
Chemical formula	C_{42}H_{18}
Molar mass	522.606 g·mol^{−1}
Appearance	dark yellow
Density	1.54 g/cm^{3} (calc.)
Magnetic susceptibility (χ)	−346.0·10^{−6} cm^{3}/mol

Structure
Space group	monoclinic, P2_{1}/a
Lattice constant	a = 1.8431(3) nm, b = 0.5119(1) nm, c = 1.2929(2) nm α = 90°, β = 112.57(1)°, γ = 90°
Formula units (Z)	2
- Except where otherwise noted, data are given for materials in their standard state (at 25 °C [77 °F], 100 kPa). Infobox references

Hexa-peri-hexabenzocoronene (HBC) is a polycyclic aromatic hydrocarbon with the molecular formula C_{42}H_{18}. It consists of a central coronene molecule, with an additional benzene ring fused between each adjacent pair of rings around the periphery. It is sometimes simply called hexabenzocoronene, however, there are other chemicals that share this less-specific name, such as hexa-cata-hexabenzocoronene.

Hexa-peri-hexabenzocoronene has been imaged by atomic force microscopy (AFM) providing the first example of a molecule in which differences in bond order and bond lengths of the individual bonds can be distinguished by a measurement in direct space.

== Supramolecular structures ==
Various hexabenzocoronenes have been investigated in supramolecular electronics. They are known to self-assemble into a columnar phase. One derivative in particular forms carbon nanotubes with interesting electrical properties. The columnar phase in this compound further organises itself into sheets, which ultimately roll up like a carpet to form multi-walled nanotubes with an outer diameter of 20 nanometers and a wall thickness of 3 nm. In this geometry, the stacks of coronene disks are aligned with the length of the tube. The nanotubes have sufficient length to fit between two platinum nanogap electrodes produced by scanning probe nanofabrication and are 180 nm apart. The nanotubes as such are insulating, but, after one-electron oxidation with nitrosonium tetrafluoroborate (NOBF_{4}), they conduct electricity.

=== Synthesis ===
Organic synthesis of a hexabenzocoronene starts with an Aldol condensation reaction of dibenzyl ketone with a benzil derivative to give a substituted cyclopentadienone. A Diels–Alder reaction with alkyne and subsequent expulsion of carbon monoxide gives a hexaphenylbenzene. The adjacent pairs of benzene rings undergo oxidative electrocyclic reactions and aromatization by oxidation by iron(III) chloride in nitromethane.
