= F150 (disambiguation) =

The Ford F-150 is a pickup truck produced by Ford.

F150 may also refer to:

- Ferrari 150º Italia (a.k.a. Ferrari F150) 2011 Formula 1 racecar
- LaFerrari (model F150) 2013-2018 sports car
- "F-150", a 2020 song by Robyn Ottolini
- Reims F150, license production variation of the Cessna 150 light airplane
- Farman F.150, twin-engined biplane bomber warplane
- HMAS Anzac (F150), lead ship of the Royal Australian Navy Anzac-class frigate warship
- SAS President Kruger (F150), South African Navy frigate warship
