= F-ratio =

F-ratio or f-ratio may refer to:

- The F-ratio used in statistics, which relates the variances of independent samples; see F-distribution
- f-ratio (oceanography), which relates recycled and total primary production in the surface ocean
- f-number, f-ratio, or focal ratio, the ratio of the focal length of an optical system to the diameter of its entrance pupil

== See also ==
- F-number (disambiguation)
