= Hexa-cata-hexabenzocoronene =

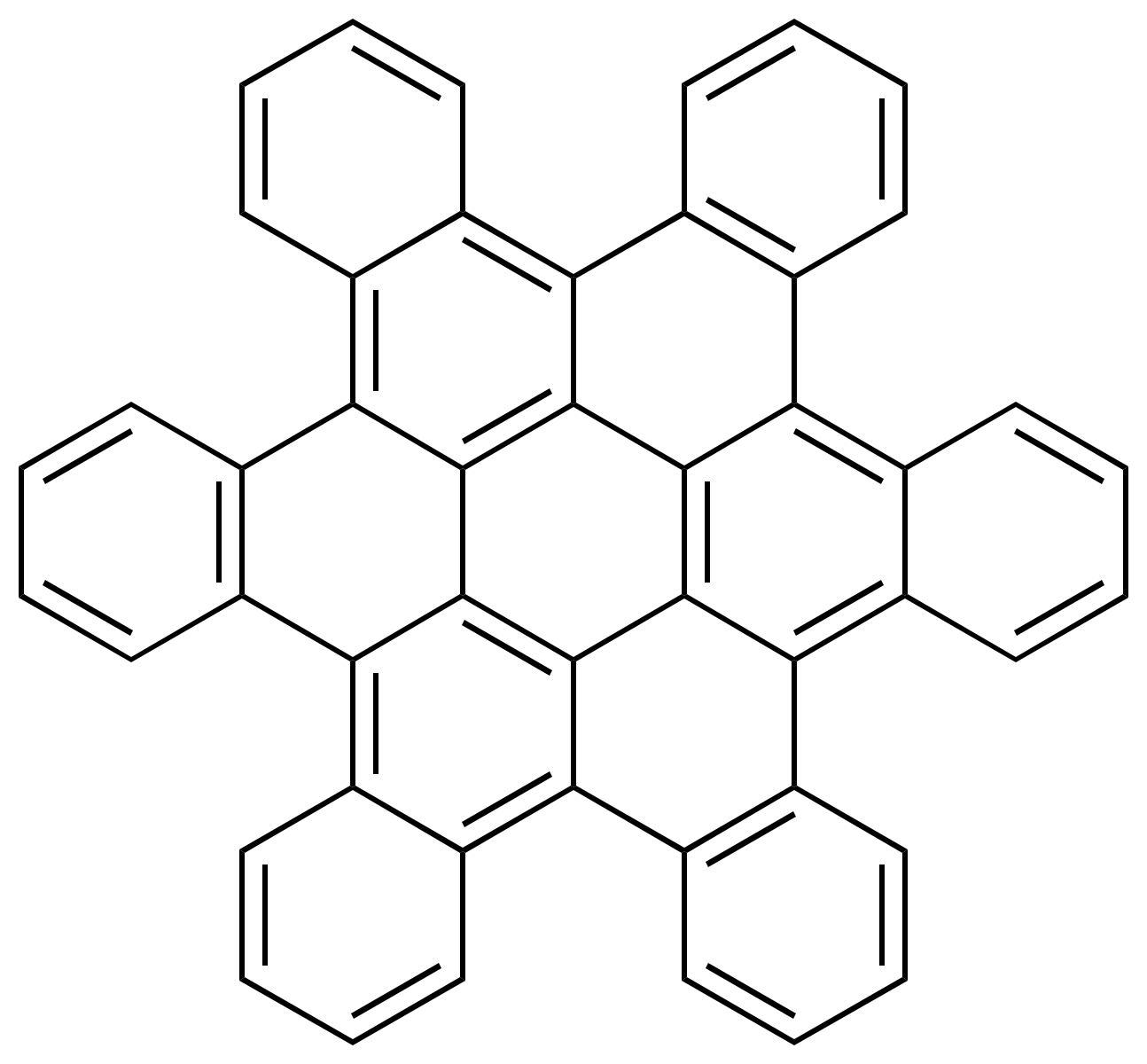

Names
- Preferred IUPAC name Trinaphtho[1,2,3,4-fgh:1′,2′,3′,4′-pqr:1′′,2′′,3′′,4′′-za_{1}b_{1}]trinaphthylene
- Other names Hexabenzo[a,d,g,j,m,p]coronene

Identifiers
CAS Number	1065-80-1
3D model (JSmol)	Interactive image
ChemSpider	59495
ECHA InfoCard	100.012.641
PubChem CID	66107
UNII	7M3LAB7SKL
CompTox Dashboard (EPA)	DTXSID50147616
- InChI: InChI=1S/C48H24/c1-2-14-26-25(13-1)37-27-15-3-4-16-28(27)39-31-19-7-8-20-32(31)41-34-22-10-12-24-36(34)42-35-23-11-9-21-33(35)40-30-18-6-5-17-29(30)38(26)44-43(37)45(39)47(41)48(42)46(40)44/h1-24H Key: XHJPOZDMDBETDO-UHFFFAOYSA-N
- SMILES: C1=CC=C2C(=C1)C3=C4C5=C2C6=CC=CC=C6C7=C5C8=C(C9=CC=CC=C97)C1=CC=CC=C1C1=C8C4=C(C2=CC=CC=C23)C2=CC=CC=C21

Properties
Chemical formula	C_{48}H_{24}
Molar mass	600.720 g·mol^{−1}
Appearance	Yellow–orange solid
- Except where otherwise noted, data are given for materials in their standard state (at 25 °C [77 °F], 100 kPa). Infobox references

Hexa-cata-hexabenzocoronene (hexabenzo[a,d,g,j,m,p]coronene) is a polycyclic aromatic hydrocarbon with the molecular formula C_{48}H_{24}. It consists of a central coronene molecule, with an additional benzene ring fused onto each ring around the periphery.

Hexa-cata-hexabenzocoronene has a contorted structure due to steric crowding among the benzene rings around the edge, analogous to the situation in benzo[c]phenanthrene.

== See also ==
- Hexabenzocoronene
