= Circulene =

Class of chemical

[7]circulene

A circulene is a macrocyclic arene in which a central polygon is surrounded and fused by benzenoids. Nomenclature within this class of molecules is based on the number of benzene rings surrounding the core, which is equivalent to the size of the central polygon. Examples which have been synthesized include [5]circulene (corannulene), [6]circulene (coronene), [7]circulene, and [12]circulene (kekulene) These compounds belong to a larger class of geodesic polyarenes. Whereas [5]circulene is bowl-shaped and [6]circulene is planar, [7]circulene has a unique saddle-shaped structure (compare to cones and partial cones in calixarenes). The helicenes are a conceptually related class of structures in which the array of benzene rings form an open helix rather than a closed ring.

== Quadrannulene ([4]circulene) ==
The simple [4]circulene compound itself has not been synthesized, but a derivative, tetrabenzo[4]circulene, also called quadrannulene, has.

== [8]Circulenes ==
The isolation of the [8]circulene derivative 2,5,6,9,10,13,14-octamethyl-3,4,7,8,11,12,15,16-octa(4-tolyl)[8]circulene has been reported. Tetrabenzo[8]circulene (TB8C), a functionally stable form of the parent molecule [8]circulene has also been reported.

== Heterocyclic circulenes ==
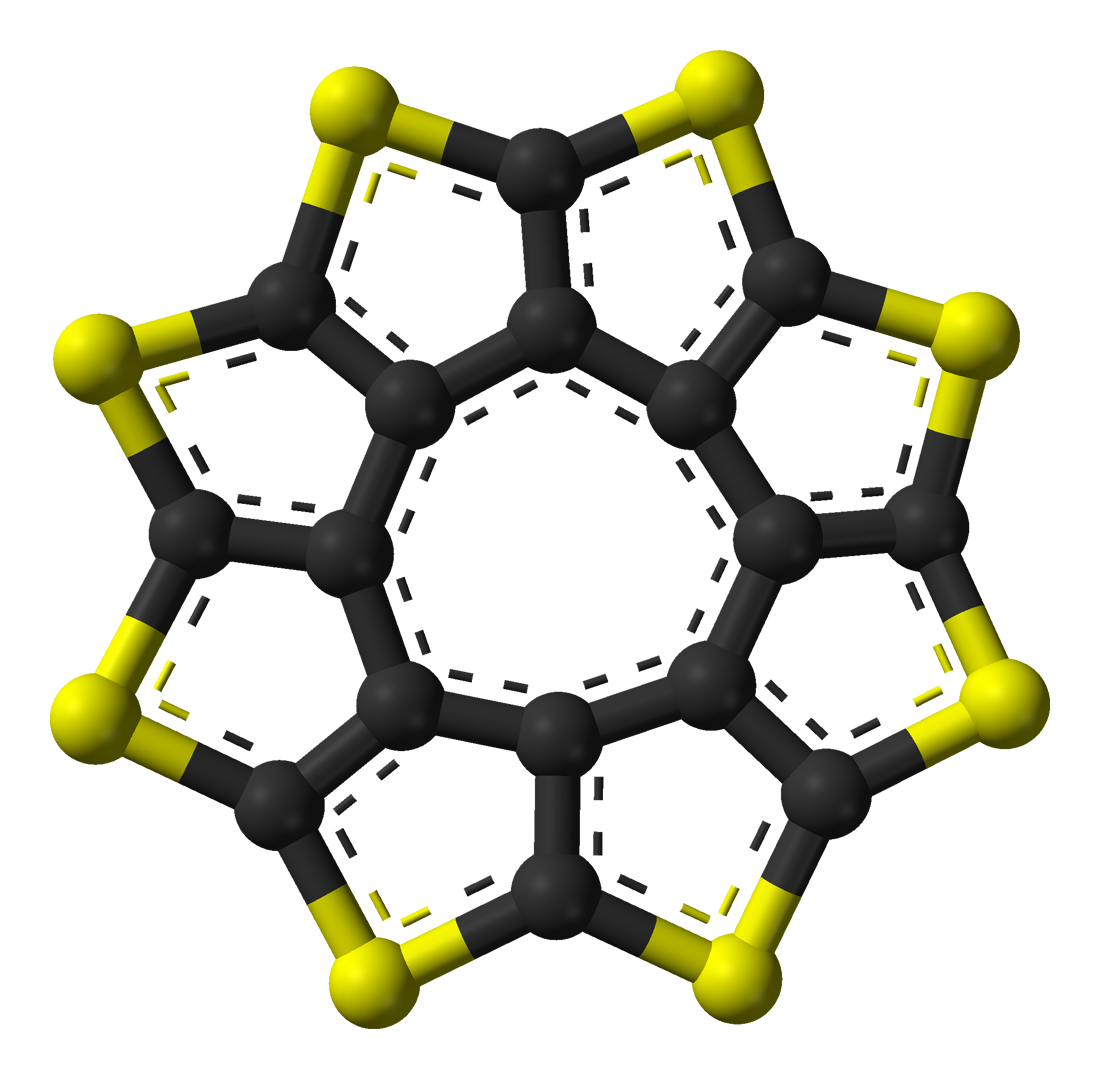
Sulflower, an octacirculene

A heterocyclic circulene is one in which the fused rings around the periphery are not simple hydrocarbons, but instead contain at least one other element. Sulflower is a stable heterocyclic octacirculene based on thiophene.

== Gallery ==
Corannulene ([5]circulene)

Coronene ([6]circulene)

[7]circulene

Kekulene ([12]circulene)
