= F number (chemistry) =

F number is a correlation number used in the analysis of polycyclic aromatic hydrocarbons (PAHs) as a descriptor of their hydrophobicity and molecular size. It was proposed by Robert Hurtubise and co-workers in 1977.

== Calculation ==
The F number is calculated using the formula:

$$F = B_2 + C_{12} - \frac{1}{2}R$$

where:

B_{2} is the number of double bonds
C_{12} is the number of primary carbon and secondary carbon atoms
R is the number of non-aromatic rings.

=== Example ===
Fluorene

For fluorene, there are 6 apparent double bonds (three pi bonds in each side benzene-like ring); the central ring has one secondary carbon and is non-aromatic. Therefore:

$$F = 6 + 1 - \frac{1}{2}1 = 6.5$$

== Correlation ==
It has been found that the F number linearly correlates with the log k' value (logarithm of the retention factor) in aqueous reversed-phase liquid chromatography. This relationship can be used to understand the significance of different aspects of molecular architecture on their separation using different stationary phases. This size analysis is complementary to the length-to-breadth (L/B) ratio, which classifies molecules according to their "rodlike" or "squarelike" shape.
