= Kekulene =

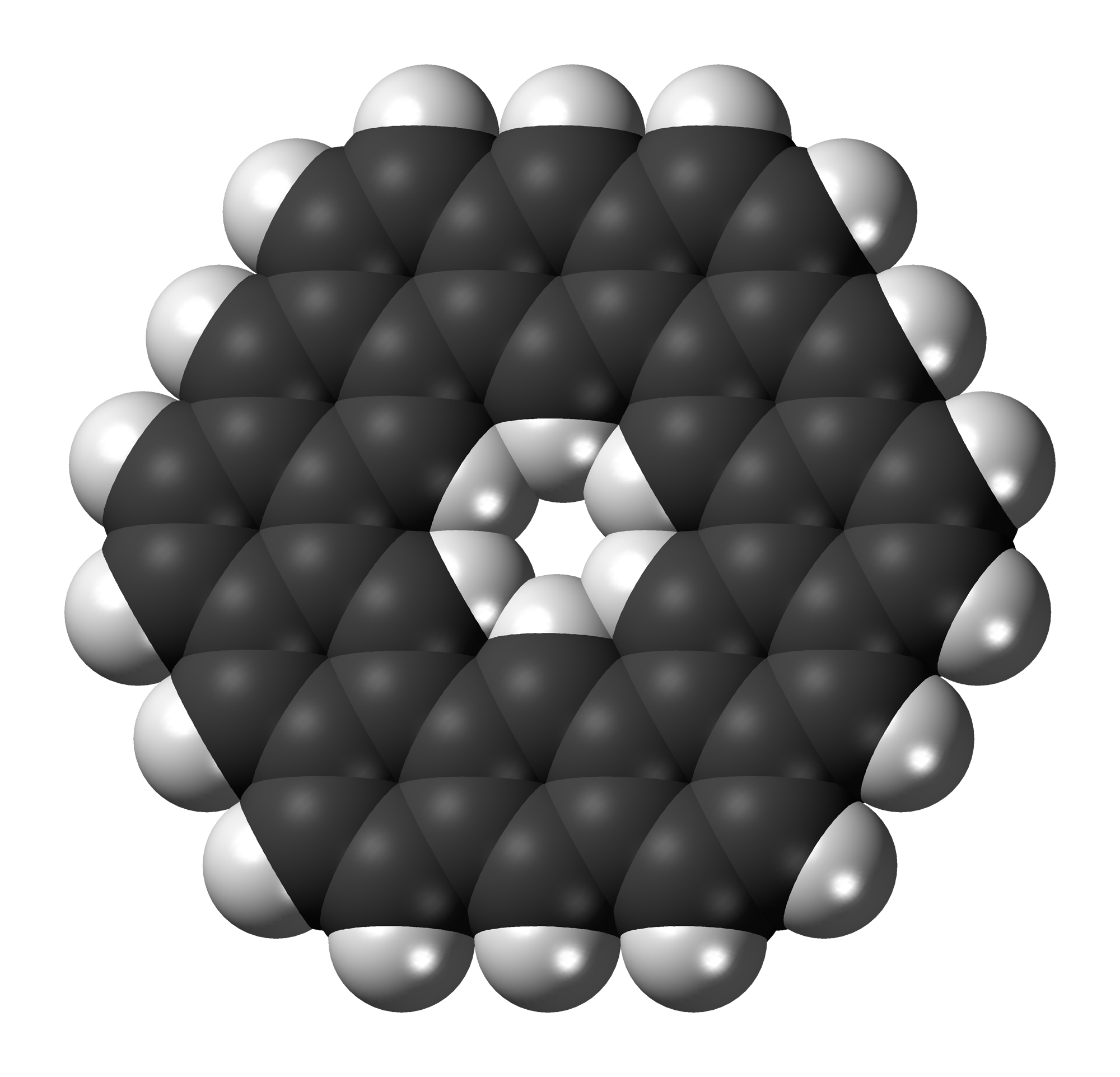

Names
- Preferred IUPAC name 15,23:16,22-Di(metheno)naphtho[2,3-a]tetrapheno[3,2-o]pentaphene
- Other names [12]–Coronaphen, [12]Circulene

Identifiers
CAS Number	15123-47-4
3D model (JSmol)	Interactive image
ChEBI	CHEBI:32987
ChemSpider	4574217
PubChem CID	5460755
UNII	ZJP7XZW8ZD
CompTox Dashboard (EPA)	DTXSID10420119
- InChI: InChI=1S/C48H24/c1-2-26-14-28-5-6-30-16-32-9-10-34-18-36-12-11-35-17-33-8-7-31-15-29-4-3-27-13-25(1)37-19-39(27)41(29)21-43(31)45(33)23-47(35)48(36)24-46(34)44(32)22-42(30)40(28)20-38(26)37/h1-24H Key: TYPKKLUFDMGLAC-UHFFFAOYSA-N; InChI=1/C48H24/c1-2-26-14-28-5-6-30-16-32-9-10-34-18-36-12-11-35-17-33-8-7-31-15-29-4-3-27-13-25(1)37-19-39(27)41(29)21-43(31)45(33)23-47(35)48(36)24-46(34)44(32)22-42(30)40(28)20-38(26)37/h1-24H Key: TYPKKLUFDMGLAC-UHFFFAOYAP
- SMILES: C1=CC2=CC3=C4C=C2C5=CC6=C(C=CC7=CC8=C(C=C76)C9=CC2=C(C=CC6=C2C=C2C(=C6)C=CC6=C2C=C4C(=C6)C=C3)C=C9C=C8)C=C51

Properties
Chemical formula	C_{48}H_{24}
Molar mass	600.720 g·mol^{−1}
Density	1.46 g/cm^{3} (calc.)

Structure
Space group	monoclinic, C2/c
Lattice constant	a = 2795.1(4) pm, b = 457.9(1) pm, c = 2268.0(2) pm α = 90°, β = 109.64(1)°, γ = 90°
Formula units (Z)	4
- Except where otherwise noted, data are given for materials in their standard state (at 25 °C [77 °F], 100 kPa). verify (what is ?) Infobox references

Kekulene is a polycyclic aromatic hydrocarbon which consists of 12 fused benzene rings arranged in a circle. It is therefore classified as a [12]-circulene with the chemical formula C_{48}H_{24}. It was first synthesized in 1978, and was named in honor of August Kekulé, the discoverer of the structure of the benzene molecule.

== Geometry and electronic structure ==
The nature of the π bonding within the molecule was long debated, as several distinctly different arrangements were possible. The two most significant proposals are the "Clar" configuration, consisting of six benzene-like (aromatic 6 π-electron) rings connected by bridging bonds and vinyl groups in non-aromatic rings, and the "Kekulé" configuration, consisting of two concentric aromatic rings (18 π-electron inner, 30 π-electron outer) linked by radial single bonds.

Proposed electronic configurations

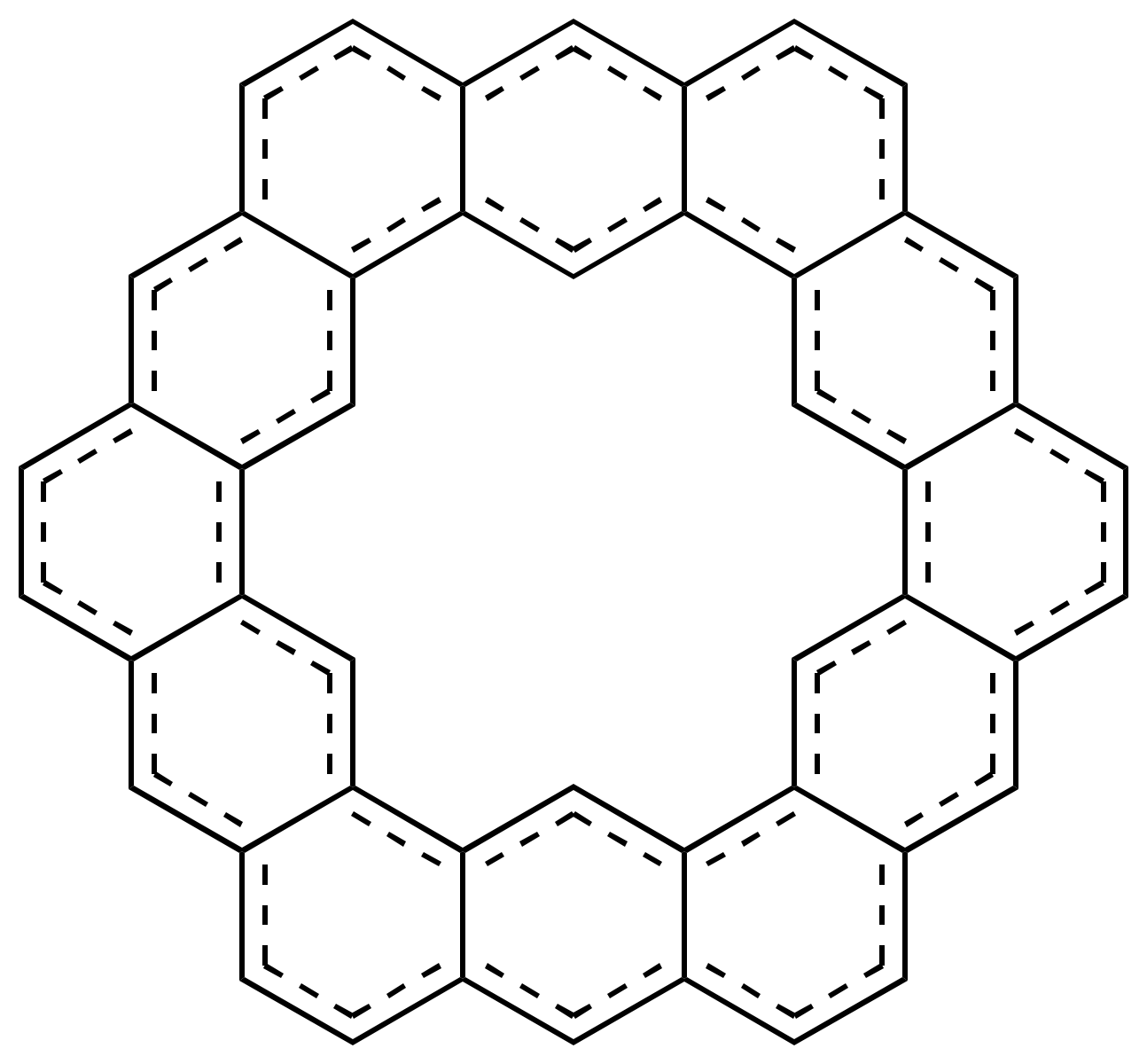
"Kekulé" configuration: Two concentric aromatic rings

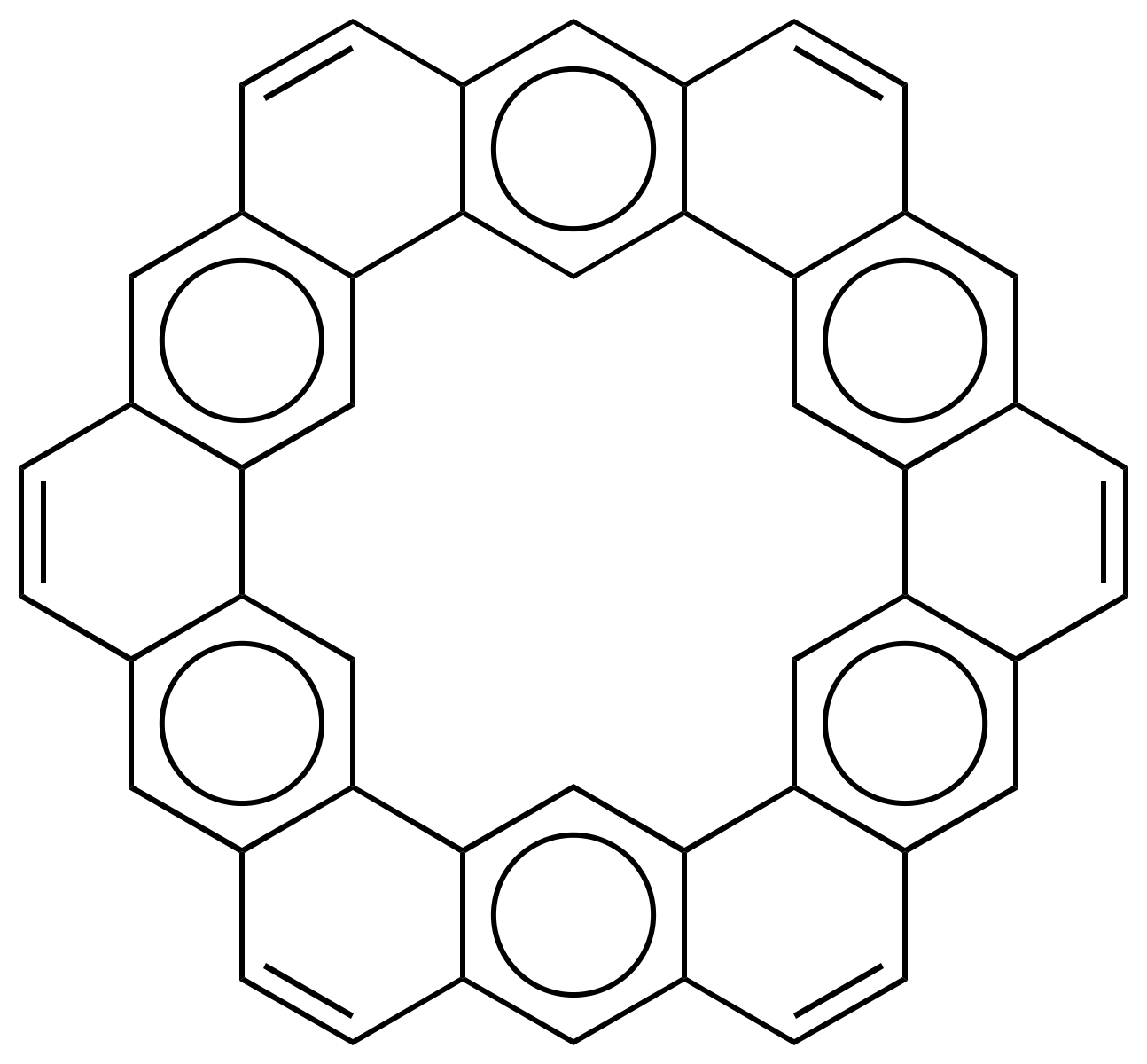
"Clar" configuration: Benzene rings alternating with non-aromatic linkers

The synthesis of the compound, first reported in 1978, allowed experimental determination of the electronic structure. In the late 1970s, ^{1}H-NMR provided evidence of benzene rings and X-ray analysis determined that the structure had had alternating aromatic and non-aromatic rings, both consistent with the Clar configuration. In 2019, the configuration was determined to be one consisting of benzene-like rings alternating with non-aromatic linkages, by using single molecule atomic force microscopy to measure the carbon–carbon bond-lengths and bond orders. This configuration is in keeping with Clar's rule, as it has the largest number of disjoint aromatic π sextets.

Though the whole structure is essentially planar, it only has three-fold symmetry rather than six-fold. The carbon–hydrogen bonds in the center of the ring have a slight alternating tilt out of the plane to avoid steric hindrance among the hydrogen atoms.
