= Coronene =

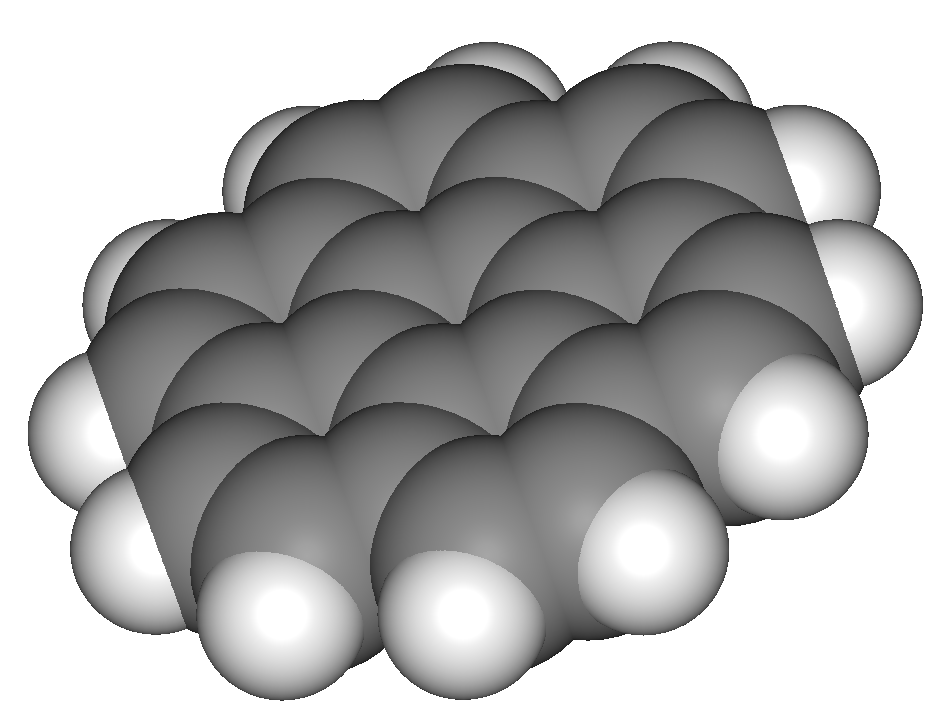

Names
- Preferred IUPAC name Coronene
- Other names [6]circulene X1001757-9, superbenzene, cyclobenzene

Identifiers
CAS Number	191-07-1
3D model (JSmol)	Interactive image
Beilstein Reference	658468
ChEBI	CHEBI:29863
ChemSpider	8761
ECHA InfoCard	100.005.348
EC Number	205-881-7
Gmelin Reference	286459
KEGG	C19375
PubChem CID	9115
UNII	7YY0X5XT1W
CompTox Dashboard (EPA)	DTXSID5047740
- InChI: InChI=1S/C24H12/c1-2-14-5-6-16-9-11-18-12-10-17-8-7-15-4-3-13(1)19-20(14)22(16)24(18)23(17)21(15)19/h1-12H Key: VPUGDVKSAQVFFS-UHFFFAOYSA-N; InChI=1/C24H12/c1-2-14-5-6-16-9-11-18-12-10-17-8-7-15-4-3-13(1)19-20(14)22(16)24(18)23(17)21(15)19/h1-12H Key: VPUGDVKSAQVFFS-UHFFFAOYAQ
- SMILES: c1cc2ccc3ccc4ccc5ccc6ccc1c7c2c3c4c5c67

Properties
Chemical formula	C_{24}H_{12}
Molar mass	300.360 g·mol^{−1}
Appearance	Yellow powder
Density	1.371 g/cm^{3}
Melting point	437.3 °C (819.1 °F; 710.5 K)
Boiling point	525 °C (977 °F; 798 K)
Solubility in water	0.14 μg/L
Solubility	Very soluble: benzene, toluene, hexane, Chloroform (1 mmol L^{−1}) and ethers, sparingly soluble in ethanol.
log P	7.38
Band gap	1.7 eV
Magnetic susceptibility (χ)	−243.3×10^{−6} cm^{3}/mol

Structure
Crystal structure	Monoclinic
Space group	P2_{1}/n
Point group	D_{6h}
Lattice constant	a = 10.02 Å, b = 4.67 Å, c = 15.60 Å α = 90°, β = 106.7°, γ = 90°
Formula units (Z)	2
Dipole moment	0 D

Thermochemistry
Enthalpy of fusion (Δ_{f}H^{⦵}_{fus})	19.2 kJ/mol

Hazards
- GHS labelling
Pictograms	(GHS08: Health hazard)
Signal word	Warning
Hazard statements	H371
Precautionary statements	P260, P264, P270, P309+P311, P405, P501
NFPA 704 (fire diamond)	2 1 0
- Except where otherwise noted, data are given for materials in their standard state (at 25 °C [77 °F], 100 kPa). verify (what is ?) Infobox references

Coronene (also known as superbenzene and cyclobenzene) is a polycyclic aromatic hydrocarbon (PAH) comprising seven peri-fused benzene rings. Its chemical formula is C_{24}H_{12}. It is a yellow material that dissolves in common solvents including benzene, toluene, and dichloromethane. Its solutions emit blue light fluorescence under UV light. It has been used as a solvent probe, similar to pyrene.

The compound is of theoretical interest to organic chemists because of its aromaticity. It can be described by 20 resonance structures or by a set of three mobile Clar sextets. In the Clar sextet case, the most stable structure for coronene has only three isolated outer sextets as fully aromatic although superaromaticity would still be possible when these sextets are able to migrate into next ring.

== Occurrence and synthesis ==
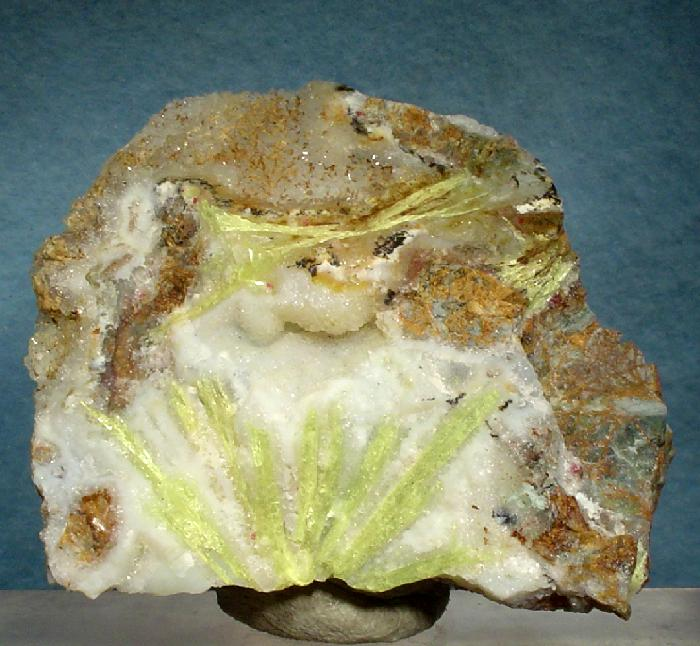
Carpathite

Coronene occurs naturally as the very rare mineral carpathite, characterized by flakes of pure coronene embedded in sedimentary rock. This mineral may be created from ancient hydrothermal vent activity. In earlier times this mineral was also called karpatite or pendletonite.

The presence of coronene putatively formed from contact of magma with fossil fuel deposits has been used to argue that Permian-Triassic "Great Dying" event was caused by a greenhouse gas warming episode triggered by large-scale Siberian vulcanism.

Coronene is produced in the petroleum-refining process of hydrocracking, where it can dimerize to a fifteen ring PAH, trivially named "dicoronylene". Centimeter-long crystals can be grown from a supersaturated solution of molecules in toluene (~2.5 mg/ml), which is slowly cooled (~0.04 K/min) from 328 K (55 °C) to 298 K (25 °C) over a period of 12 hours.

== Structure ==
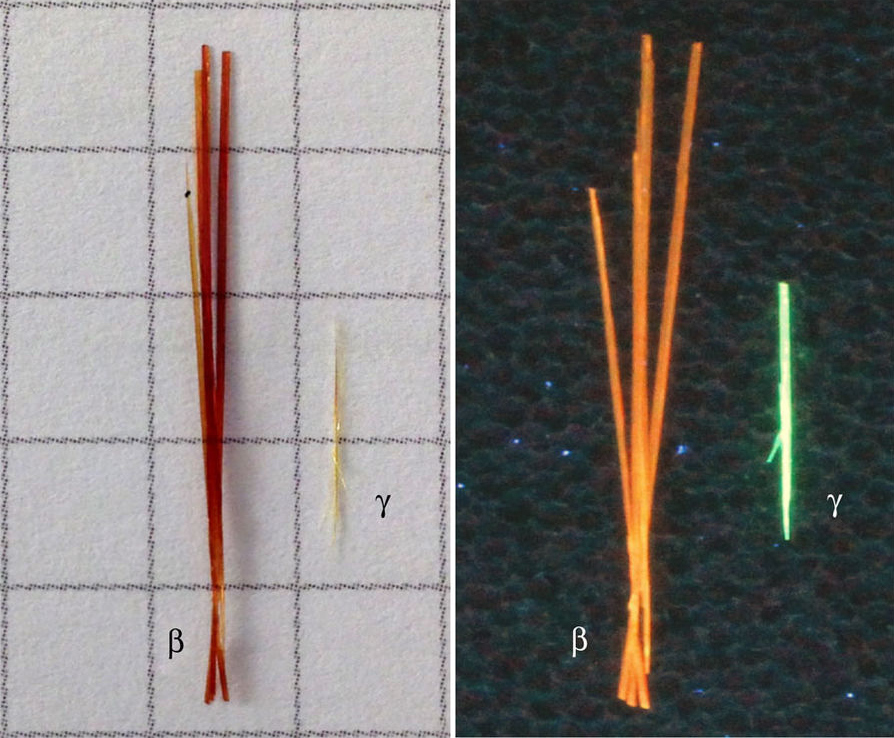
Crystals of β- and γ-coronene under daylight (left) and UV light (right)

Coronene is a planar circulene. It forms needle-like crystals with a monoclinic, herringbone-like structure. The most common polymorph is γ, but β form can also be produced in an applied magnetic field (~1 tesla) or by phase transition from γ decreasing the temperature below 158 K (−115 °C). The structure containing two C–H groups adjacent to each other on one benzene ring, so-called DUO, can be analyzed by infrared spectroscopy due to the out-of-plane bending vibration of C-H.

== Other uses ==
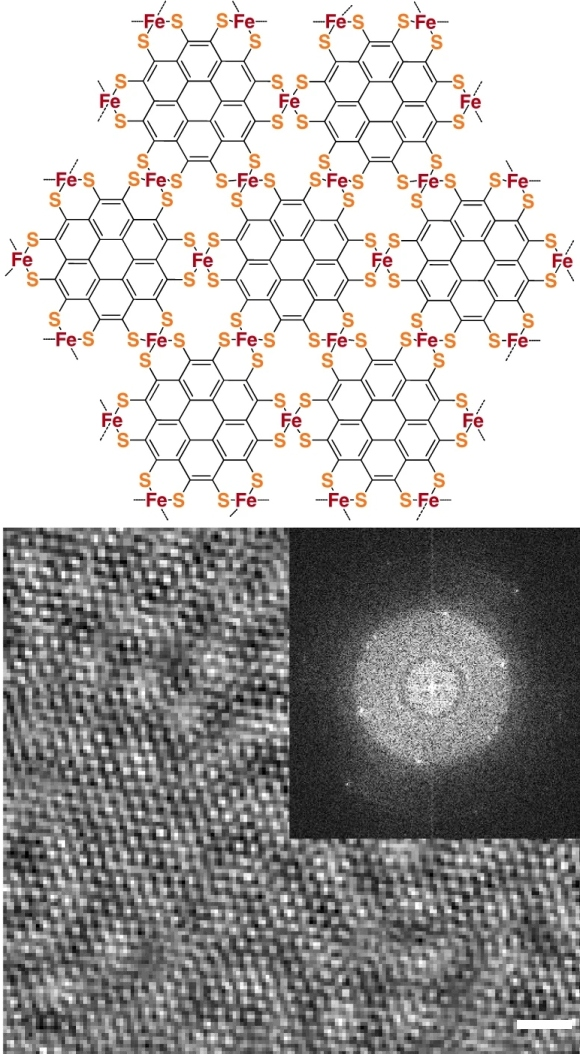
Structure and electron micrograph of a coronene-based metal–organic framework

Coronene has been used in the synthesis of graphene. For example, coronene molecules evaporated onto a copper surface at 1000 degrees Celsius will form a graphene lattice which can then be transferred onto another substrate. Coronene can also be carbonized without metal catalysts such as copper to form carbon materials with SOLO, which includes one C-H group in one benzene ring. Since coronene is symmetrical, carbon materials with controlled structures can be prepared.

== See also ==
- Cyclooctadecanonaene, the compound consisting of just the outer ring without the benzene core
- Hexa-peri-hexabenzocoronene, hexa-cata-hexabenzocoronene, and circumcoronene, consisting of additional benzene rings fused around the periphery

== Cited sources ==
- Haynes, William M., ed. (2016). CRC Handbook of Chemistry and Physics (97th ed.). CRC Press. ISBN 978-1-4987-5429-3.
