= F15 =

F15 or F-15 may refer to:

== Aircraft ==
- Boeing F-15EX Eagle II, a development of the F-15E Strike Eagle
- McDonnell Douglas F-15 Eagle, an American-designed air-superiority fighter aircraft
- McDonnell Douglas F-15 STOL/MTD, a technology demonstrator based on the F-15 Eagle
- McDonnell Douglas F-15E Strike Eagle, an all weather strike fighter derived from the F-15 Eagle
- Northrop F-15 Reporter, a photo-reconnaissance variant of the P-61 Black Widow
- Curtiss XF15C, a 1940s U.S. Navy fighter prototype

== Video games ==
- F-15 City Wars, a 1990 video game developed by American Video Entertainment on Nintendo
- F-15 Strike Eagle (video game), a 1984 video game
- F-15 Strike Eagle II, a 1989 video game
- F-15 Strike Eagle III, a 1993 video game
- Jane's F-15, a 1998 video game

== Other uses ==
- BMW X5 (F15), a mid-size luxury crossover SUV
- F15 and F15A, the two Ford 15-hundredweight versions of the World War II Canadian Military Pattern trucks
- February 15, 2003 anti-war protest
- Fluorine-15 (F-15 or ^{15}F), an isotope of fluorine
- F15, a function key
- Italian submarine F15, a submarine of the Italian Regia Marina (Royal Navy) in commission from 1917 to 1929
