= C9H8O =

The molecular formula C_{9}H_{8}O may refer to:

- Acrylophenone, an organic compound
- Benzopyran, a polycyclic organic compound
- Cinnamaldehyde, an organic compound with the formula C_{6}H_{5}CH=CHCHO
- 1-Indanone, the organic compound with the formula C_{6}H_{4}(CH_{2})_{2}CO
