= Indenol =

- Chemical structure of 1-indenol

Identifiers
CAS Number	1-ol: 56631-57-3
3D model (JSmol)	1-ol: Interactive image
ChemSpider	1-ol: 280492
EC Number	1-ol: 260-294-3
PubChem CID	1-ol: 316919
CompTox Dashboard (EPA)	1-ol: DTXSID20972073
- InChI: 1-ol: InChI=1S/C9H8O/c10-9-6-5-7-3-1-2-4-8(7)9/h1-6,9-10H Key: KWRSKZMCJVFUGU-UHFFFAOYSA-N
- SMILES: 1-ol: C1=CC=C2C(C=CC2=C1)O

Properties
Chemical formula	C_{9}H_{8}O
Molar mass	132.162 g·mol^{−1}
- Except where otherwise noted, data are given for materials in their standard state (at 25 °C [77 °F], 100 kPa). Infobox references

Indenols are hydroxylated indene. 3-Indenol is an enol forms of 1-indanone, and 2-indenol is an enol form of 2-indanone. Isomerization of 1-indenol can produce 1-indanone. Indenolol is a derivative of a phenolic indenol.
