= Contorted aromatics =

Hydrocarbon compounds composed of rings fused such that the molecule is nonplanar

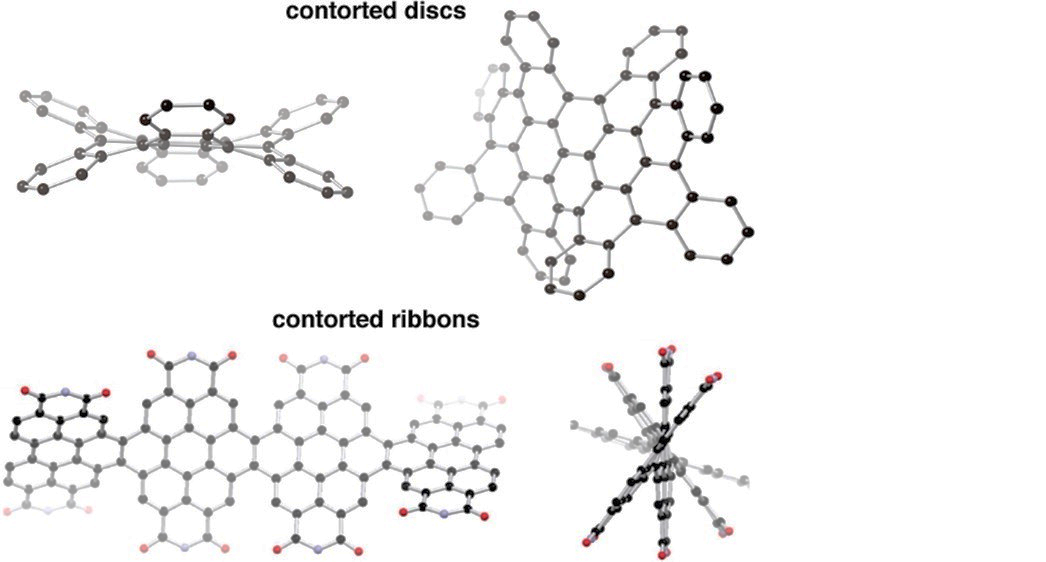
Fig. 1: Contorted PAH molecules. (discs and ribbons).

In organic chemistry, contorted aromatics, or more precisely contorted polycyclic aromatic hydrocarbons, are polycyclic aromatic hydrocarbons (PAHs) in which the fused aromatic molecules deviate from the usual planarity.

== Introduction ==
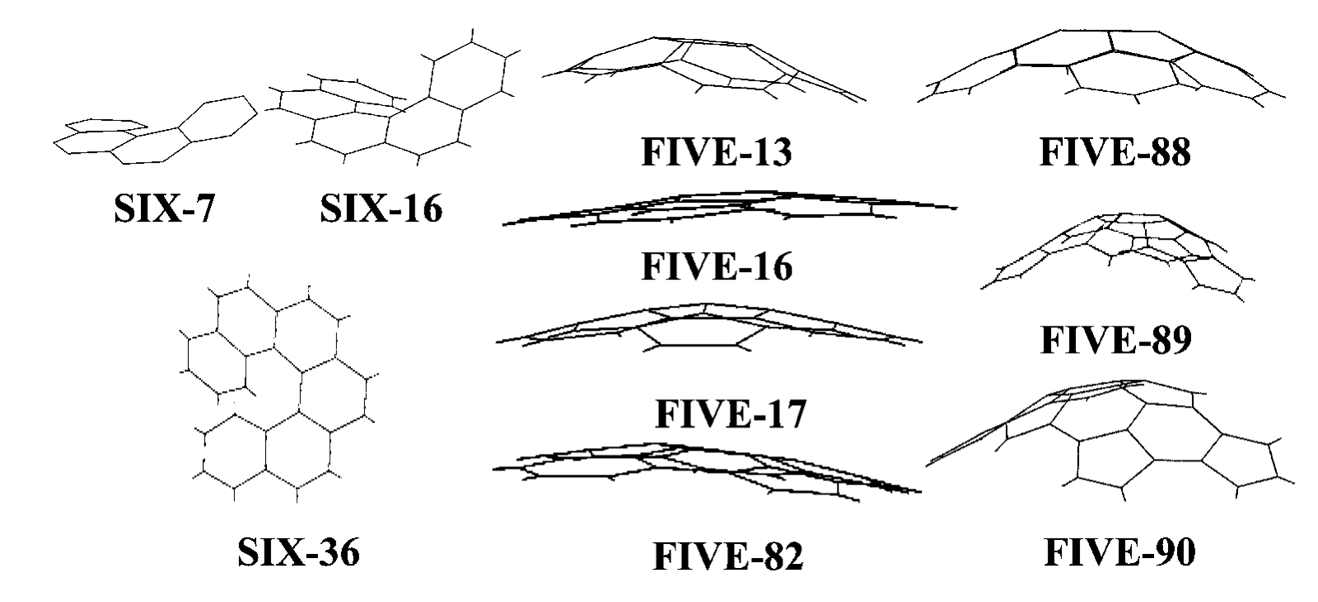
Fig. 2: 3D molecular diagrams showing arching FIVE-13,16,17,82,88,89,90 and splitting SIX-7,16,36 interactions. FIVE: PAH containing five-membered rings SIX: PAH containing only six-membered rings^{2}.

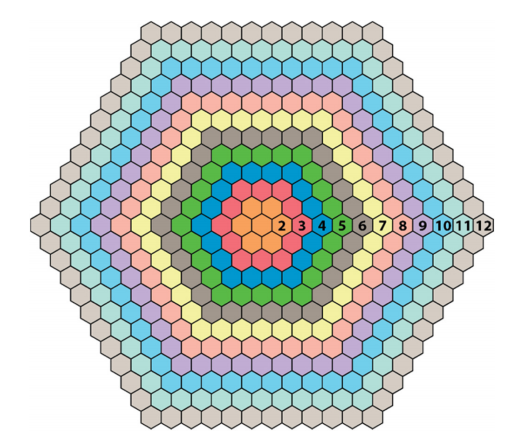
Fig. 3: C_{6n^{2}}H_{6n} (n = 2-12) coronenes (C_{24}H_{12} to C_{864}H_{72}). A stacked honey comb showing the C values n = 12.

The comparison of structures of graphene and fullerene can help comprehend the origin of curved pi surfaces and contortion in PAHs. Both graphene and fullerene bear resemblance in having sp^{2} hybridized carbons; however, exhibit different geometries (allotropes of carbon). The fact that fullerenes have five-membered rings incorporated among six-membered rings, makes them spherical whereas graphene remains planar due to the presence of exclusively all six-membered rings in it. In general, the ideal C−C bond length and angle for C−C−C or C−C−H is about 1.42 Å and 2π/3 respectively, whereas in corannulene structure, a five membered ring is surrounded by six-membered rings contributing to non-planarity in the molecule. This leads to change in bond angles and bond lengths rendering non-planarity in the structure. Such type of contortions in the structure of PAHs are known as 'arching distortions'. The hydrogen and carbon atoms of the PAH molecule which are either closest to one another due to non-planar structure or suffer from angle strain are known as the "saturated" ones and may serve as a source of 'splitting distortions' (see fig. 2).

The region of a contorted molecule having saturated hydrogens and carbons is known as bay region (having white spheres or saturated hydrogens) (see fig. 4).

Another reason for making the PAH molecules contorted may be the size of these molecules. Theoretical vibrational frequency studies of C_{6n^{2}}H_{6n} (n = 2-12) on coronenes using quantum chemical calculation (Hartree-Fock and DFT) show accelerated loss of planarity on increasing size of PAH molecules in-spite of having a stable structure due to conjugation, delocalization and aromatization. A gas phase coronene can be expected to switch to non-planar geometry around n = 9-12. The combined strain of arching and splitting distortion is thought to force the PAH molecules out of the plane and generate contortions. A switch to umbrella geometry may occur at n = 12 (see fig. 3).

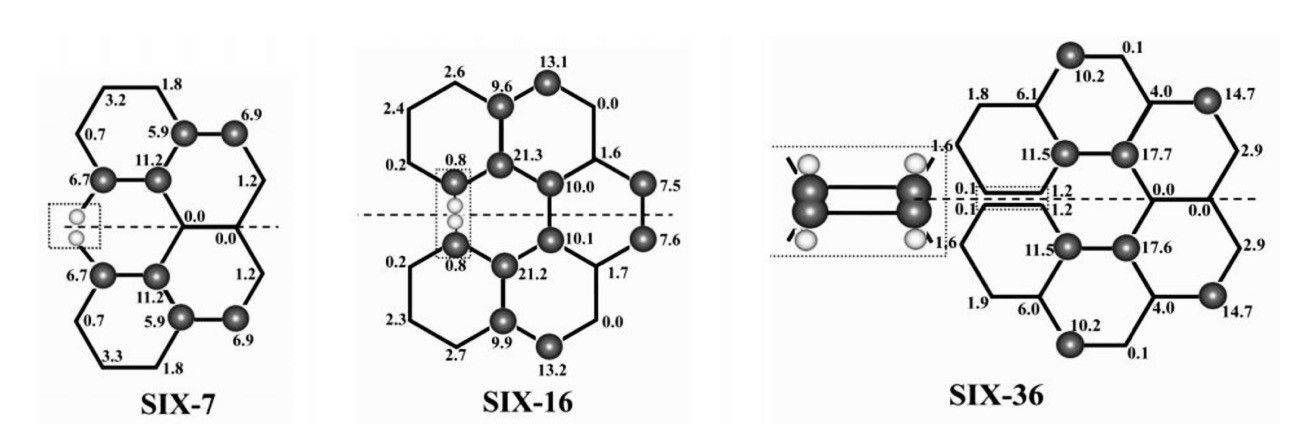
Fig. 4: Illustration of the strain energies carried by three different PAH molecules.

Figure 4 illustrates the strain energies carried by three different PAH molecules. The white spheres represent saturated hydrogens and the grey spheres as the leading carbons contributing to strain energy due to non-planar distortions.

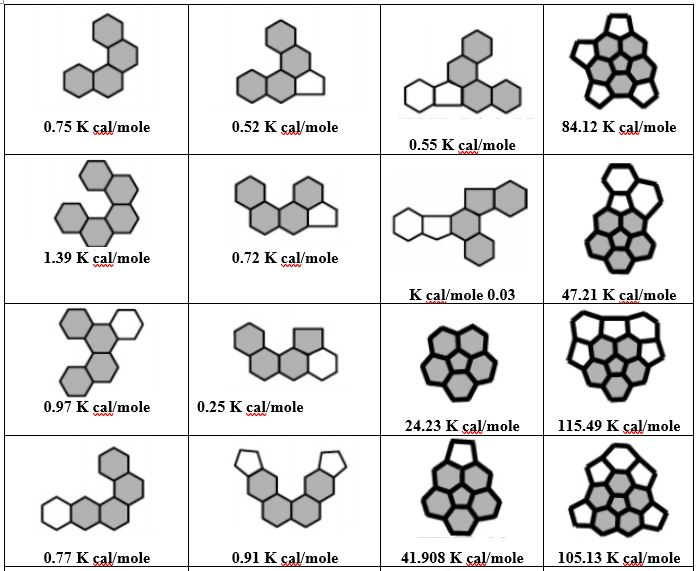
Table 1: Calculated E_{NP} (non-planar strain energy) values data for PAHs in kcal/mol

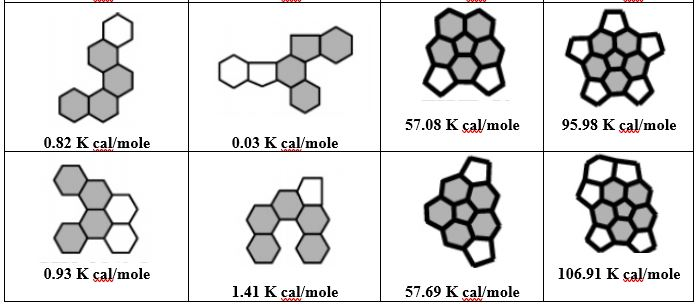
Table 1.1: Calculated E_{NP} (non-planar strain energy) values data for PAHs in kcal/mol

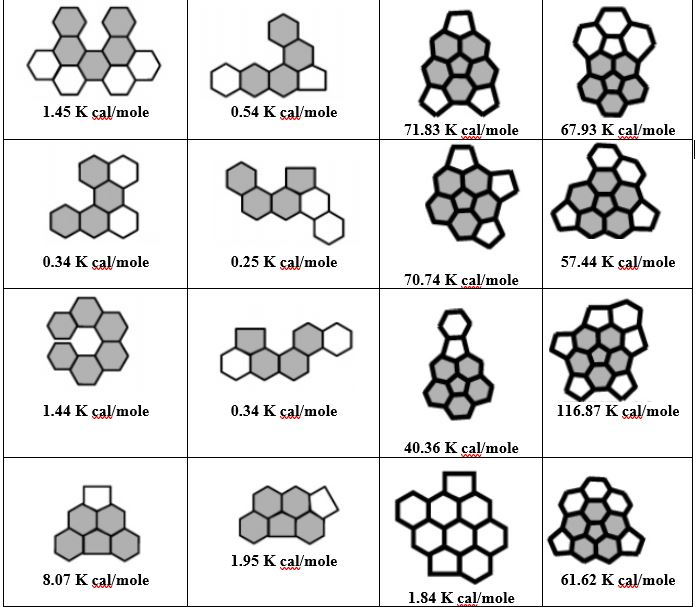
Table 1.2: Calculated E_{NP} (non-planar strain energy) values data for PAHs in kcal/mol

Table 1 shows the energy values for non-planarity (strain) of PAHs in kcal/mol for five-membered and six-membered ring molecules with common helicene and coronene units with reference to fullerenes C_{60} = 483.91 kcal/mol and C_{70} = 492.58 kcal/mol. The shaded parts indicate the bay regions in PAH molecules bearing the most strain. The strain energy is expressed in units of 10-2 kcal/mol. The E_{NP} non-planar strain (contortion) energies indicate how much a PAH molecule deviate from the standard planar structure in terms of bond angles and bond lengths. The standard for PAHs is usually graphite. An E_{NP} is introduced in the molecular structure whenever it deviates from the standard structural geometries to get the strain relief. The E_{NP} values represented for a variety of PAHs in Table 1 are shown. Two types of contortions or Enp can be observed based on the data in Table 1. The PAH molecules shown in table 1 are based on two kinds of motifs. The ones based on helicenes and the others on corannulenes. The small E_{NP} values (ranging from 0.25-8 kcal/mol) represented by the helicene based molecules and are because of weak contortions in their structures. The contributing factor seems to be the presence of only splitting distortions in the bay region of these PAHs. However, the other group based on corannulenes show higher E_{NP} values (ranging from 1.86-116 kcal/mol). The higher E_{NP} values suggest stronger contortions which may have originated due to the higher number of fused rings and a five-membered ring core in PAH molecules along with the bay region contortions.

Based on the above discussion it can be cautiously inferred that the combined effects of non-planar strain caused by arching and splitting distortions as well as the size of PAH molecules give birth to contortions in PAHs structures.

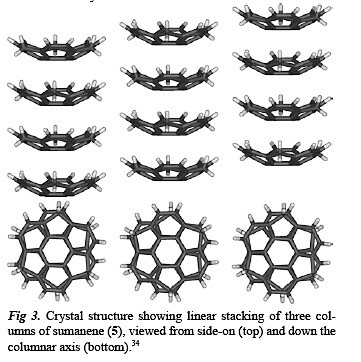
Figure 6: Crystal structure showing columnar stacks of disc-shaped sumanene units. Side view (top) and axial view (bottom)

These unparalleled contorted molecules exhibit wide absorption spectrum and enhanced charge transport properties which make them potential candidates for electronic and optoelectronic applications. The curvature in these molecules cause slight shifting of the frontier orbitals from ideal parallel symmetry. The departure from parallel overlap induces modification in HOMO and LUMO eventually giving birth to changed optical properties. Inversion of these molecules in solution may allow changes in orbital geometry, thereby, broadening the absorption and emission spectra which is useful for light-emitting diode (LED) applications. Some derivatives of corannulenes act as blue emitters. The efficient charge transport in contorted aromatic molecules is related with self-assembly and crystal packing. The discotic contorted molecules in crystals tilt relative to the columnar axis because of the interaction of protons with the electronic cloud of neighboring PAHs molecules. This tilt forbids the latitudinal stacking of molecules and allows only the longitudinal stacking (see fig 6). This property enhances the linear overlap of orbitals and promote the charge carrier mobility. All these properties make the contorted PAHs excellent candidates for semiconductor, organic field effect transistors (OFETs), and organic photovoltaic (OPV) devices applications.

Discs and ribbons (see Fig. 1) constitute the major classes of contorted aromatic structures. The discs possess a concave π molecular surface and upon substitution with a hydrocarbon side chain can be self- assembled to turn into columns figure5. These columns can express the desired properties of nanoscale phase separation, charge separation and charge transport in films. The concave discs can behave as molecular sensors for electron deficient aromatic molecules. Once in contact with electron acceptors like fullerenes they show typical characteristics of a p-n junction in shape of a ball and socket joint model Figure 7.

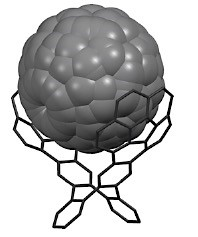
Figure 7: X-ray crystal structure of bucky catcher 30 and supramolecular complex with C_{60.}

The ribbons, on the other hand, can be envisioned as pieces of graphene being spun into ribbons owing to contortions. They are good materials for OFETs as electron transporting materials. With the incorporation of donor polymers they behave as potential alternative for non-fullerene based organic solar cells. The focus on developing the non-fullerene organic semiconductor is because of some potential

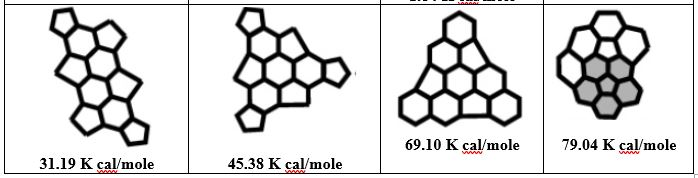
Table 1.3: Calculated E_{NP} (non-planar strain energy) values data for PAHs in kcal/mol

downsides of fullerene-based materials for n-type organic molecules. Fullerenes fail to fulfil the basic criterion of good organic semiconductors by not having good absorption in UV-Vis region and poor tunability upon substitution with various groups. These demands have fuelled research towards finding new materials including contorted aromatic molecule which possess fundamental qualities of wide absorption range and better charge transportation. These molecules also provide controlled π-π stacking in small domains and excellent charge percolation pathways.

== History ==
The Nobel Prize in Chemistry of 1953 won by Hermann Staudinger for characterizing macromolecules as polymers opened the gateway for a new field of materials. Ever since that time the polymers have been replacing conventional materials like wood, metals and now are widely used as conductors and semiconductors in commercialized products. The age of plastic based society really began in the wake of 1953's Nobel prize. It was later revealed in 1970 that some polymers can exhibit appropriate electrical conductivity. The thought would have been consolidated by the fact that graphite a purely carbon-based material was capable of electric conduction due to its expansive π conjugation system. The organic conductors are however, not as good as metal-based conductors. By late 1970s efforts were made for fabricating polymer-based power transmission lines, light weight motors and novel approaches for achieving superconductivity. Currently massive worldwide efforts for achieving higher power conversion efficiencies in OPVs, better hole carrier mobilities in OFETs in π-conjugated polymer domain are underway. The discovery of iodine doped polyacetylene and its electrical properties in 1977 fuelled the research work towards finding better and more efficient conjugated organic polymers. The '2000' Nobel Prize by Alan J. Heeger, Alan G. Macdiarmid, and Hideki Shirakawa in recognition of their contribution towards unravelling the polyacetylene figure electronics set another milestone in the journey of finding conducting polymers. Over the past two decades developments have been made in synthesizing new polymers like polythiophenes, polyphenylenes and polyphenylene sulphides and small organic molecules. The contorted aromatic molecules due to their properties of making ladder polymers, self-assembly and innate charge percolation pathways because of small domains and π stacking other than providing conjugations throughout their structure became another focal point for their use in a variety electronic application. These contorted molecules offer a delicate balance and phase separation which can promote the power conversion efficiency (PCE) close to theoretical limit of 20%. Widespread futuristic studies on synthesizing new small contorted aromatic molecules capable of being stable over longer period and higher PCE are being carried out.

== From inorganic semiconductors to Contorted Aromatic Small molecules ==
One may keep getting pestered by the simple question of why we need the organic solar cells? No wonder if the commercial inorganic silicon based solar cells had been doing fine no one would have ever thought of an alternative way of getting at the same point. The answer is very simple. Inorganic solar cells have their own pros and cons. But the point of concern would be to address the issues which have limit their wide spread use so far. One of the major drags in commercializing this technology on massive scale is the cost. Highly purified silicon production needs a lot of energy which would add to the cost of this technology on one hand and hurt the green chemistry on the other. Efforts are underway to bring about new ways to aggregate as much stacks of silicon material as possible to increase the PCE which does not seem to help as far as cost reduction is concerned. The inorganic solar panels are heavy and non-flexible. These factors count towards limiting this technology for mass adaptation and may not be able to compete with other green and cheap energy sources like wind and hydro power. Multi junction silicon based solar cells however, are the best so far for providing highest PCE 44.4%.

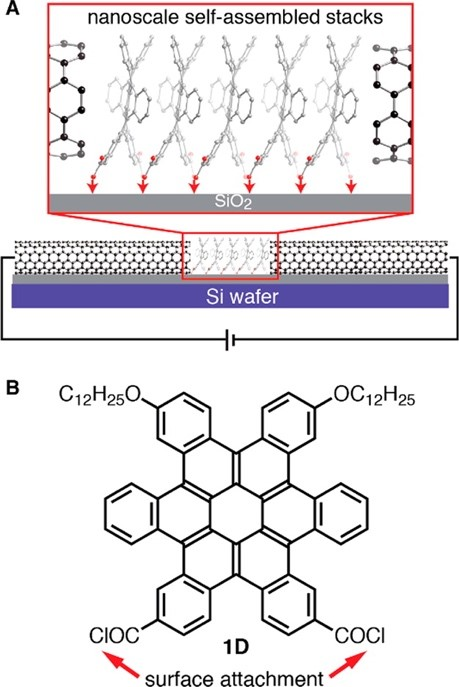
Fig. 5: (A) c-HBCs stacked between SWCNT contacts. (B) 1D: c-HBCs with acid chlorides forming a monolayer transistor channel b/w SWCNT contacts

All the above-mentioned challenges have been pushing the scientific community to seek for new opportunities. The organic solar cells seem to supersede their predecessors in many aspects but the challenge of competing with PCE remains. Unlike the inorganic solar cells, the material requirement for fabrication of OPV is much smaller. They can be printed out using printing tools which would help in low cost commercialization of these materials. Solution processable organic semiconductors can be easily fabricated into thin films. In short OPVs, OFETs and organic light emitting diodes OLEDs are light weight, flexible, easy to fabricate, inexpensive and tunable to demand as compared to the conventional inorganic materials. The downsides of organic small contorted molecules as semiconductors is their less reliable long-term usability and low PCE so far. The highest PCE for organic solar cell achieved so far is 11%.

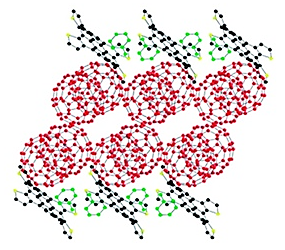
Fig. 8: Co-crystals of substituted c-DTTBC and C_{60.}Toluene molecules are shown in green. Planar heterojunction OPV in ball and socket joint model

When it comes to the reasons that limit OPVs power conversion efficiencies, we need to understand the structural and chemical limitations that existing organic small molecules offer.

The OPVs make use of a pair of electron acceptor fullerene or another non-fullerene (n-type) and electron donor moleculesC−C bond (p-type) creating heterojunctions within the active film. There are distinctive designs in which these molecules can be used in blends.

Mostly planar heterojunction (Fig.8) is used for fullerene based organic semiconductors in which the two molecules end up on top of each other to create a ball and socket joint model1. Bulk heterojunctions (Fig 8) have reportedly produced better PCEs when solution processed in single active layer. The use of fullerene in OPVs and semiconductors generate a variety of challenges that are detrimental for good light harvesting and power generation. Fullerenes do not give a strong absorption in visible (ε = 724 L mol^{−1} cm^{−1}) and near-IR region (ε = 7500 L mol^{−1} cm^{−1}) which reduces the charge generation capability for these devices. Since conduction in organic semiconductors is thermally activated phenomenon of hopping electrons through sp^{2} hybridized p-orbitals, therefore electron acceptors with better absorption in visible-near IR regions are superior performers. The fullerenes offer less tunability and poor electronic communication between the cage (C_{60} or C_{70}) and its substituent.

Another challenge is high probability of exciton recombination in fullerenes-based electron acceptors. Contrary to the inorganic semiconductors, the excitons formed in organic materials possess a higher binding energy (0.3-1.0 eV). This issue is resolved at the acceptor donor interface by matching HOMO (donor) and LUMO (acceptor) energy gaps. Planar heterojunction (PHJ) is the commonly used OPV architecture in which donor and acceptors molecules are joined with one another. The contorted PAHs owing to their non-polar and non-planar topology and shape are expected to offer a balance between miscibility and self-aggregation for optimal charge transport to electrodes. These contorted conjugated aromatic molecules support the charge transport due to resonance of electrons and hinder the possibility of electron hole pair recombination for having suitable HOMO and LUMO offsets at donor and acceptor interphase while allowing the antagonistic charge percolation pathways.

== Self-Assembled Materials ==
These contorted molecules show the remarkable phenomenon of self-assembly. Based upon the data collected from OFET and OPVs, these molecules show efficient charge transport. The c-HBC, c-OCBC and c-DBTTC act as electron donors and c-PDIs as electron acceptors. The contorted non-planar structure allows these molecules to express sufficient charge transport in self-assembled layers. The self-assembly characteristics change in case of alkyl chain derivatives of c-HBC into orthorhombic crystalline cables which act as p-type semiconductors. The contorted peripheral edges of these molecules serve to provide unique intermolecular contacts which make these molecules efficient in charge transport. The tetra-dodecaloxy side chains in c-HBC promotes the self-assembly. These materials are deposited in the form of columnar hexagonal liquid crystals. The main aromatic core transport the charges and side chains act as insulators. In thin film, the columns arrange themselves parallel to the surface and allow lateral charge transport.

== Designing and Synthesis of Contorted PAHs ==
Influenced by fullerenes themselves, the following structural features are incorporated into the non-fullerene-based electron acceptors. Figure 9

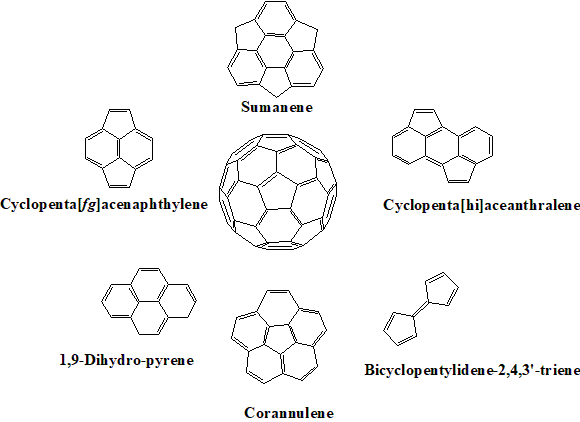
Fig. 9. Fullerene scaffolds used in the development of contorted aromatic PAHs. Sumanene^{3}, Corannulene^{3}, Cyclopenta[fg]acenaphtylene, cyclopenta[hi]aceanthralene, 1,9-dihydro-pyrene

=== Cyclopentafused Contorted PAHs ===
More recently a Pd-catalyzed cyclopentannulation followed by Scholl cyclodehydrogenation devised by Kyle Plunkett's research group has been found valuable for synthesizing the five-membered ring core poly aromatic contorted molecules. Based on the hypothesis that the five membered cyclopentaaceanthralene core is a part of the fullerene itself and can help assist conjugation in the molecule in its substituted form.

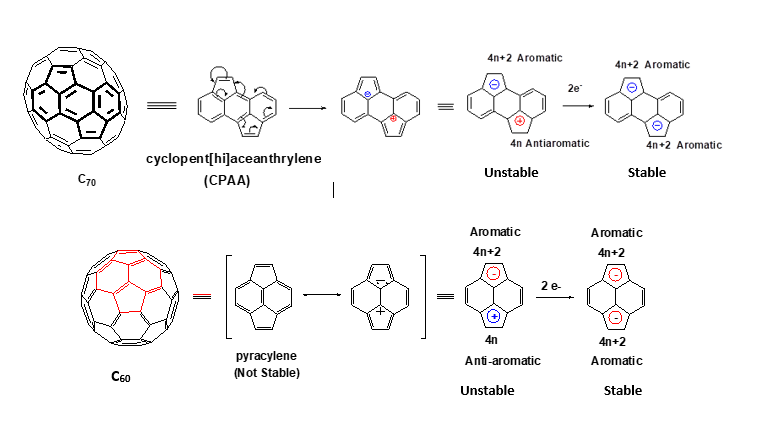
Fig.10: C_{60} and C_{70} with their scaffolds used to develop contorted PAHs

The resonance structures Figure 10 show that the five-membered aromatic ring core can accept a pair of electrons in one of its (anti aromatic) resonance structures to afford cyclopentadienyl anion (aromatic) rings and thus can behave as a good electron acceptor molecule. The tendency to achieve low energy aromatic structure makes it a good electron acceptor core. This methodology helps in relatively easy extension of conjugated aromatic core of the molecule which serves as a conduit for charge transfer. These contorted aromatic molecules provide better solubility and solution processability besides exhibiting the π stacking in solid state. The contortions thus enhance the π-stacking ability through a lock and key like model by giving reasonable phase separation favorable for isotropic charge transport.

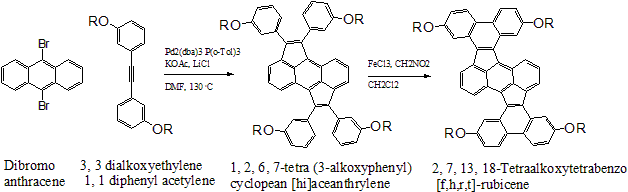
Scheme I. synthesis of contorted aromatic molecule through pd catalyzed cyclopentannulation

The synthetic scheme-I shows the use of above mentioned cyclopentadienyl anion scaffold in synthesizing contorted aromatic molecules. The reaction of dibromoanthracene with 3,3 dialkoxy 1,1 diphenyl acetylene (R=CH_{3}, C_{12}H_{25}) in the presence of Pd_{2}(dba)_{3} P(o-tol)_{3}, KOAc, LiCl, and DMF gives 1,2,6,7-tetra(3-alkoxyphenyl)cyclopenta[hi]aceanthrylene which after Scholl cyclodehydrogenation affords 2,7,13,18-Tetraalkoxytetrabenzo[f,h,r,t]-rubicene.

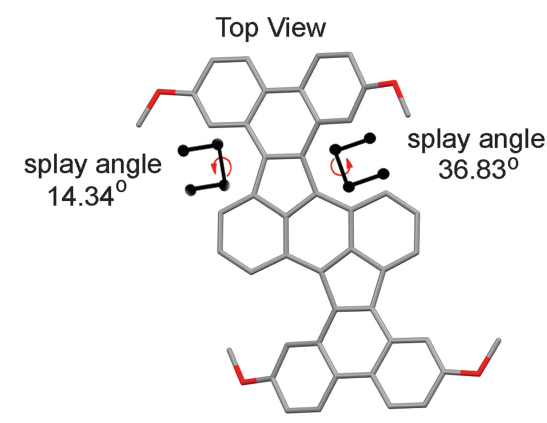
Figure 11. 2,7,13,18-Tetraalkoxytetrabenzo[f,h,r,t]-rubicene

The crystal structure figure 11 of above shown compound 2, 7, 13, 18-Tetraalkoxytetrabenzo [f,h,r,t]-rubicene in scheme 1 shows the non-planar contorted structure. The splay angles of bay regions manifest the contorted structure. So the synthesis of cyclopentafused contorted PAHs can be done by this method. The contortion enhances the solubility of these molecules compared to their planar counterparts.

== Device Fabrication And Testing ==
These contorted PAH molecules are used in the fabrication of OFET devices in form of a thin film to test their semiconducting properties (Figure 12). The contorted PAHs are usually used as solution on an insulator dielectric layer of SiO_{2}/Si substrate. Three electrodes source (S) drain (D) and gate (G) are affixed for providing potential and charge measurement. A significantly higher than the threshold value of voltage is applied between gate and source V_{GS} which generates positive (p-type) channel at the semiconductor and dielectric interface. On applying a negative voltage from source to drain V_{SD}, the hole flows from source to drain which is also equivalent to flow of electron in opposite direction. By increasing the V_{GS} the flow of current from drain/source I_{DS} increases. The process continues until the maximum value of current "pinch off" reaches at which point the positive channel gets saturated on one side. Data at different V_{GS} values is collected and plotted in the form of an output plot for c-HBC with tetra-dodecyloxy side chains as shown in Figure 5. The p-type semiconductors exhibit negative V_{SD} & V_{GS} values and vice versa for n-type semiconductors.

Plotting with the (I_{D-S})^{1/2} Vs V_{G} (transfer plot) gives the slope for calculation of mobility.

μ(mobility)=2L/W_{Ci} ($d\sqrt{I}_{D-S}/(d_{V-G})^2$

Where,

L' is the Channel length

W' …….. Channel width

Ci' ……. Capacitance in F/cm^{2}

d_{VG}' …….. Slope of the transfer plot

The units of mobility are cm^{2}/ V.s

The c-HBC, c-OCBC and c-DBTTC and their many derivatives act as p-type and c-PDI and its oligomers as electron acceptors. Experiments indicate that the photon conversion efficiency of contorted c-HBC is better than the planar HBC in OPVs1. The contorted shape enhances the electronics properties of the molecules by building intimate structural interfaces between donor and acceptors. The c-PDI dimers on the other hand show better electron mobility (~10^{−2} cm^{2} V^{−1} s^{−1}), electron acceptability and almost similar LUMO levels as fullerenes.

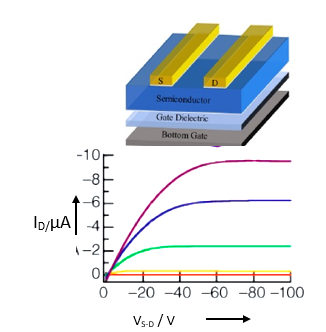
Figure 12. OFET fabricated with semiconductor film (top) OFET output plot (bottom). Gate voltage from 20 V (red)-100 V (purple) in 20 V increments.

== Applications ==
The generalized applications of contorted PAHs and organic semiconductors are given as follows.

=== Organic Light Emitting Diodes ===
The organic semiconductors are being used as OLEDs in various electronic display applications. Philips launched Sensotech Philishave in 2002 featuring first OLED based display panel. Kodak has also introduced LS633 digital camera with award winning OLED display technology. Sony also produced a 27" OLED prototype TV88

=== Organic Photovoltaic Cells ===
Another extensively researched area toward the applications of organic semiconductors is light harvesting. The current photon conversion efficiency may be an obstacle in commercialization of this technology but there are many attractive features like low cost, flexibility and miniaturization attached.

=== Organic Field Effect Transistors ===
OFETs being another exciting application of organic semiconductors. This technology with the right pre-requisites hold enough potential to revolutionise the existing technologies in use.

=== Smart Textiles ===
The flexibility and light weight feature of organic semiconductors offer futuristic applications like smart fabric for health care, military, sporting and space exploration ventures. This will allow the real time observation of the person's health wearing these fabrics.

=== Healthcare ===
Organic light emitting diodes can also be used in photodynamic therapy for skin cancer and cosmetic industry for antiaging treatment.

=== Flexible Screen and Displays Units ===
Flexibility gives another edge to organic semiconductors being better than inorganic semiconductors. This technology may allow us to have screens capable of rolling into small devices. Philips has made a black and white prototype

=== Lab on a Chip ===
The organic semiconducting technology is replacing silicon and may one day achieve the goal of having a lab on a chip.

The contorted aromatic molecules offer a wide variety of tuning and suitability options. Both electron acceptor (n-type) and electron donor (p-type) contorted molecules can be manufactured. The non-planar structure offers self-assembly characteristics leading to simultaneously optimized miscibility and phase separation. The charge mobility of contorted aromatic molecules being higher in two orders of magnitude than the planar structures points towards them having well-tuned charge percolation pathways. There is still a long way to go from 11% of PCE to theoretical maximum of 20%. If the researchers are able to strike the right balance between miscibility and phase separation of these materials and tune the orbitals correctly they may be able to find the best organic semiconductors.

== See also ==
- Geodesic polyarene
