= Indanol dehydrogenase =

indanol dehydrogenase

Identifiers
- EC no.: 1.1.1.112
- CAS no.: 37250-43-4

Databases
- IntEnz: IntEnz view
- BRENDA: BRENDA entry
- ExPASy: NiceZyme view
- KEGG: KEGG entry
- MetaCyc: metabolic pathway
- PRIAM: profile
- PDB structures: RCSB PDB PDBe PDBsum
- Gene Ontology: AmiGO / QuickGO
Search
- PMC: articles
- PubMed: articles
- NCBI: proteins

In enzymology, indanol dehydrogenase (EC 1.1.1.112) is an enzyme that catalyzes the chemical reaction

Indan-1-ol
+ NAD^{+}
H^{+}
H^{+}
1-Indanone
+ NADH

The two substrates of this enzyme are indan-1-ol and oxidised nicotinamide adenine dinucleotide (NAD^{+}). Its products are 1-indanone, reduced NADH and a proton. The enzyme can use the alternative cofactor, nicotinamide adenine dinucleotide phosphate.

This enzyme belongs to the family of oxidoreductases, specifically those acting on the CH-OH group of donor with NAD^{+} or NADP^{+} as acceptor. The systematic name of this enzyme class is indan-1-ol:NAD(P)^{+} 1-oxidoreductase.
