= Polycyclic =

Polycyclic may refer to:

- Polycyclic compound, a cyclic compound with more than one hydrocarbon loop or ring structures, including:
  - Polycyclic musks
  - Polycyclic aromatic hydrocarbon
    - Chlorinated polycyclic aromatic hydrocarbon
    - Contorted polycyclic aromatic hydrocarbon
- Polycyclic group, in mathematics, a solvable group that satisfies the maximal condition on subgroups
- Polycyclic spawning, when an animal reproduces multiple times during its lifespan
