= Picrotoxin =

Chemical compound

Picrotoxinin (left) and picrotin (right)

Clinical data
- ATC code: none

Identifiers
- CAS Number: 124-87-8
- PubChem CID: 5360688
- IUPHAR/BPS: 4051
- DrugBank: DB00466
- ChemSpider: 16736444
- UNII: ZLT174DL7U
- KEGG: C09529
- ChEBI: CHEBI:134126
- ChEMBL: ChEMBL506977
- CompTox Dashboard (EPA): DTXSID7045605
- ECHA InfoCard: 100.004.288

Chemical and physical data
- 3D model (JSmol): Interactive image
- SMILES: CC(=C)[C@H]1[C@@H]2C(=O)O[C@H]1[C@H]3OC(=O)[C@@]54O[C@@H]5C[C@]2(O)[C@@]34C.CC(C)(O)[C@H]5[C@@H]1C(=O)O[C@H]5[C@H]2OC(=O)[C@@]43O[C@@H]4C[C@]1(O)[C@@]23C
- InChI: InChI=1S/C15H18O7.C15H16O6/c1-12(2,18)6-7-10(16)20-8(6)9-13(3)14(7,19)4-5-15(13,22-5)11(17)21-9;1-5(2)7-8-11(16)19-9(7)10-13(3)14(8,18)4-6-15(13,21-6)12(17)20-10/h5-9,18-19H,4H2,1-3H3;6-10,18H,1,4H2,2-3H3/t5-,6+,7-,8-,9-,13-,14-,15+;6-,7+,8-,9-,10-,13-,14-,15+/m11/s1; Key:VJKUPQSHOVKBCO-AHMKVGDJSA-N

Picrotoxin, also known as cocculin, is a poisonous crystalline plant compound. It was first isolated by the French pharmacist and chemist Pierre François Guillaume Boullay (1777–1869) in 1812. The name "picrotoxin" is a combination of the Greek words "picros" (bitter) and "toxicon" (poison). A mixture of two different compounds, picrotoxin occurs naturally in the fruit of the Anamirta cocculus plant, although it can also be synthesized chemically.

Due to its interactions with the inhibitory neurotransmitter GABA, picrotoxin acts as a stimulant and convulsant. It mainly impacts the central nervous system, causing seizures and respiratory paralysis in high enough doses.

== Chemical structure and synthesis ==
Picrotoxin is an equimolar mixture of two compounds, picrotoxinin (C_{15}H_{16}O_{6}; CAS# 17617-45-7) and picrotin (C_{15}H_{18}O_{7}; CAS# 21416-53-5). Of the two compounds, picrotin is less active.

Picrotoxin occurs naturally in the fruit of the Anamirta cocculus, a climbing plant from India and other parts of Southeast Asia. The plant is known for its large stems of white wood and sweetly-scented flowers. It produces small stone fruits, Cocculus indicus, which are typically dried.

Currently, there are as many as five total syntheses of picrotoxinin — one of which was published as recently as June 2020. Most syntheses use carvone as a stereochemical template.

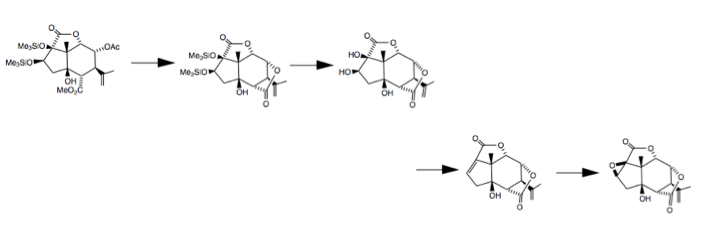
The final few steps of the Tohoku picrotoxinin synthesis from carvone.

In 1988, researchers from Tohoku University in Japan completed a total stereoselective synthesis of both (‑)‑picrotoxinin and (-)-picrotin beginning with (+)‑5β‑hydroxycarvone. In this synthesis, eight asymmetric centers were stereoselectively prepared on a cis-fused hydrindane ring system using several different reactions: a Claisen rearrangement to introduce the quaternary center, an organoselenium-mediated reduction of an epoxy ketone, and a stereospecific construction of a glycidic ester.

The June 2020 synthesis instead employed the quick formation of the polycyclic core, followed by the manipulation of oxidation states of key carbon atoms in order to produce the target molecule.

Some research suggests that picritoxin can be made by the cyclofunctionalization of cycloalkenyl systems. Under kinetically controlled conditions, this process generally results in exo cyclization and forms bridged ring systems like those found in picrotoxin.

Several techniques have been developed to isolate picrotoxinin and picrotin individually. Reaction with the nearby cis alcohol is the key obstruction, and can be inhibited by pretreatment (protection) with trifluoroacetic anhydride in pyridine:

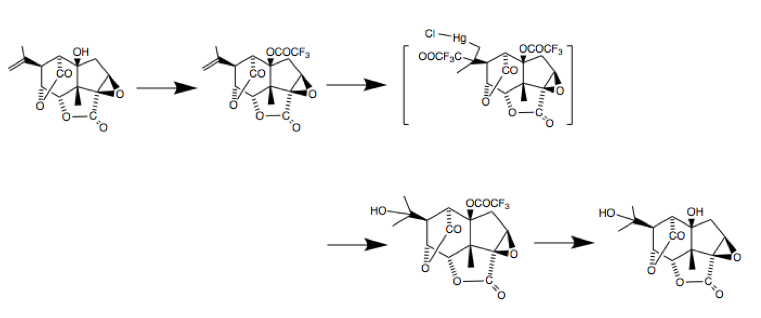

Picrotoxin has also been used as a starting material in several synthetic processes, including the creation of dl-picrotoxadiene, which retains certain features of the picrotoxin skeleton.

== Mechanism of action ==
Some crustacean muscle fibers have excitatory and inhibitory innervation. Picrotoxin blocks inhibition. Two different but related theories have been proposed for the mechanism by which picrotoxin acts on synapses. One theory is that it acts as a non-competitive channel blocker for GABA_{A} receptor chloride channels, specifically the gamma-aminobutyric acid-activated chloride ionophore. A 2006 study found that, while not structurally similar to GABA, picrotoxin prevents ion flow through the chloride channels activated by GABA. It likely acts within the ion channels themselves, rather than at GABA recognition sites. Because it inhibits channels activated by GABA, GABA-enhancing drugs like barbiturates and benzodiazepines can be used as an antidote.

Other research suggests that the toxin acts instead as a non-competitive antagonist, or inhibitor, for GABA receptors. A study by Newland and Cull-Candy found that, in high enough concentrations, picrotoxin reduced the amplitude of GABA currents. Their data indicated that it was unlikely that picrotoxin acted simply as a voltage-gated channel blocker, although it did reduce the frequency of channel openings. Rather, they found that picrotoxin “binds preferentially to an agonist bound form of the receptor.” This means that, even in the presence of low concentrations of picrotoxin, the response of neurons to GABA is reduced.

== Toxicity ==
Picrotoxin acts as a central nervous system and respiratory stimulant. It is extremely toxic to fish and humans, as well as rodents and other mammals. According to the Register of Toxic Effects of Chemical Substances, the LDLo, or lowest reported lethal dose, is 0.357 mg/kg. Symptoms of picrotoxin poisoning include coughing, difficulty breathing, headache, dizziness, confusion, gastro-intestinal distress, nausea or vomiting, and changes in heart rate and blood pressure. Although especially dangerous if swallowed, systemic effects can also result from inhalation or absorption into the blood stream through lesions in the skin. Picrotoxin also acts as a convulsant. In larger doses, it has been found to induce clonic seizures or cardiac dysrhythmias, with especially high doses ultimately proving fatal, typically due to respiratory paralysis.

== Clinical applications and other uses ==
Due to its toxicity, picrotoxin is now most commonly used as a research tool. However, due to its antagonist effect on GABA receptors, it has been used as a central nervous system stimulant. It was also previously used as an antidote for poisoning by CNS depressants, especially barbiturates.

Although not commonly used, picrotoxin is effective as both a pesticide and a pediculicide. In the 19th century, it was used in the preparation of hard multum, which was added to beer to make it more intoxicating. This preparation has since been outlawed.

Despite its potential toxicity to mammals in large enough doses, picrotoxin is also sometimes used as a performance enhancer in horses. It is classified as an illegal "Class I substance" by the American Quarter Horse Association. Substances that are classified as “Class I” are likely to affect performance and have no therapeutic use in equine medicine. In 2010, quarter horse trainer Robert Dimitt was suspended after his horse, Stoli Signature, tested positive for the substance. As with humans, it is used to counteract barbiturate poisoning.

== See also ==
- GABA_{A} receptor negative allosteric modulator
- GABA_{A} receptor § Ligands
