= C9H9NO =

The molecular formula C_{9}H_{9}NO (molar mass: 147.18 g/mol) may refer to:

- Indole-3-carbinol
- 2-Indanone oxime
