= Sumanene =

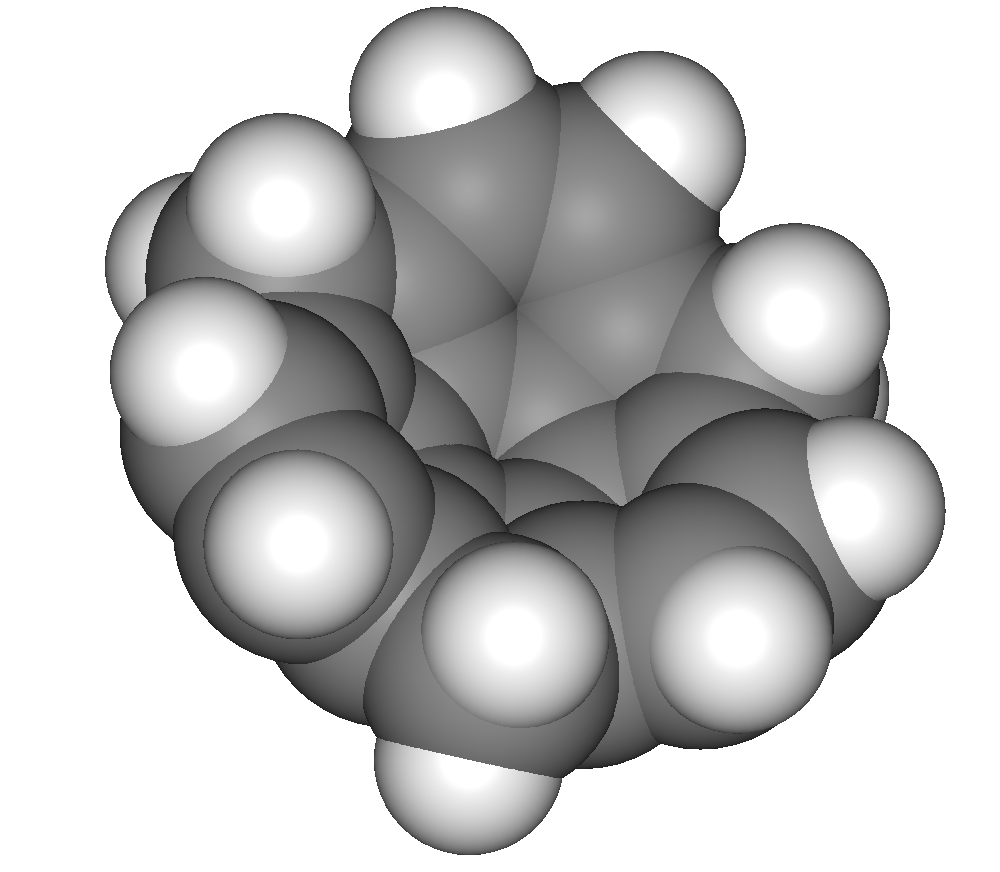

Names
- Preferred IUPAC name 4,7-Dihydro-1H-tricyclopenta[def,jkl,pqr]triphenylene

Identifiers
CAS Number	151253-59-7
3D model (JSmol)	Interactive image
ChemSpider	9348199
PubChem CID	11173107
UNII	TX2KR8MQM9
CompTox Dashboard (EPA)	DTXSID20894120
- InChI: InChI=1S/C21H12/c1-2-11-8-13-5-6-15-9-14-4-3-12-7-10(1)16-17(11)19(13)21(15)20(14)18(12)16/h1-6H,7-9H2 Key: WOYKPMSXBVTRKZ-UHFFFAOYSA-N; InChI=1/C21H12/c1-2-11-8-13-5-6-15-9-14-4-3-12-7-10(1)16-17(11)19(13)21(15)20(14)18(12)16/h1-6H,7-9H2 Key: WOYKPMSXBVTRKZ-UHFFFAOYAE
- SMILES: C16=C5C4=C3C2=C1C7=CC=C2CC3=CC=C4CC5=CC=C6C7

Properties
Chemical formula	C_{21}H_{12}
Molar mass	264.32
- Except where otherwise noted, data are given for materials in their standard state (at 25 °C [77 °F], 100 kPa). verify (what is ?) Infobox references

Sumanene is a polycyclic aromatic hydrocarbon and of scientific interest because the molecule can be considered a fragment of buckminsterfullerene. Due to this connection and also its bowl shape, Sumanene is also known as a buckybowl. Suman means "flower" in both Hindi and Sanskrit. The core of the arene is a benzene ring and the periphery consists of alternating benzene rings (3) and cyclopentadiene rings (3). Unlike fullerene, sumanene has benzyl positions which are available for organic reactions.

== Organic synthesis ==
The structure of Sumanene can be inferred from oxidation of 1,5,9-trimethyltriphenylene but the first practical synthesis starts from norbornadiene. Norbornadiene is converted into a stannane by action of n-butyllithium, dibromoethane and tributyltinchloride. An Ullmann reaction of this stannane with CuTC affords the benzene core. The methylene bridges (−CH_{2}−) created in this conversion then migrate in a tandem ring-opening metathesis and ring-closing metathesis by the Grubbs' catalyst. The final structure is obtained by oxidation by DDQ.

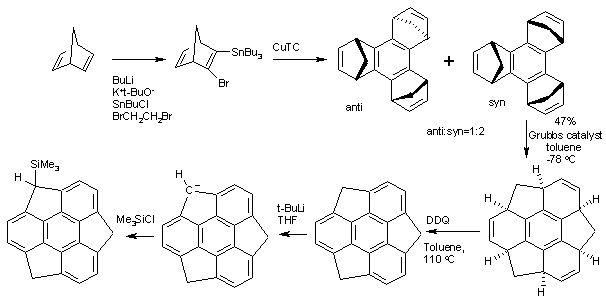

== Properties ==
Sumanene is a bowl-shaped molecule with a bowl depth of 118 picometers. The 6 hub carbon atoms are pyramidalized by 9° and the molecule displays considerable bond alternation (138.1 to 143.1 pm). Sumanene also experiences bowl-to-bowl inversion with an inversion barrier of 19.6 kcal/mol (82 kJ/mol) at 140 °C which is much higher than that found for its corannulene cousin. Like any benzylic proton, the sumanene protons can be abstracted by a strong base such as t-butyl lithium to form the sumanene mono carbanion. This strong nucleophile can react with an electrophile such as trimethylsilyl chloride to the trimethylsilyl derivative.

The trianion has also been reported. Electron transport properties have been investigated as well as carbon NMR

== Derivatives ==
Sumanene derivatives such as naphtosumanene and trisialsumanene have been described. Chiral sumanenes are of some interest with respect to inherent chirality, examples are chiral trimethylsumanene and a chiral sumanene cyclopentadienyl iron complex

== See also ==
- Corannulene
- Coronene
- Geodesic polyarene
- Helicene
