= Geodesic polyarene =

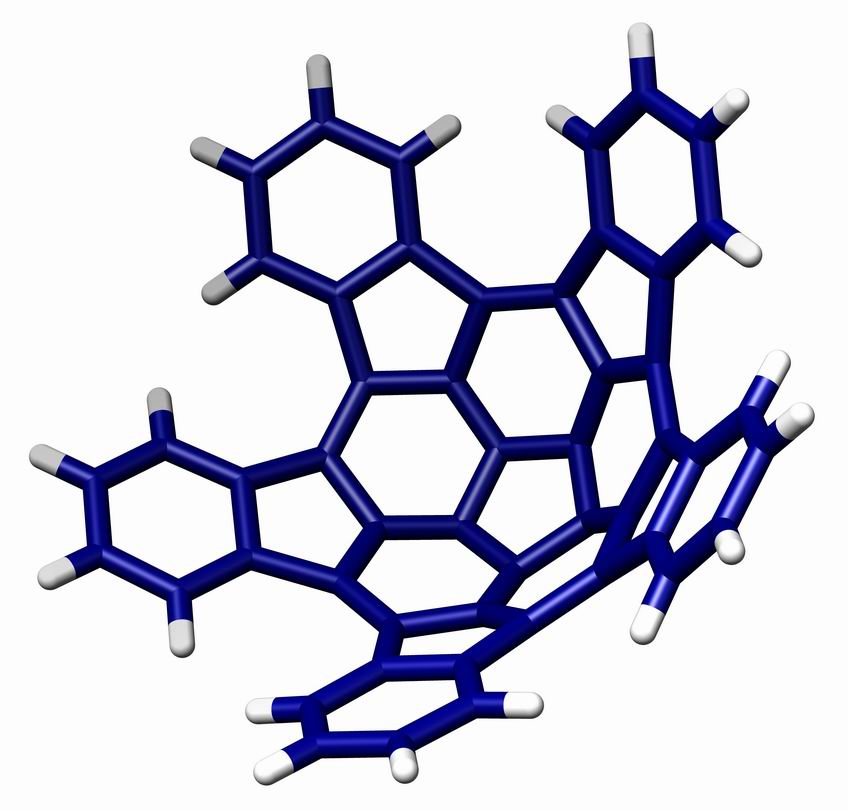
Crystal structure of pentaindenocorannulene.

A geodesic polyarene in organic chemistry is a polycyclic aromatic hydrocarbon with curved convex or concave surfaces. Examples include fullerenes, nanotubes, corannulenes, helicenes and sumanene. The molecular orbitals of the carbon atoms in these systems are to some extent pyramidalized, resulting in a different pi electron density on either side of the molecule with consequences for reactivity.

One member of this group of organic compounds, pentaindenocorannulene (depicted below), can be considered a large fullerene fragment. The experimentally obtained curvature and degree of pyramidalization (12.6° for the carbons of the pentagon at the center) are both actually larger than that of fullerene but according to its discoverers, the compound is relatively easy to synthesize starting from corannulene and a way is opened to produce larger such fragments by stitching.

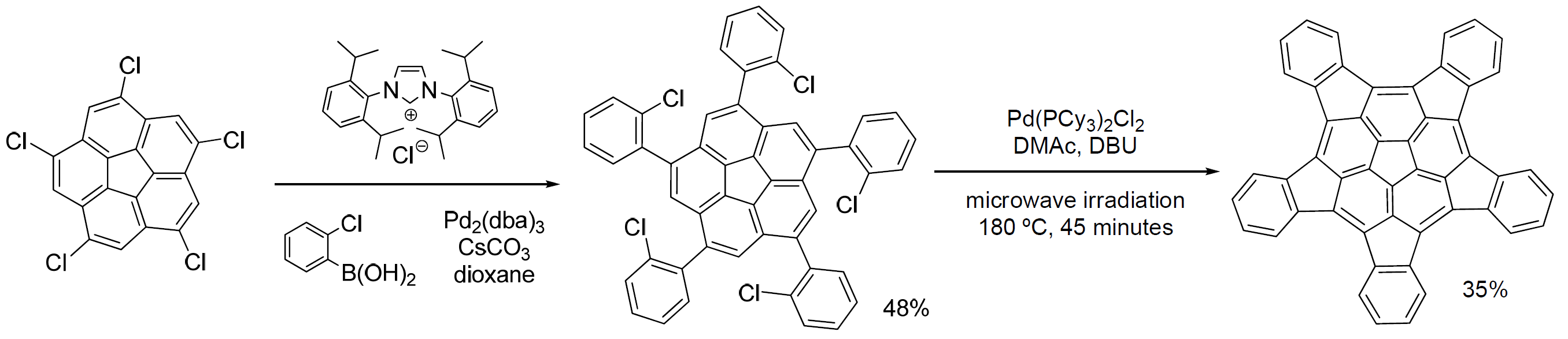

The crystal structure of pentaindenocorannulene has been obtained. An illustration of the crystal packing for pentaindenocorannulene is given below.

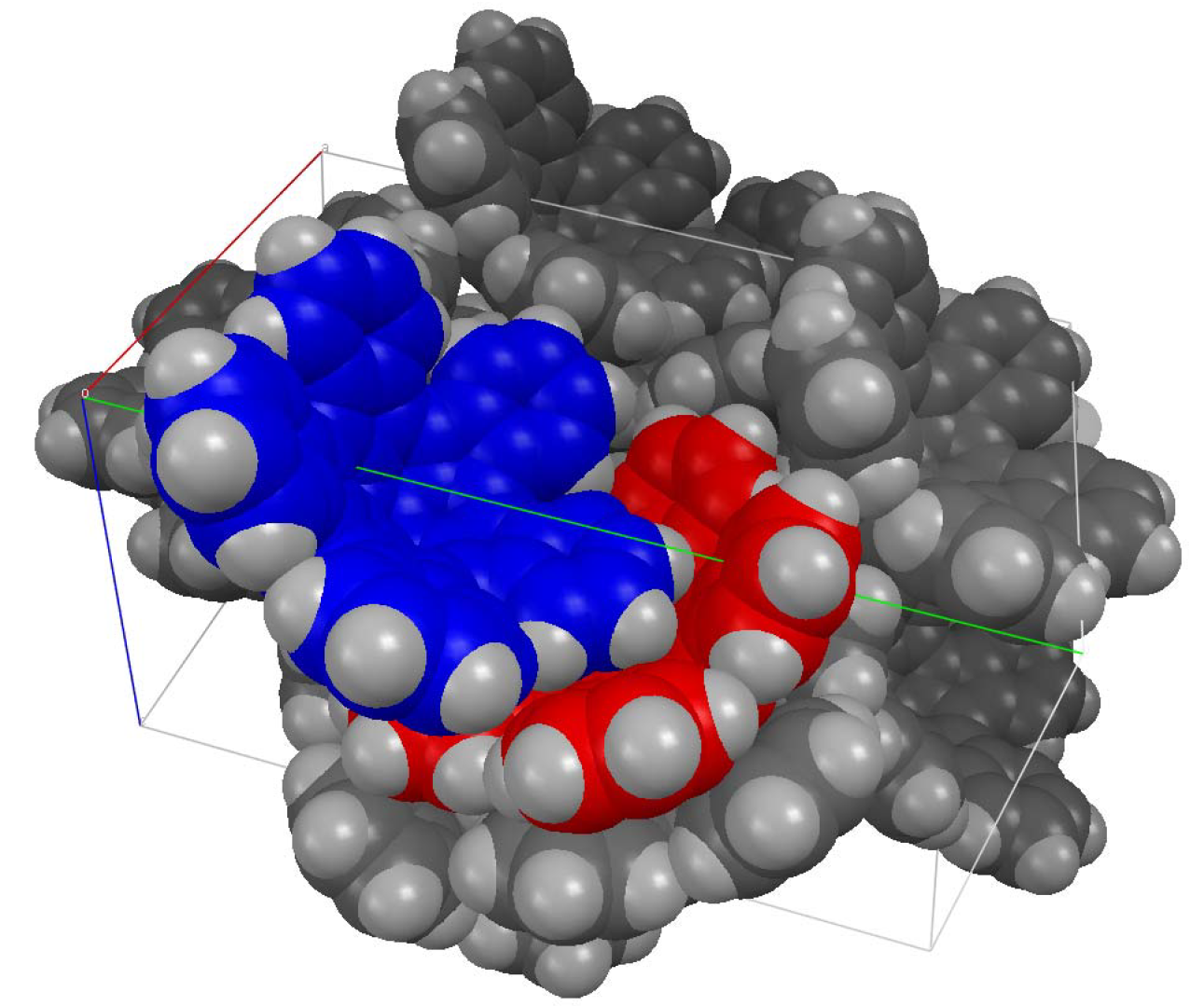

Another geodesic polyarene that has been synthesized is C_{50}H_{10}. C_{50}H_{10} can be described as a short, rigid, structurally pure [5,5] carbon nanotube. The crystal structure of C_{50}H_{10} has been obtained. The carbons of the pentagon at the center of C_{50}H_{10} have a POAV angle of 12.3°, less than that of pentaindenocorannulene. The synthesis is as shown below. FVP stands for flash vacuum pyrolysis.

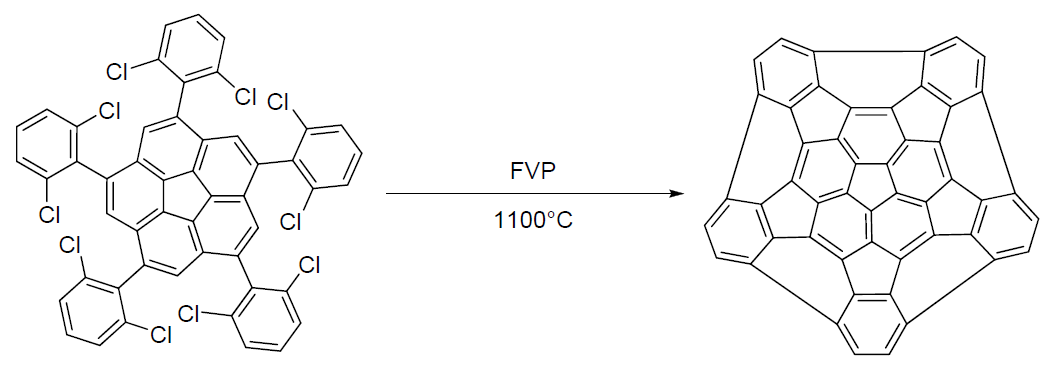

Some bowl-shaped molecules reported in the literature are in fact partially hydrogenated. A C_{56}H_{40} hydrocarbon has been synthesized containing 54 of the 60 carbon atoms found in fullerene

== See also ==
- Carbon nanotube
- Contorted aromatics
- Corannulene
- Fullerene chemistry
- Helicene
- Sumanene
