= 2-Indanone oxime =

Names
- IUPAC name N-(1,3-dihydroinden-2-ylidene)hydroxylamine

Identifiers
CAS Number	3349-63-1
3D model (JSmol)	Interactive image
ChEBI	CHEBI:34291
ChemSpider	69326
ECHA InfoCard	100.020.097
EC Number	222-105-2
KEGG	C14639
PubChem CID	76875
UNII	9OUM5TX75K
CompTox Dashboard (EPA)	DTXSID4062987
- InChI: InChI=1S/C9H9NO/c11-10-9-5-7-3-1-2-4-8(7)6-9/h1-4,11H,5-6H2 Key: UJLFLOAXKVGYIA-UHFFFAOYSA-N; InChI=1S/C9H9NO/c11-10-9-5-7-3-1-2-4-8(7)6-9/h1-4,11H,5-6H2 Key: UJLFLOAXKVGYIA-UHFFFAOYSA-N
- SMILES: C1C(=NO)CC2=CC=CC=C21

Properties
Chemical formula	C_{9}H_{9}NO
Molar mass	147.177 g·mol^{−1}
Melting point	152–154 °C (306–309 °F; 425–427 K)
- Except where otherwise noted, data are given for materials in their standard state (at 25 °C [77 °F], 100 kPa). Infobox references

2-Indanone oxime is a bicyclic nitrogen-containing organic compound that is an indane derivative where the carbonyl oxygen of the parent ketone at the second carbon atom has been replaced by an oxime; this agent is used as a precursor for 2-aminoindanes.

== Use ==
=== Synthesis of 2-aminoindanes ===
The reaction proceeds via the sequential reduction of the oxime group (C=N−OH) to a free amino group (NH2). A key challenge in classic oxime hydrogenation is the occurrence of side reactions. By conducting catalytic hydrogenation of 2-indanone oxime with hydrogen at 20–70 psi at room temperature, using non-pyrophoric supported palladium in acetic acid or ethyl acetate in the presence of sulfuric acid—which blocks side reactions through in situ salt formation—a selective yield of the target hydrochloride.
