= Indenolol =

Names
- IUPAC name 1-(1H-Inden-4-yloxy)-3-(propan-2-ylamino)propan-2-ol

Identifiers
CAS Number	60607-68-3
3D model (JSmol)	Interactive image
ChEMBL	ChEMBL153585
ChemSpider	64962
DrugBank	DB08952
EC Number	262-323-5
KEGG	D08078
PubChem CID	71955
UNII	3MZM7RWW00
CompTox Dashboard (EPA)	DTXSID70866817
- InChI: InChI=1S/C15H21NO2/c1-11(2)16-9-13(17)10-18-15-8-4-6-12-5-3-7-14(12)15/h3-4,6-8,11,13,16-17H,5,9-10H2,1-2H3 Key: MPGBPFMOOXKQRX-UHFFFAOYSA-N; InChI=1/C15H21NO2/c1-11(2)16-9-13(17)10-18-15-8-4-6-12-5-3-7-14(12)15/h3-4,6-8,11,13,16-17H,5,9-10H2,1-2H3 Key: MPGBPFMOOXKQRX-UHFFFAOYAY
- SMILES: CC(C)NCC(COC1=CC=CC2=C1C=CC2)O

Properties
Chemical formula	C_{15}H_{21}NO_{2}
Molar mass	247.338 g·mol^{−1}
- Except where otherwise noted, data are given for materials in their standard state (at 25 °C [77 °F], 100 kPa). Infobox references

Indenolol is a beta-adrenergic blocker for the treatment of hypertension (high blood pressure). It was investigated in the 1980s, but is not known to be marketed as of 2021. It is a derivative of a phenolic 4-indenol.
