= Inherent chirality =

Asymmetry in molecules

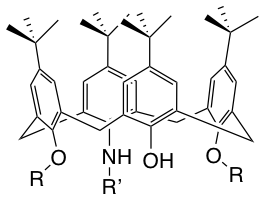
Inherently chiral calixarene with XXYZ substitution pattern.

In chemistry, inherent chirality is a property of asymmetry in molecules arising, not from a stereogenic or chiral center, but from a twisting of the molecule in 3D space. The term was coined by Volker Boehmer in a 1994 review, to describe the chirality of calixarenes arising from their non-planar structure in 3D space.

This phenomenon was described as resulting from "the absence of a place of symmetry or an inversion center in the molecule as a whole". Boehmer further explains this phenomenon by suggesting that if an inherently chiral calixarene macrocycle were opened up it would produce an "achiral linear molecule". There are two commonly used notations to describe a molecules inherent chirality: cR/cS (arising from the notation used for classically chiral compounds, with c denoting curvature) and P/M. Inherently chiral molecules, like their classically chiral counterparts, can be used in chiral host–guest chemistry, enantioselective synthesis, and other applications. There are naturally occurring inherently chiral molecules as well. Retinal, a chromophore in rhodopsin. exists in solution as a racemic pair of enantiomers due to the curvature of an achiral polyene chain.

== History ==
=== Calixarenes ===
After creating a series of traditionally chiral calixarenes (through the addition of a chiral substituent group on the top or bottom rim of the macrocycle), the first inherently chiral calixarenes were synthesized in 1982, though the molecules were not yet described as such. The inherently chiral calixarenes featured an XXYZ or WXYZ substitution pattern, such that the planar representation of the molecule does not show any chirality, and if the macrocycle were to be broken open, this would produce an achiral linear molecule. The chirality in these calixarenes is instead derived from the curvature of the molecule in space.

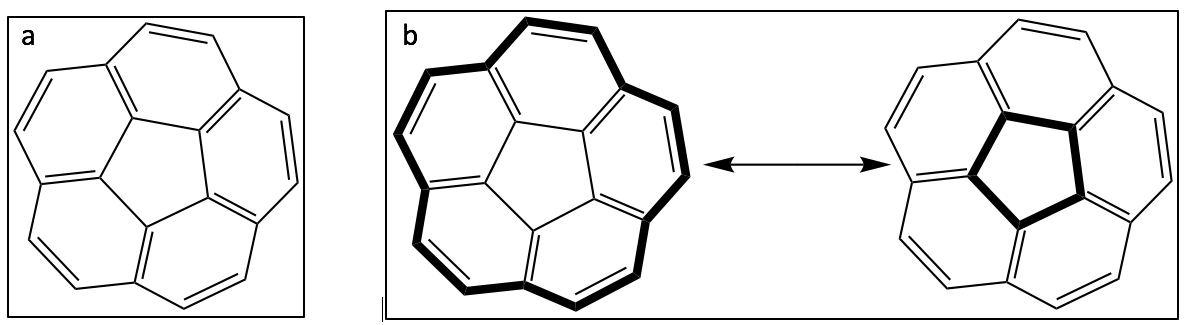
a) 2D representation of corannulene, b) 3D representation of corannulene bowl flip with C5 symmetry.

=== Definition ===
Due to the initial lack of a formal definition after the initial conception, the term inherent chirality was utilized to describe a variety of chiral molecules that don't fall into other defined chirality types. The first fully formulated definition of inherent chirality was published in 2004 by Mandolini and Schiaffino, (and later modified by Szumna):

inherent chirality arises from the introduction of a curvature in an ideal planar structure that is devoid of perpendicular symmetry planes in its bidimensional representation.

Inherent chirality has been known by a variety of names in the literature including bowl chirality (in fullerene fragments), intrinsic chirality, helicity (see section 3a) residual enantiomers (as applied to sterically hindered molecular propellers,) and cyclochirality (though this is often considered to be a more specific example and cannot be applied to all inherently chiral molecules).

A simple example of inherent chirality is that of corannulene commonly referred to as "bowl chirality" in the literature. The chirality of an unsubstituted corranulene (containing no classic stereogenic centers) cannot be seen in a 2D representation, but becomes clear when a 3D representation is evoked, as the C_{5} symmetry of corranulenes provides the molecules with a source of chirality (figure 2.) Racemization of these molecules is possible through an inversion of curvature, though some inherently chiral molecules have inversion barriers comparable to a classic chiral center.

== Molecular symmetry ==
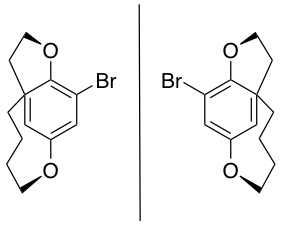
Inherently chiral paracyclophane, rendered chiral by the bromide substituent hindering rotation of the phenylene.

=== Chiral plane ===
Some inherently chiral molecules contain chirality planes, or planes within a given molecules across which the molecule is dissymmetric. Paracyclophanes often contain chiral planes if the bridge across the phenylene unit is short enough, or if the phenylene contains another substituent, not in the bridge, that hinders rotation of the phenylene unit.

=== Chiral axis ===
Similar to chirality planes, chirality axes arise from an axis about which the spatial arrangement of substituents creates chirality. This can be seen in helical molecules (see section 3a) as well as some alkenes.

== Other examples ==
Spiro compounds (compounds with a twisted structure of two or more rings) can have inherent chirality at the spiroatom, due to the twisting of the achiral ring system.

Inherently chiral alkenes have been synthesized through the use of a "buckle" where in an achiral, linear alkene is forced into a chiral conformation. Alkenes have no classical chirality, so generally, an external stereogenic center must be introduced. However, by locking the alkene into a conformation through the use of an achiral buckle allows for the creation of an inherently chiral alkene. Inherently chiral alkenes have been synthesized through the use of dialkoxysilanes, with a large enough racemization barrier that enantiomers have been isolated.

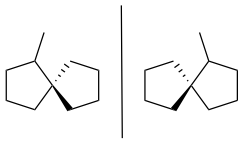
Chiral spiro ring system.

== See also ==
- Chirality (chemistry)
- Planar chirality
- Axial chirality
