= Acrylophenone =

Names
- Preferred IUPAC name 1-Phenylprop-2-en-1-one
- Other names Acrylophenone; Phenylvinyl ketone

Identifiers
CAS Number	768-03-6
3D model (JSmol)	Interactive image
ChemSpider	12486
ECHA InfoCard	100.011.082
PubChem CID	13028
UNII	O4QWF7V5AA
CompTox Dashboard (EPA)	DTXSID30227607
- InChI: InChI=1S/C9H8O/c1-2-9(10)8-6-4-3-5-7-8/h2-7H,1H2 Key: KUIZKZHDMPERHR-UHFFFAOYSA-N; InChI=1/C9H8O/c1-2-9(10)8-6-4-3-5-7-8/h2-7H,1H2 Key: KUIZKZHDMPERHR-UHFFFAOYAP
- SMILES: C=CC(=O)C1=CC=CC=C1

Properties
Chemical formula	C_{9}H_{8}O
Molar mass	132.162 g·mol^{−1}
Density	0.996 g/cm^{3}
Boiling point	115 °C at 18 Torr
- Except where otherwise noted, data are given for materials in their standard state (at 25 °C [77 °F], 100 kPa). Infobox references

Acrylophenone is an organic compound with the formula C_{9}H_{8}O. It is prepared using acetophenone, formaldehyde, and an amine hydrochloride in a Mannich reaction. It can be polymerized to poly(phenylvinyl ketone) via radical or anionic mechanisms. It is sometimes used as a comonomer in the manufacturing of certain resins.
