= Indanol =

1-Indanol
4-Indanol
2-Indanol
5-Indanol

Identifiers
CAS Number	1: 6351-10-6 racemic; 2: 4254-29-9; 4: 1641-41-4; 5: 1470-94-6
3D model (JSmol)	1: Interactive image; 2: Interactive image; 4: Interactive image; 5: Interactive image
Beilstein Reference	1:2042960,
ChEBI	1: CHEBI:16697; 5: CHEBI:59311
ChEMBL	1: ChEMBL4564909; 5: ChEMBL3218378
ChemSpider	1: 21394; 2: 70326; 4: 66840; 5: 14390
EC Number	1: 228-755-3; 2: 224-230-8; 4: 216-691-9; 5: 216-006-3
KEGG	1: C01710
PubChem CID	1: 22819; 2: 77936; 4: 74233; 5: 15118
UNII	1: LHG5BD7LOR; 2: B77NA7SM29; 4: 7PJT17BE05; 5: 9Z94H6F15T
CompTox Dashboard (EPA)	4: DTXSID00167708; 5: DTXSID0051732
- InChI: 1: InChI=1S/C9H10O/c10-9-6-5-7-3-1-2-4-8(7)9/h1-4,9-10H,5-6H2 Key: YIAPLDFPUUJILH-UHFFFAOYSA-N; 2: InChI=1S/C9H10O/c10-9-5-7-3-1-2-4-8(7)6-9/h1-4,9-10H,5-6H2 Key: KMGCKSAIIHOKCX-UHFFFAOYSA-N; 4: InChI=1S/C9H10O/c10-9-6-2-4-7-3-1-5-8(7)9/h2,4,6,10H,1,3,5H2 Key: DPHNJPUOMLRELT-UHFFFAOYSA-N; 5: InChI=1S/C9H10O/c10-9-5-4-7-2-1-3-8(7)6-9/h4-6,10H,1-3H2 Key: PEHSSTUGJUBZBI-UHFFFAOYSA-N
- SMILES: 1: OC1CCc2ccccc21; 2: OC1Cc2ccccc2C1; 4: Oc1cccc2c1CCC2; 5: Oc1ccc2c(c1)CCC2

Properties
Chemical formula	C_{9}H_{10}O
Molar mass	134.178 g·mol^{−1}
- Except where otherwise noted, data are given for materials in their standard state (at 25 °C [77 °F], 100 kPa). Infobox references

Indanols are a class of organic compounds, some of which are useful in medicine or industry. They are hydroxy derivatives of the parent compound called indane (also known as indan).

== Isomers ==
1-indanol (racemic), m.p. 54.8; R enantiomer, m.p. 67-68°C

2-indanol, m.p. 68-69 °C

4-indanol, m.p. 42 °C

5-indanol, m.p. 58 °C

Five isomers are possible, two of which are phenols (4- and 5-indanols). Three isomers feature hydroxyl group on the five-membered ring, including an enantiomeric pair of 1-indanol. 1-Indanol can be produced by reduction of 1-indanone. 5-indanol can be prepared by sulfonation of indane, following by base cleavage of the indane-5-sulfonate.
