= Corannulene =

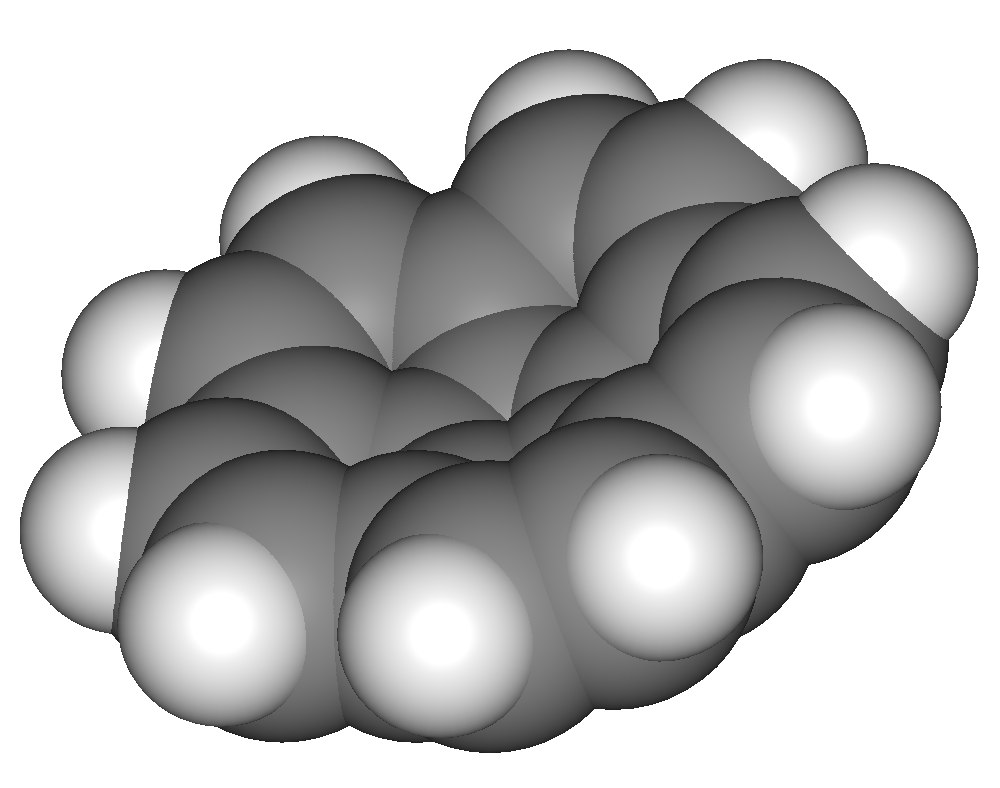

Names
- IUPAC name Dibenzo[ghi,mno]fluoranthene
- Other names [5]circulene; Buckybowl

Identifiers
CAS Number	5821-51-2
3D model (JSmol)	Interactive image; Interactive image
ChemSpider	10006487
PubChem CID	11831840
UNII	KFD2X7NT86
CompTox Dashboard (EPA)	DTXSID80474164
- InChI: InChI=1S/C20H10/c1-2-12-5-6-14-9-10-15-8-7-13-4-3-11(1)16-17(12)19(14)20(15)18(13)16/h1-10H Key: VXRUJZQPKRBJKH-UHFFFAOYSA-N; InChI=1/C20H10/c1-2-12-5-6-14-9-10-15-8-7-13-4-3-11(1)16-17(12)19(14)20(15)18(13)16/h1-10H Key: VXRUJZQPKRBJKH-UHFFFAOYAF
- SMILES: c16ccc2ccc3ccc5c4c(c1c2c34)c(cc5)cc6; C1=CC2=CC=C3C=CC4=C5C6=C(C2=C35)C1=CC=C6C=C4

Properties
Chemical formula	C_{20}H_{10}
Molar mass	250.29 g/mol
- Except where otherwise noted, data are given for materials in their standard state (at 25 °C [77 °F], 100 kPa). verify (what is ?) Infobox references

Corannulene is a polycyclic aromatic hydrocarbon with chemical formula C_{20}H_{10}. The molecule consists of a cyclopentane ring fused with 5 benzene rings, so another name for it is [5]circulene. It is of scientific interest because it is a geodesic polyarene and can be considered a fragment of buckminsterfullerene. Due to this connection and also its bowl shape, corannulene is also known as a buckybowl. Buckybowls are fragments of buckyballs. Corannulene exhibits a bowl-to-bowl inversion with an inversion barrier of 10.2 kcal/mol (42.7 kJ/mol) at −64 °C.

== Synthesis ==
Several synthetic routes exist to corannulene. Flash vacuum pyrolysis techniques generally have lower chemical yields than solution-chemistry syntheses, but offer routes to more derivatives. Corannulene was first isolated in 1966 by multistep organic synthesis. In 1971, the synthesis and properties of corannulane were reported. A flash vacuum pyrolysis method followed in 1991. One synthesis based on solution chemistry consists of a nucleophilic displacement–elimination reaction of an octabromide with sodium hydroxide:

The bromine substituents are removed with an excess of n-butyllithium.

A kilogram scale synthesis of corannulene has been achieved.

Much effort is directed at functionalization of the corannulene ring with novel functional groups such as ethynyl groups, ether groups, thioether groups, platinum functional groups, aryl groups, phenalenyl and indeno extensions, and ferrocene groups.

== Aromaticity ==
The observed aromaticity for this compound is explained with a so-called annulene-within-an-annulene model. According to this model corannulene is made up of an aromatic 6 electron cyclopentadienyl anion surrounded by an aromatic 14 electron annulenyl cation. This model was suggested by Barth and Lawton in the first synthesis of corannulene in 1966. They also suggested the trivial name 'corannulene', which is derived from the annulene-within-an-annulene model: core + annulene.

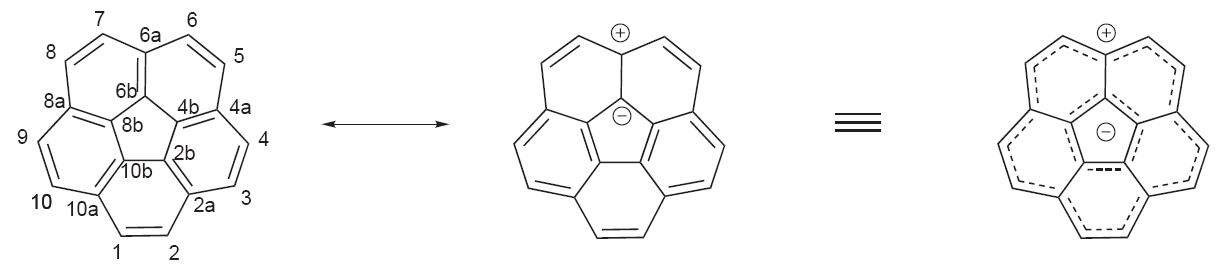

However, later theoretical calculations have disputed the validity of this approximation.

== Reactions ==
=== Reduction ===
Corannulene can be reduced up to a tetraanion in a series of one-electron reductions. This has been performed with alkali metals, electrochemically and with bases. The corannulene dianion is antiaromatic and tetraanion is again aromatic. With lithium as reducing agent two tetraanions form a supramolecular dimer with two bowls stacked into each other with 4 lithium ions in between and 2 pairs above and below the stack. This self-assembly motif was applied in the organization of fullerenes. Penta-substituted fullerenes (with methyl or phenyl groups) charged with five electrons form supramolecular dimers with a complementary corannulene tetraanion bowl, 'stitched' by interstitial lithium cations. In a related system, 5 lithium ions are sandwiched between two corannulene bowls.

In one cyclopenta[bc]corannulene a concave - concave aggregate is observed by NMR spectroscopy with 2 C–Li–C bonds connecting the tetraanions.

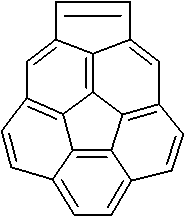
Cyclopenta[bc]corannulene

Metals tend to bind to the convex face of the annulene. Concave binding has been reported for a caesium/crown ether system.

=== Photochemistry ===
UV 193-nm photoionization effectively removes a π-electron from the twofold degenerate E_{1}-HOMO located in the aromatic network of electrons yielding a corannulene radical cation. Owing to the degeneracy in the HOMO orbital, the corannulene radical cation is unstable in its original C_{5v} molecular arrangement, and therefore, subject to Jahn-Teller (JT) vibronic distortion.

Using electrospray ionization, a protonated corannulene cation has been produced in which the protonation site was observed to be on a peripheral sp^{2}-carbon atom.

=== Reaction with electrophiles ===
Corannulene can react with electrophiles to form a corannulene carbocation. Reaction with chloromethane and aluminium chloride results in the formation of an AlCl_{4}^{−} salt with a methyl group situated at the center with the cationic center at the rim. X-ray diffraction analysis shows that the new carbon-carbon bond is elongated (157 pm).

=== Carbonization ===
Corannulene can be carbonized to form carbon materials with pentagons and SOLO, which includes one C-H group in one benzene ring. Since corannulene is symmetrical, carbon materials with controlled structures can be prepared.

== Bicorannulenyl ==
Bicorannulenyl is the product of dehydrogenative coupling of corannulene. With the formula C_{20}H_{9}-C_{20}H_{9}, it consists of two corannulene units connected through a single C-C bond. The molecule's stereochemistry consists of two chiral elements: the asymmetry of a singly substituted corannulenyl, and the helical twist about the central bond. In the neutral state, bicorannulenyl exists as 12 conformers, which interconvert through multiple bowl-inversions and bond-rotations. When bicorannulenyl is reduced to a dianion with potassium metal, the central bond assumes significant double-bond character. This change is attributed to the orbital structure, which has a LUMO orbital localized on the central bond. When bicorannulenyl is reduced to an octaanion with lithium metal, it self-assembles into supramolecular oligomers. This motif illustrates "charged polyarene stacking".

== Research ==
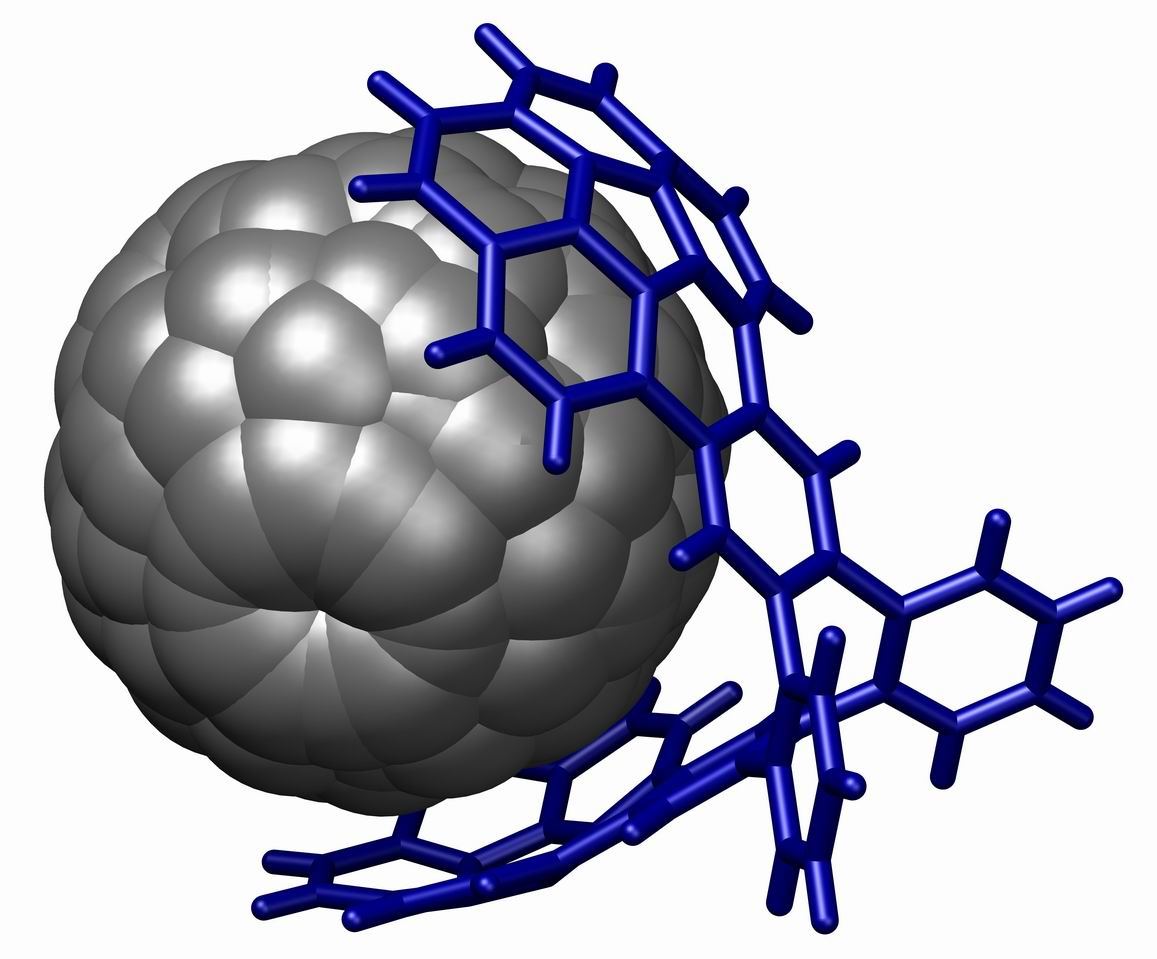
The buckycatcher

The corannulene group is used in host–guest chemistry with interactions based on pi stacking, notably with fullerenes (the buckycatcher) but also with nitrobenzene.

Alkyl-substituted corannulenes form a thermotropic hexagonal columnar liquid crystalline mesophase. Corannulene has also been used as the core group in a dendrimer. Like other PAHs, corannulene ligates metals. Corannulenes with ethynyl groups are investigated for their potential use as blue emitters. The structure was analyzed by infrared spectroscopy, Raman spectroscopy, and X-ray photoelectron spectroscopy.

== See also ==
- Coronene
- Geodesic polyarene
- Helicene
- Sumanene
