= Hydrindane =

Names
- IUPAC name 2,3,3a,4,5,6,7,7a-octahydro-1H-indene
- Other names octahydroindene, hexahydroindane, bicyclo[4.3.0]nonane

Identifiers
CAS Number	496-10-6
3D model (JSmol)	Interactive image
Beilstein Reference	2321743
ChEBI	CHEBI:49301
ChemSpider	9902
ECHA InfoCard	100.007.104
EC Number	207-813-1
PubChem CID	10325
UNII	W965AA6ND6
CompTox Dashboard (EPA)	DTXSID40870562
- InChI: InChI=1S/C9H16/c1-2-5-9-7-3-6-8(9)4-1/h8-9H,1-7H2 Key: BNRNAKTVFSZAFA-UHFFFAOYSA-N
- SMILES: C1CCC2CCCC2C1

Properties
Chemical formula	C_{9}H_{16}
Molar mass	124.227 g·mol^{−1}
Density	0.90732 g/cm^{3}
Melting point	−53 °C (−63 °F; 220 K)
Boiling point	165.5–167.5 °C (329.9–333.5 °F; 438.6–440.6 K)

Hazards
- GHS labelling
Pictograms	(GHS02: Flammable) (GHS07: Exclamation mark)
Signal word	Warning
Hazard statements	H226, H302, H413
Precautionary statements	P210, P233, P240, P241, P242, P243, P264, P270, P273, P280, P301+P317, P303+P361+P353, P330, P370+P378, P403+P235, P501
- Except where otherwise noted, data are given for materials in their standard state (at 25 °C [77 °F], 100 kPa). Infobox references

Hydrindane is an organic compound with the formula C_{9}H_{16}. A bicyclic molecule, it is the hydrogenated derivative of the more common hydrocarbons indane and indene. Isomers of hydrindane include the compound with cis-fused rings and the chiral trans-fused derivative.

== Occurrence ==
Lanostane, one of many steroids with a hydrindane core.

Hydrindane is a component of diesel fuels produced by hydrocracking. Hydrindane is a subunit of many steroids.
