= Indane =

- Skeletal formula

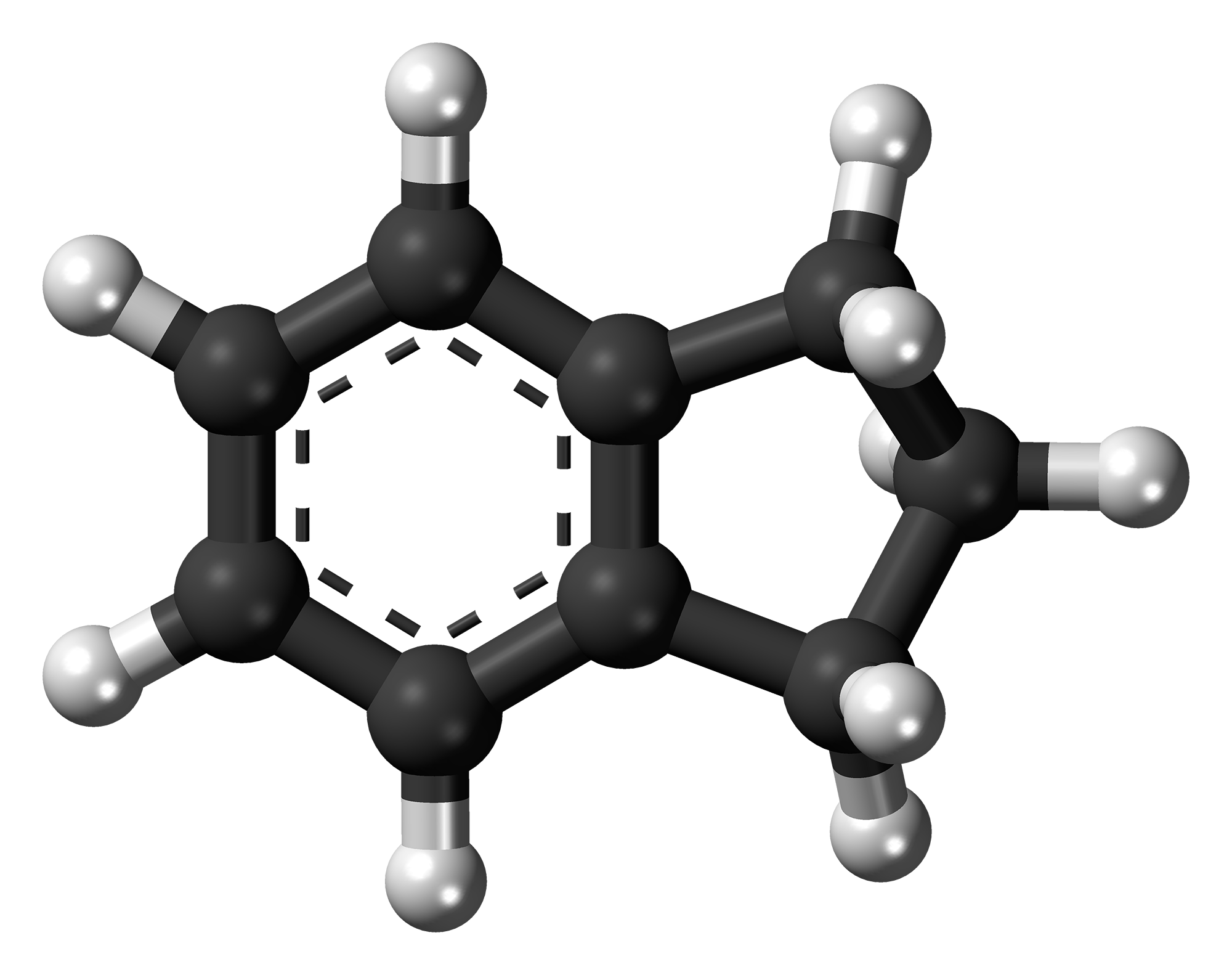

Names
- Preferred IUPAC name 2,3-Dihydro-1H-indene
- Other names Indan; Benzocyclopentane; Hydrindene; 2,3-Dihydroindene

Identifiers
CAS Number	496-11-7
3D model (JSmol)	Interactive image
Beilstein Reference	1904376
ChEBI	CHEBI:37911
ChEMBL	ChEMBL370687
ChemSpider	9903
ECHA InfoCard	100.007.105
Gmelin Reference	67817
PubChem CID	10326
UNII	H9SCX043IG
CompTox Dashboard (EPA)	DTXSID4052132
- InChI: InChI=1S/C9H10/c1-2-5-9-7-3-6-8(9)4-1/h1-2,4-5H,3,6-7H2 Key: PQNFLJBBNBOBRQ-UHFFFAOYSA-N; InChI=1/C9H10/c1-2-5-9-7-3-6-8(9)4-1/h1-2,4-5H,3,6-7H2 Key: PQNFLJBBNBOBRQ-UHFFFAOYAW
- SMILES: c1ccc2c(c1)CCC2

Properties
Chemical formula	C_{9}H_{10}
Molar mass	118.176 g/mol
Appearance	colorless liquid
Density	0.9645 g/cm^{3}
Melting point	−51.4 °C (−60.5 °F; 221.8 K)
Boiling point	176.5 °C (349.7 °F; 449.6 K)
- Except where otherwise noted, data are given for materials in their standard state (at 25 °C [77 °F], 100 kPa). verify (what is ?) Infobox references

Indane or indan is an organic compound with the formula C_{9}H_{10}. It is a colorless liquid hydrocarbon. It is a petrochemical, a bicyclic compound. It occurs at the level of about 0.1% in coal tar. Many modified indanes are known.

== Production of indane skeleton ==
Indane itself is usually produced by hydrogenation of indene. More complex indanes are produced by cyclization of phenylpropionic acid and related compounds under Friedel-Crafts reaction conditions. Such routes afford 1-indanone, which can be reduced to indanol or the indane. 2-Bromoaryl derivatives with unsaturated substituents undergo Heck reactions (palladium-catalyzed) involving formal loss of HBr and cyclization to indanes and indenes. Enantioselective routes to chiral indanes and indenes are also available. Routes to the hydroindanes are also relevant.

== Derivatives ==
Derivatives include 1- and 2-methylindanes (where a methyl group is attached to the five carbon ring) as well as 4- and 5-methylindanes (where a methyl group is attached to the benzene ring). Various dimethylindanes are known. 1,1,3,3-Tetramethylindane is produced commercially.

Many indanes can be prepared by reactions of indane with electrophiles, which attack the 5-position (on the benzene ring). For example, sulfonation gives indane-5-sulfonic acid. Base hydrolysis of which gives 5-indanol.

A family of indane derivatives are empathogen-entactogens. They are very close derivatives of other empathogen-entactogens such as MDMA and MDA. Examples include MDAI and MDMAI. Other derivatives include 2-aminoindane, NM-2-AI and the 5-iodo derivative 5-IAI.

Indinavir for treatment of HIV/AIDS

Rasagiline for treatment of Parkinson's disease

Ramelteon for treatment of insomnia

5-APDI (c.f. 5-MAPDI)

5,6-methylenedioxy-2-aminoindane, a recreational drug related to MDMA

Indane can be used to prepare 5-propionylindane [63998-49-2]. Nitration of indane gives 4-nitroindane. Reduction of the nitro group then gives 4-aminoindane. This compound finds use in the synthesis of an agent that is called Indanazoline [40507-78-6]. Another compound that is made from indane proper is called Sulofenur (LY181984) [110311-27-8]. Glyhexamide [451-71-8] is another example of such a compound prepared from indane starting material. Glidazamide [3074-35-9] is a further example of sulfonyl urea prepared from indaneGlyhexamide and glidazamide are typical sulfonylurea antidiabetics (hypoglycemics), whereas Sulofenur has anticarcinogenic properties.

Hydrogenation of indane gives the saturated derivative hydrindane.

== See also ==
- Indene
- 1,3-Indanedione, a popular starting compound
