= 1-Indanone =

Names
- Preferred IUPAC name 2,3-Dihydro-1H-inden-1-one
- Other names α-Hydroindone

Identifiers
| CAS Number | 83-33-0 |
| 3D model (JSmol) | Interactive image |
| Beilstein Reference | 507957 |
| ChEBI | CHEBI:17404 |
| ChemSpider | 6479 |
| ECHA InfoCard | 100.001.337 |
| EC Number | 201-470-1 |
| Gmelin Reference | 142414 |
| KEGG | C01504 |
| PubChem CID | 6735 |
| UNII | V7021Y717I |
| CompTox Dashboard (EPA) | DTXSID1058892 |
- InChI: InChI=1S/C9H8O/c10-9-6-5-7-3-1-2-4-8(7)9/h1-4H,5-6H2 Key: QNXSIUBBGPHDDE-UHFFFAOYSA-N
- SMILES: C1CC(=O)C2=CC=CC=C21

Properties
| Chemical formula | C_{9}H_{8}O |
| Molar mass | 132.162 g·mol^{−1} |
| Appearance | Colorless solid |
| Melting point | 38–42 °C (100–108 °F; 311–315 K) |
| Boiling point | 243–245 °C (469–473 °F; 516–518 K) |

Hazards
- GHS labelling
| Pictograms | (GHS07: Exclamation mark) |
| Signal word | Warning |
| Hazard statements | H302 |
| Precautionary statements | P261, P264, P270, P271, P280, P301+P312, P302+P352, P304+P340, P305+P351+P338, P312, P321, P330, P332+P313, P337+P313, P362, P403+P233, P405, P501 |
- Except where otherwise noted, data are given for materials in their standard state (at 25 °C [77 °F], 100 kPa). Infobox references

1-Indanone is the organic compound with the formula C_{6}H_{4}(CH_{2})_{2}CO. It is one of two isomeric benzocyclopentanones, the other being 2-indanone. It is a colorless solid. 1-Indanone is a substrate for the enzyme indanol dehydrogenase.

== Preparation ==
It is prepared by oxidation of indane or indene. It can also be prepared by cyclization of phenylpropionic acid.

== Uses and reactions ==
1-Indanone is an intermediate in the synthesis of a variety of pharmaceutical drugs including 2-aminoindane (using beta-keto-oxime formation with isoamylnitrite followed by reduction), drinidene, pirandamine, pyrophendane & rasagiline.

1-Indanol can be produced by hydride reduction of 1-indanone.
