= Department of Materials, Imperial College London =

Material science department in London, England

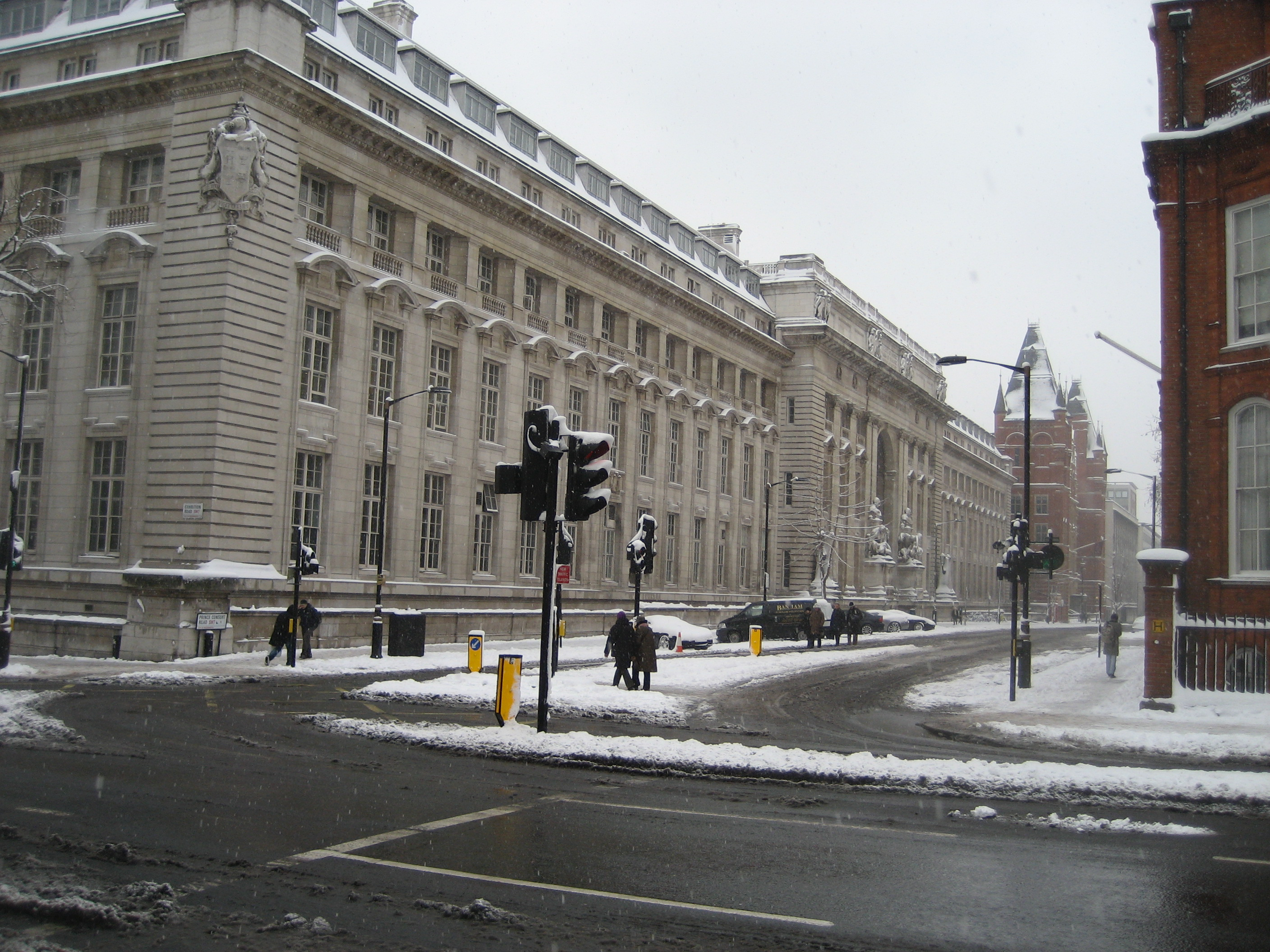
- Goldsmiths Extension, Royal School of Mines
- Established: 1851; 175 years ago
- Head of Department: Professor Sandrine Heutz
- Faculty: Imperial College Faculty of Engineering
- Staff: 165
- Students: 665
- Location: London, United Kingdom; 51.4997°N 0.1754°W
- Campus: South Kensington
- Former Names: Department of Metallurgy (1851); Department of Metallurgy and Materials Science (1970)
- Website: www.imperial.ac.uk/materials

Map
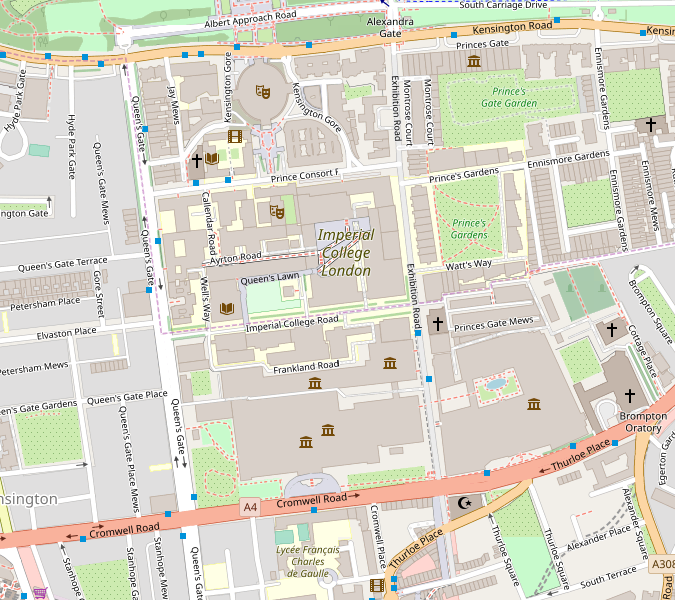
- Location within Albertopolis, South Kensington

The Department of Materials is an academic department of the Faculty of Engineering at Imperial College London in England, United Kingdom.

It is located at the Royal School of Mines and Bessemer buildings on the South Kensington campus. It can trace its origins back to the metallurgy department of the Government School of Mines and Science applied to the Arts, founded in 1851.

== History ==
The department was founded as the metallurgy department of the Government School of Mines and Science Applied to the Arts, founded in 1851, under the leadership of John Percy. He resigned nine years later, when the school was moved to the Huxley building along Exhibition Road. The next department head was not appointed until 1880, when William Chandler Roberts-Austen took on the role. William Gowland was appointed head in 1902, staying on to become head of the department after the formation of Imperial College in 1907. The department moved to the newly completed Bessemer building in 1912.

In 1926, a common set of exams was created for the awarding of both the Associateship of the Royal School of Mines and the Bachelor of Science from the University of London, prior to which students were required to sit separate after three years of study. In 1939, World War II lead the department's evacuation to Swansea, during which time it was partly integrated with University College, Swansea.

In the 1960s, the department expanded beyond metals, organising new inter-departmental courses on materials science and technology. This led to the establishment in the 1970s of two separate courses, a BScEng course in metallurgy, and a BSc course in materials science, and the renaming of the department to the Department of Metallurgy and Materials Science. The Bessemer building was rebuilt finishing in 1964, as part of a college wide rebuilding scheme. In 1991, the number of courses offered was greatly expanded, including the introduction of integrated master's and specialised degrees.

In 2002, the department installed an aberration-corrected analytical transmission electron microscope. Kilner, Atkinson, and colleagues from Imperial including Brandon, developed low temperature solid oxide fuel cells and formed the spin out Ceres Power. Haynes and Mostofi have developed the ONETEP density functional theory code, for which Haynes was awarded the Maxwell medal in 2010. In 2018 Breeze, Alford and colleagues developed the first continuous room temperature maser.

== Facilities ==
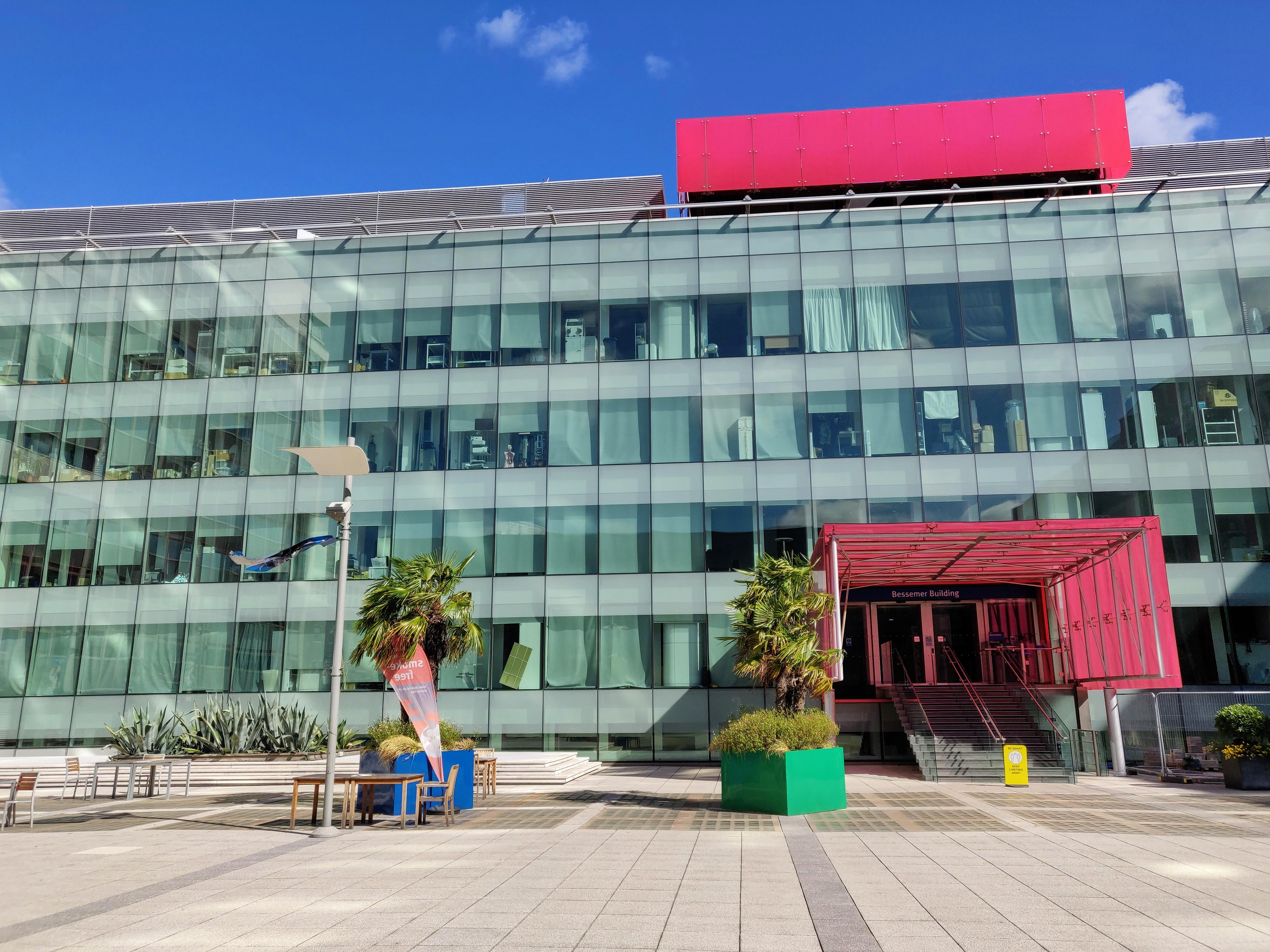
The department shares the Bessemer Building with the Department of Bioengineering

The department has a variety of labs and facilities in the Royal School of Mines and Bessemer buildings. These include the Harvey Flower Electron Microscopy Facility, the x-ray analysis lab, the thin film laboratory, surface analysis, the high temperature ceramics facilities (as part of the Centre for Advanced Structural Ceramics), and the near atmosphere x-ray photo-electron spectroscopy lab.

== Academics ==
=== Study ===
==== Undergraduate ====
The undergraduate program at the department includes 4-year integrated course leading to an MEng degree in Materials Science and Engineering, and a 3-year course leading to a BEng degree in Materials Science and Engineering. There is also the option of a specialist stream in nuclear engineering (delivered jointly with the departments of chemical and mechanical engineering). All students graduating with the MEng degree also automatically receive an Associateship of the Royal School of Mines, ARSM.

==== Postgraduate ====
The department has a large research portfolio and offers a PhD degree programme and two full-time taught MSc programmes. The PhD in Materials Science and Engineering is a 3-year research degree which involves conducting work in one of the department's research laboratories. All postgraduate students of the department are also eligible for the Diploma of Imperial College, DIC, alongside their standard degree when graduating.

== People ==
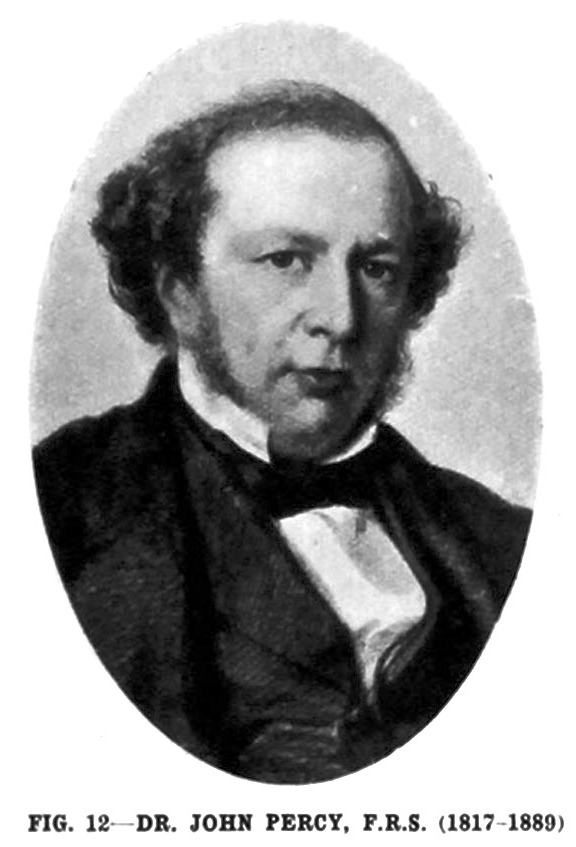
John Percy became the first head of the department in 1851

=== Heads of department ===
- John Percy, 1851–62
- William Chandler Roberts-Austen, 1880-1902
- William Gowland, 1902-09
- William Arthur Carlyle, 1909-13
- Sir Harold Carpenter, 1913-40
- C.W. Dannatt, 1940-57
- J.G. Ball, 1957-79
- D.W. Pashley, 1979-90
- Malcolm McLean, 1990-2000
- John Kilner, 2000-06
- Bill Lee FREng, 2006-10
- Niel Alford MBE FREng, 2010-2015
- Peter Haynes, 2015-2022
- Sandrine Heutz, 2022 - present

=== Notable faculty ===
- Fionn Dunne
- Robin Grimes
- Sandrine Heutz
- Mary Ryan
- Molly Stevens
- Natalie Stingelin

== Notable alumni ==
Notable alumni include:

- Sir Gilbert Thomas Walker, CSI, FRS (14 June 1867 – 4 November 1958), BEng Metallurgy 1925 ─ British physicist and statistician of the 20th century. He is best known for his ground breaking description of the Southern Oscillation, a major phenomenon of global climate, and for greatly advancing the study of the climate in general.
- Peter Harding (1919–2006), BEng Metallurgy 1947 ─ Metallurgist and captured WWII pilot
- Professor William Bonfield, CBE, FREng, FRS, Professor of Medical Materials, University of Cambridge, BSc Metallurgy 1958 & PhD 1961 ─ Internationally recognised for his pioneering contributions to biomaterials, and in particular bone prostheses.
- Professor Helen M. Chan – Materials Scientist at Lehigh University on the board of directors of the American Ceramic Society
- Professor Derek Fray, FREng, BEng Metallurgy 1961, PhD 1964 ─ The co-inventor of the FFC Cambridge process which is used to extra titanium metal from the oxide. He is the former Head of Department of the Materials Department at the University of Cambridge, and he spun out British Titanium plc and Metalysis.
- Professor Antony (Tony) Evans, FRS, FReng, BSc Metallurgy 1964, PhD 1967 ─ Authority on mechanical behaviour of brittle materials and composites, with key contributions in thermal barrier coating technology on superalloy turbine blades enabling increased operating temperatures and efficiencies for jet engines.
- Dr Amit Chatterjee, PhD Metallurgy 1970 ─ Former Chief technology officer and now adviser to the managing director of Tata Steel.
- Rajive Kaul, BEng Metallurgy 1974 ─ Chairman and managing director of Nicco Corp.
- Professor Dame Sue Ion, OBE, FREng, BEng Metallurgy and Materials Science 1976, and PhD 1979 ─ Previously executive Director of Technology of British Nuclear Fuel Limited. She is the UK representative of the International Atomic Energy Agency Standing Advisory Group on Nuclear Energy.
- Jessica Hsuan, BEng Materials 1992 ─ Chinese actress
- Samuel Hignett, BEng Materials 2001 ─ Founder and director of Jota Group, including Jota Motor Racing Team and Jota Airlines.
- Professor Eleanor Schofield, MEng and PhD Materials 2006 ─ Head of Conservation & Collections Care at the Mary Rose Trust.
- Bernard Henry, PhD 1993 ─ Associate Director of Research in Nanocomposites at the University of Oxford and elite athlete

== Annual Bauerman Lecture ==
In 2016, the department instituted an annual prize lecture to highlight advances in Materials Science and Engineering. The annual lecture is named in honour of Hilary Bauerman, one of the first 7 students to enter the Government School of Mines in 1851.

- 2016 - Professor Stephen Mann FRS "Systems of Creation: the Emergence of Life from Non-living Materials?"
- 2017 - Professor Sir Richard Friend FRS "Electronic Excitations in Molecular Semiconductors"
- 2018 - Professor Jennifer Lewis "Digital and Self-Assembly of Vascularized Organ-Specific Tissues"
- 2019 - Professor Dierk Raabe "Compositional Lattice Defect Manipulation for Microstructure Design"
- 2020 - Professor Nicola Spaldin "New Materials for a New Age"
- 2022 - Professor Professor Clare Grey FRS "New ways of looking at batteries - function, failure and fast charging"
- 2023 - Professor Professor Samuel Stupp "Frontiers in Supramolecular Design of Materials"

== See also ==
- Department of Materials, University of Oxford
- Department of Materials Science and Metallurgy, University of Cambridge
