= Gunin (disambiguation) =

Gunin is a 2022 Bangladeshi film.

Gunin may also refer to:

- Gunin Hazarika, Indian politician
- Gunin, Hindu ritual specialist, see Bonbibi
- Gunin language, see List of Australian Aboriginal languages
- Gunin (surname)

== See also ==
- Gunning
