= Bernard Henry =

Bernard Henry may refer to:

- Bernard Henry (American football) (born 1960), American former football wide receiver
- Bernard Henry (scientist) (1965–2007), British materials scientist
