= Serena Corr =

Irish chemist

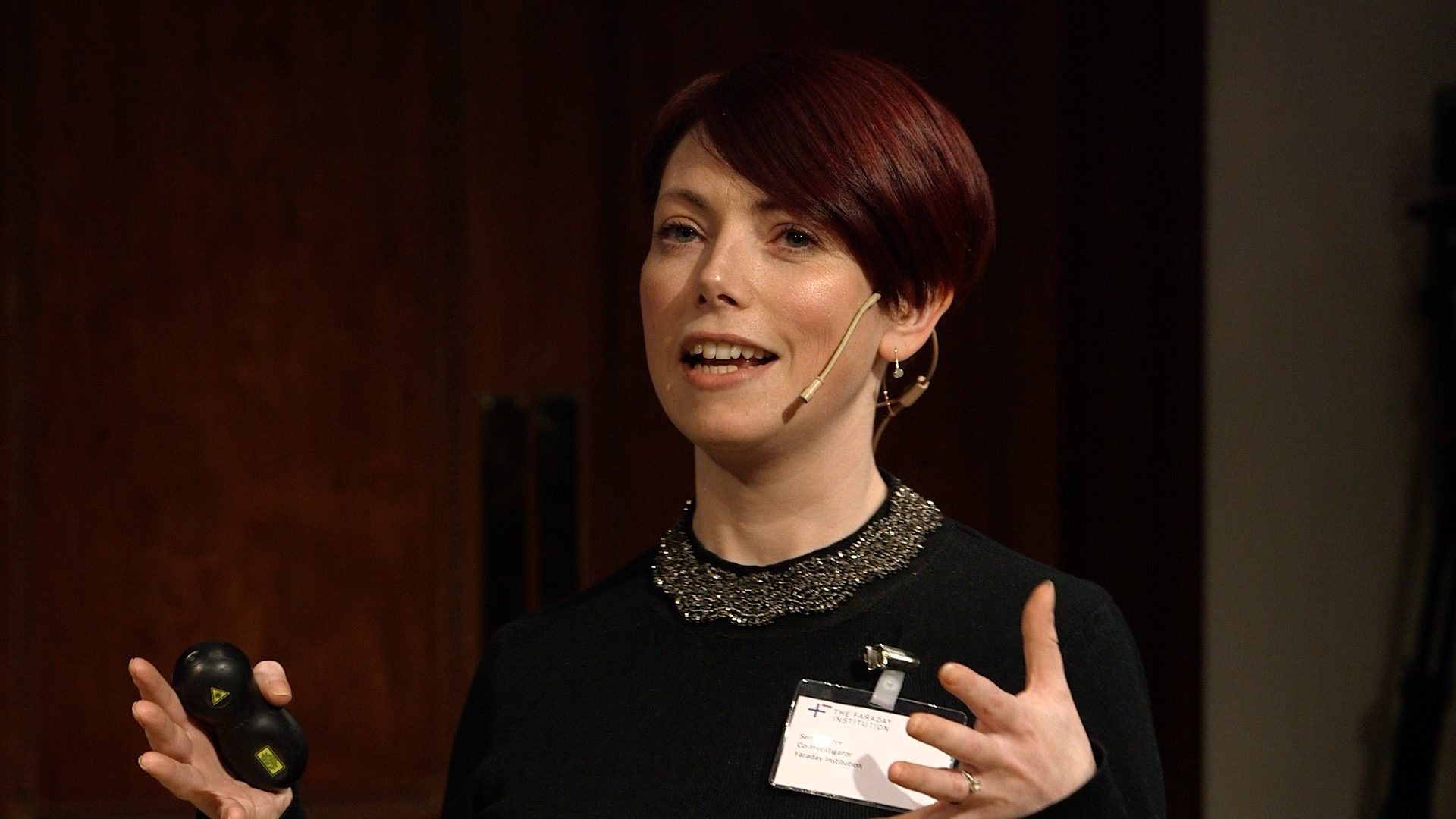
- Corr speaking at the Royal Institution in 2019
- Education: Trinity College Dublin
- Known for: Next generation battery materials
- Scientific career
- Workplaces: University College Dublin; University of Sheffield; University of Glasgow; University of Kent; University of California, Santa Barbara
- Thesis: New magnetic nanocomposite materials
- Doctoral advisor: Yurii Gun'ko

Serena Corr is Full Professor of Materials Chemistry at University College Dublin. Previous to this, she was chair in Functional Materials and Professor in Chemical and Biological Engineering at the University of Sheffield. She works on next-generation battery materials and advanced characterisation techniques for nanomaterials.

== Early life and education ==
Corr grew up in Clonmel and attended Presentation Secondary School. She studied chemistry at Trinity College Dublin. She completed her doctoral work on magnetic structured materials (nanoparticles and quantum dots for biomedical applications) with Yurii Gun'ko. She focussed on nanomaterials that could be used for biomedical applications. Corr worked on several outreach programs during her PhD. She joined the University of California, Santa Barbara, working with Ram Seshadri on vanadate metal-insulator transitions from 2007 to 2009. She worked on rutile vanadium oxide. They also explored molybdenum dioxide materials that demonstrated reversible lithium storage capacity.

As a student, Serena was heavily involved in the Maths Department in Trinity College Dublin, acting as a course administrator for Tim Murphy's 061 Practical Computing course.

== Career ==
Corr was made a lecturer at the University of Kent. She spent her first year writing papers and proposals for the Diamond Light Source and ISIS neutron source. Her early work considered ways to design nanostructured materials using organometallic precursors. She demonstrated that magnetic nanoparticles could be used as MRI contrast agents. She held a visiting professorship at the University of Otago.

Corr joined the University of Glasgow as a lecturer in 2013 and was made a professor in 2018. She took part in the science communication competition I'm a Scientist, Get me out of here!. In 2014 she collaborated with Eleanor Schofield to conserve the Mary Rose. She developed multi-functional magnetic nano-composites that could remove the iron ions within waterlogged wood.

In 2013 she edited a chapter for Nanomedicine, Magnetic Nanoparticles for Targeted Cancer Diagnosis and Therapy. Her group look at new insertion electrodes for energy storage. These were formed from nanoparticles, which house lithium ions that can be moved between the cathode and anode. She showed that shape and size of the nanoparticles can impact their electrochemical properties. She uses fast microwave processing and alkoxides for continuous chemical synthesis of next generation battery materials. In 2015 she was awarded a £1.2 million Engineering and Physical Sciences Research Council grant to investigate the reliability of these materials in devices. This involves studying the structure of electrodes and dynamics of ion movement. In 2017 she was made a Training Champion for the Faraday Institution, an academia – industry response to the Faraday Battery Challenge. Her research on battery longevity and how Lithium-ion batteries degrade was covered by The Daily Telegraph.

In 2017 Corr was selected as a Royal Society of Chemistry Journal of Materials Chemistry lecturer. She joined the University of Sheffield as a chair in Functional Materials and Professor in Chemical and Biological Engineering in 2018, serving as head of department. She serves on the management board of the Engineering and Physical Sciences Research Council doctoral training centre in energy storage. She is an associate editor of Royal Society of Chemistry journal Nanoscale and the IOP Publishing journal Progress in Energy. In 2019 she gave talks about the chemistry of batteries at the Royal Institution. In 2021 she gave evidence at House of Lords Science and Technology Select Committee for its inquiry into the role of batteries in achieving net zero.

In 2023 she was the winner of the Royal Society of Chemistry's Interdisciplinary Prize. In April 2024, she moved to University College Dublin as Professor of Materials Chemistry. She is a member of the scientific advisory board for the Max Planck Institute for Solid State Research.
