= Gunin (surname) =

Gunin (Russian: Гунин), feminine: Gunina is a Russian patronymic surname derived from the nickname "Gunya", "Gun", the noun derived from the archaic verb gunit (гунить) meaning to tell and other dialectal meanings. The nickname gave rise to a number of other surnames: Guneyev, Gunev, Gunkin, Gunkov, Gunyayev.The name may refer to the following notable people:

- Andrey Gunin (born 1965) Russian (Chuvash) doctor of medical sciences, professor
- Nikolay Gunin (1924–2011), Russian hockey and football coach
- Valentina Gunina (born 1989), Russian chess grandmaster

== See also ==
- Gunko
