= Gunev =

Gunev (geminine: Guneva) is a Slavic surname of multiple origins. As a Russian patronymic surname, it may be derived from the nickname "Gunya", "Gun", the noun derived from the archaic verb gunit (гунить) meaning to tell and other dialectal meanings. The nickname gave rise to a number of other surnames: Guneyev, Gunin, Gunkin, Gunkov, Gunyayev. Notable people withe the name include:

- Vasil Gunev, Macedonian footballer
- Desislav Gunev, Bulgarian track and field sprint athlete
