= Mary Ryan (materials scientist) =

British materials scientist

Mary Ryan CBE FREng
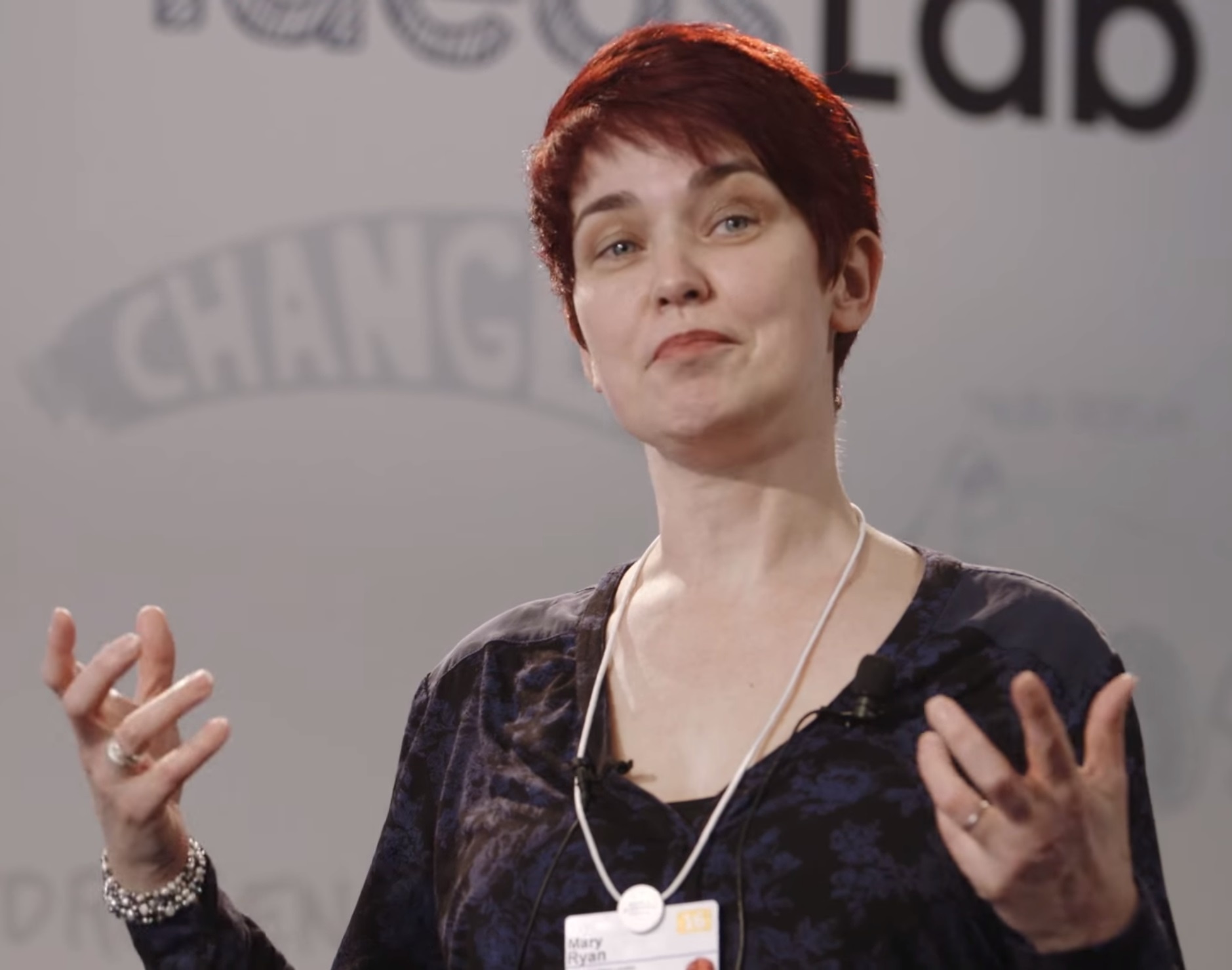
- Ryan speaks at the World Economic Forum in 2016
- Born: Mary Patricia Ryan
- Education: University of Manchester
- Known for: Nanoscience; Corrosion
- Scientific career
- Workplaces: Imperial College London; Brookhaven National Laboratory
- Doctoral students: Eleanor Schofield
- Website: imperial.ac.uk/people/m.p.ryan

Mary Patricia Ryan CBE FREng is a Professor of Materials Science at Imperial College London and a Fellow of the Royal Academy of Engineering.

== Education ==
Ryan completed her undergraduate and postgraduate studies at the University of Manchester. Her PhD was on using "in-situ ECSTM to study the formation of ultra-thin surface oxides on base metals", and she managed to show for the first time that these surface oxides have crystalline phases. She spent three years at Brookhaven National Laboratory, New York, where she developed in situ electrochemical systems using synchrotron radiation-based techniques.

== Career and research ==
Ryan is an expert in electrochemistry and interfacial material science. Ryan joined Imperial College London as a lecturer in 1998. Her research group explore the mechanism of corrosion, new protective materials and materials with thermal management capabilities. She studies the process of electrochemical deposition, the stabilities of metals and the formation processes of metal and oxide nanostructures. She pioneered the use of synchrotron X-rays to study reactive electrochemical systems, including the stability of nanostructures.

In 2002, she published the seminal paper "Why stainless steel corrodes" in Nature.

In 2012, she joined Amy Cruickshank to advise on how to preserve the Dornier Do 17 ('The Flying Pencil'), which was discovered in Goodwin Sands. She also contributed to the 2016 World Economic Forum, where she discussed how nano-composite materials could use heat from a vehicle's engine to power air conditioning.

Her recent work focusses on how nanomaterials interact with biological systems, including the toxicity of nanoparticles and development of plasmonic materials for biosensing. She works with the heritage sector to develop new materials and conservation techniques. She has worked with the Science Museum, the Royal Air Force Museum London and the Victoria and Albert Museum. She collaborates extensively with Dr Eleanor Schofield, Head of Conservation and Collections Care at the Mary Rose Trust.

In 2017, she was appointed Vice Dean of Research for the Faculty of Engineering at Imperial College London. She is the Director of the Imperial-Shell University Technology Centre in Advanced Interfacial Materials Science. Ryan is a member of the London Centre for Nanotechnology. She is an editor for Nature's Materials Degradation Journal.

She was elected a Fellow of the Royal Academy of Engineering in 2015. She is a Fellow of the Institute of Materials, Minerals and Mining. She is a member of the Strategic Advisory Network of the Engineering and Physical Sciences Research Council. She is a Trustee of the Heritage science forum.

Ryan was appointed Commander of the Order of the British Empire (CBE) in the 2022 Birthday Honours for services to education and materials science and engineering.
