= London Centre for Nanotechnology =

Research institution in London, United Kingdom

Coordinates: 51.525387°N 0.133027°W

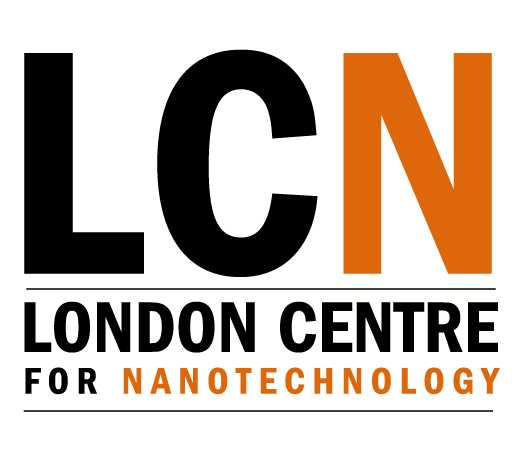
- Established: 2003
- Director: Professor Steven Bramwell; Professor Sandrine Heutz; Professor Anatoly Zayats
- Administrative staff: Around 130
- Location: London, United Kingdom
- Website: London Centre for Nanotechnology

The London Centre for Nanotechnology is a multidisciplinary research centre in physical and biomedical nanotechnology in London, United Kingdom. It brings together three institutions that are referents in nanotechnology, University College London, Imperial College London and King's College London. It was conceived from the outset with a management structure allowing for a clear focus on exploitation and commercialisation. Although based at UCL's campus in Bloomsbury, the LCN includes research in departments of Imperial's South Kensington campus and in King's Strand campus.

The LCN's work requires it to draw on the combined skills of multiple departments, including medicine, chemistry, physics, electrical and electronic engineering, biochemical engineering, materials and earth sciences, and two leading business centres.

== History ==
The London Centre for Nanotechnology was established as a joint venture between UCL and Imperial College London in 2003 following the award of a £13.65m higher education grant under the Science Research Infrastructure Fund. In October 2006 the LCN installed the first monochromated electron microscope in the UK at its site on the Imperial College London campus.

In October 2008 the LCN published research about the possibility of using microscopic "nanoprobes" to discover new drugs to combat antibiotic resistance. In October 2009 a team at the Science and Technology Facilities Council's ISIS facility led by Steven Bramwell of the LCN published research showing that single magnetic charges be made to behave and interact like electrical ones through the use of the magnetic monopoles that exist in spin ice.

King's College London joined the LCN in 2018.

== Research areas ==
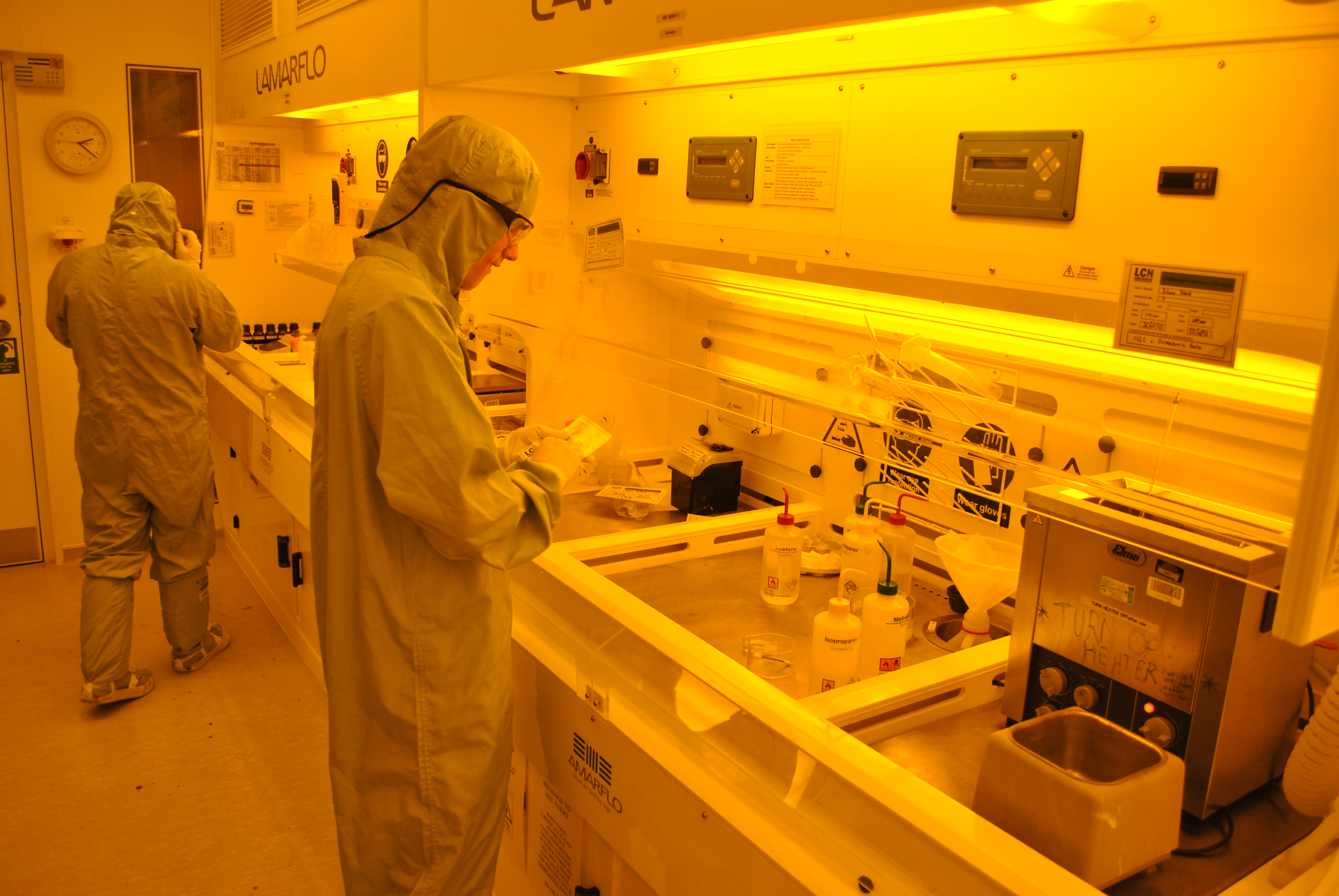
Scientists in the photolithography laboratory in the London Centre for Nanotechnology cleanroom. The room is lit with orange lighting to avoid damage to the photoresist which could occur if there were ambient light at short wavelengths.

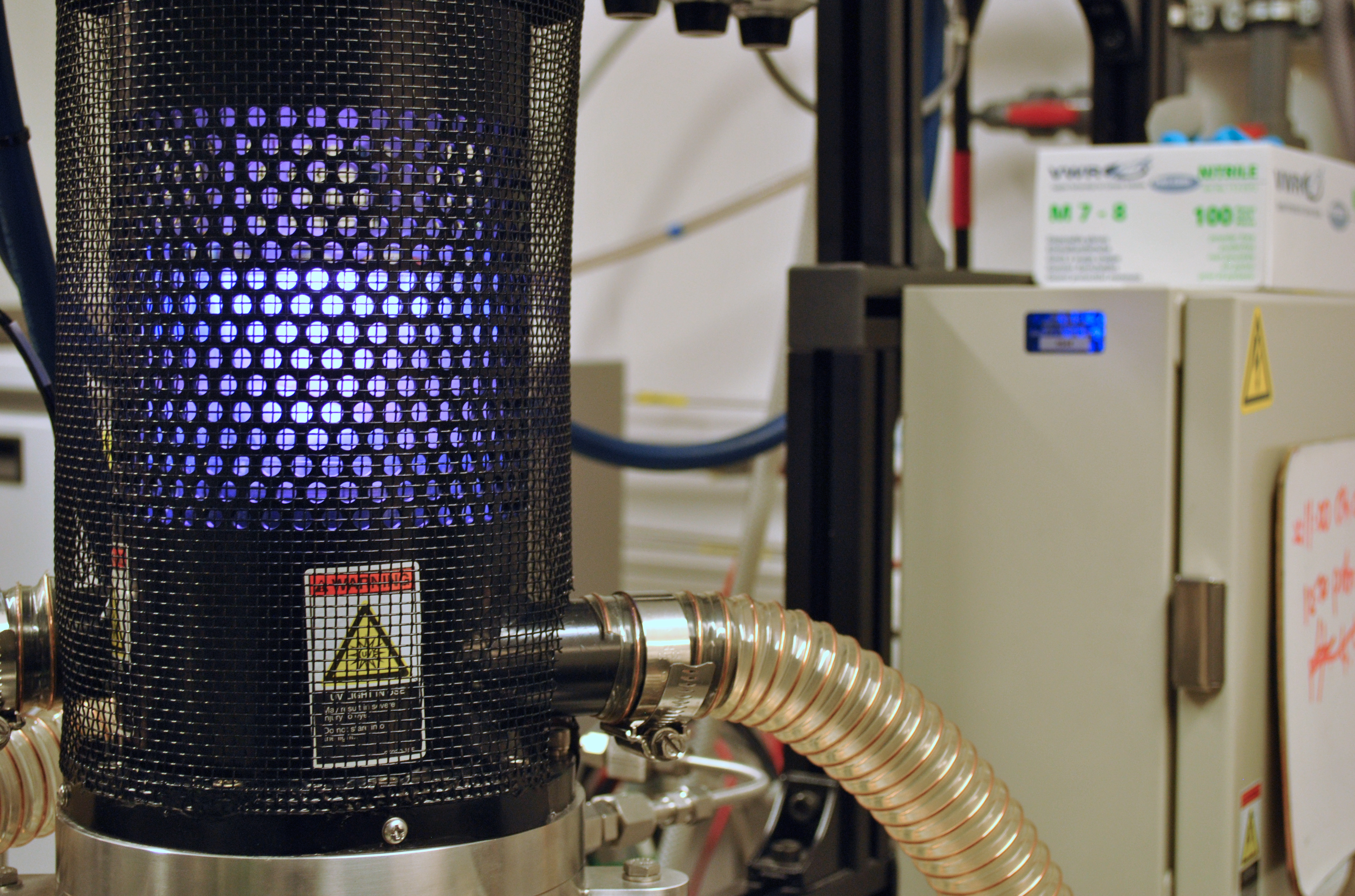
Chemical vapour deposition machine in the diamond laboratory of the London Centre for Nanotechnology

LCN's research is organised around three themes, which it characterizes as follows:

• Information Technology: Computing and communications needs continue to grow and underpin all other human endeavours. Current technologies are limited and new nanotechnology-driven paradigms such as quantum computing and spintronics are needed.

• Health care: Under development are specialised sensors and novel cancer-diagnosis systems, as well as new insights into cellular biophysics and nanotechnology-based instrumentation.

• Planet Care: The LCN uses its expertise, ranging from biology to chemistry and materials science, to conduct research in areas including novel photovoltaics, new approaches to exploring current energy supplies, low-power lighting and computing, new materials, instrumentation for the nuclear industry, and storing hydrogen efficiently at room temperature.

IT	Healthcare	Planet Care
Quantum computing	Medical diagnostics & sensor	Photovoltaics/solar cells
Material growth/synthesis	Nanoscale drug testing	Fuel cells and electrodes
Scan-probes	Bio-inspired materials	Hydrogen storage
Modelling/simulation	Lab on chip/tip	Composite Materials
Novel materials	Molecular simulation	Novel displays
Hybrid devices and systems	Disease studies	Nuclear fusion and fission
Large-scale electronics	Cell & tissue-device interfaces	Eco-processing
MEMS and vacuum devices	Medical imaging	Novel manufacturing methods
Spintronics/superconductors	Cell biomechanics	Nanoparticle applications
Photonics	Multifunctional bionanoparticles	Fossil fuel exploration

== Facilities ==
LCN has access to a range of facilities include:

• Nano-CAD: techniques to simulate, visualize and design nano-scale structures and devices in the biological and non-biological areas; first principles atomic/molecular level theory, systems modelling and other powerful computational tools.

• Nano-characterisation: the full range of optical, electron, ion and scan-probe based technologies required to image and understand nanostructures in both the biological and non-biological areas - measuring nano-electrical, structural, mechanical, rheological, acoustic, thermal and magnetic properties.

• Nano-fabrication: large clean-room space with the ability to produce nano-materials and devices using various biological and non-biological materials; silicon, III-V fabrication and unconventional fabrication – for example, of organics and diamond.

• Systems: the range of techniques required to translate nanotechnology into workable products for industry; hybridisation and integration techniques, error handling and re-routing algorithms, methods to connect bio- and non-bio systems.
