= Helen M. Chan =

British engineer and materials scientist

- Education: Imperial College London (BS, PhD)
- Scientific career
- Fields: Materials science
- Workplaces: Lehigh University; National Institute of Standards and Technology
- Thesis: The recrystallisation behaviour of some two-phase aluminium alloys (1982)

Helen M. Chan is a British-born American materials scientist, and teacher. She is the New Jersey Zinc Professor at Lehigh University. Her work considers the development of ceramic-metal nanocomposites. She is on the board of directors of the American Ceramic Society.

== Early life and education ==
Chan was born in London, and grew up in Northamptonshire. Her parents emigrated from Hong Kong.

She attended an open day at Imperial College London where she saw a demonstration involving liquid oxygen and became interested in materials science. She studied materials science at Imperial College London. She received an academic scholarship and was awarded the Governor's Prize for outstanding academic performance in 1979. She was made a doctoral student at Imperial College London and in 1982 employed by the Department of Materials a postdoctoral researcher. Whilst a PhD student Chan attended a scientific conference in Denmark, where a bus driver remarked "teaching a woman science, one might as well teach a telegraph pole".

== Career ==
Chan has described London as her favourite city. Chan is married with two children. Chan is an editor of Journal of the American Ceramic Society.

Chan joined the faculty at Lehigh University in 1986. Soon after she was appointed to the National Institute of Standards and Technology, where she worked in the Mechanical Properties Group of the Ceramics Division. She returned to Lehigh University in 1988, made Associate Professor in 1991 and Full Professor in 2005. In 2006 she was made Chair of the Department of Materials Science.

Chan's research considers the structure and material properties of nanocomposites. She uses reactive processing to create unique ceramic structures, which include cellular and nanopatterned materials. She has investigated how dopants and interfacial chemistry affect diffusion limited processes in ceramics. Chan is interested in manipulating the nanostructure of ceramic-metal composites to control their magnetic and electric properties. The oxidation rates of high temperature alloys can be controlled using reactive elements such as Yttrium and Hafnium.

She was awarded a Fulbright Program scholarship to spend a year at the Graz University of Technology. In September 2019 Chan was elected to the board of directors of the American Ceramic Society.

== Awards and honours ==
Her awards and honours include:

- 1986, 1990, 1992, 1999 and 2017 American Chemical Society Roland B. Snow award
- 1990 Alfred Noble Robinson Award
- 1991, 1992 and 2007 Lehigh University Service Teaching Excellence Award
- 1992 ASM International Bradley Stoughton Award
- 1999 New Jersey Zinc Professor
- 2005 Elected Fellow of the American Ceramic Society
- 2005 Lehigh University Prize for Excellence in Research
- 2011 Elected Chair of the University Materials Council

== Publications ==
Her publications include:

- Chan, Helen M. (1986). "Compensating Defects in Highly Donor‐Doped BaTiO_{3}". Journal of the American Ceramic Society. 69 (6): 507–510. doi:10.1111/j.1151-2916.1986.tb07453.x.
- Chan, Helen M. (1989). "Ordering Structure and Dielectric Properties of Undoped and La/Na‐Doped Pb(Mg_{1}/3Nb_{2}/3)O_{3}". Journal of the American Ceramic Society. 72 (4): 593–598. doi:10.1111/j.1151-2916.1989.tb06180.x.
- Chan, Helen M. (1993). "Mechanical Behavior of Alumina–Silicon Carbide "Nanocomposites"". Journal of the American Ceramic Society. 76 (2): 503–510. doi:10.1111/j.1151-2916.1993.tb03814.x.
