= Steven T. Bramwell =

British scientist (born 1961)

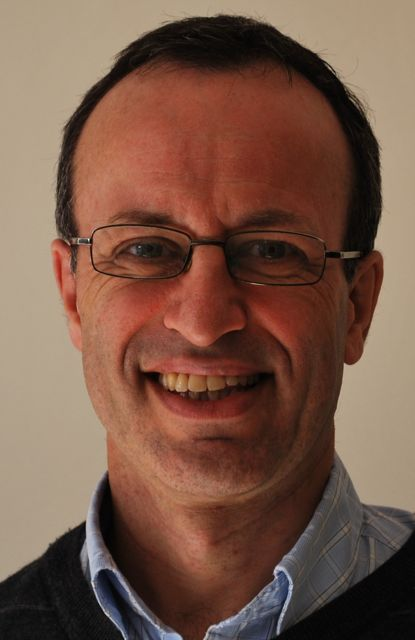
- Born: 7 June 1961 (age 65)
- Education: Oxford University
- Known for: spin ice magnetic monopole magnetricity BHP distribution
- Awards: Holweck Prize (2010); Europhysics Prize (2012)
- Scientific career
- Fields: Condensed matter physics
- Workplaces: London Centre for Nanotechnology, University College London
- Website: www.ucl.ac.uk/physics-astronomy/people/professor-steven-bramwell

Steven T. Bramwell (born 7 June 1961) is a British physicist and chemist who works at the London Centre for Nanotechnology and the Department of Physics and Astronomy, University College London. He is known for his experimental discovery of spin ice with M. J. Harris and his calculation of a critical exponent observed in two-dimensional magnets with P. C. W. Holdsworth. A probability distribution for global quantities in complex systems, the "Bramwell-Holdsworth-Pinton (BHP) distribution", (to be implemented in Mathematica) is named after him.

In 2009, Bramwell's group was one of several to report experimental evidence of magnetic monopole excitations in spin ice. He coined the term "magnetricity" to describe currents of these effective magnetic "monopoles" in condensed-matter systems.

Bramwell studied chemistry at Oxford University, obtaining his PhD in 1989. He was a professor of physical chemistry at University College London from 2000-2009, before becoming a Professor in the Department of Physics and Astronomy.

== Honours and distinctions ==
Bramwell was awarded the 2010 Holweck Prize of the British Institute of Physics and the Société Française de Physique (SFP) for "pioneering new concepts in the experimental and theoretical study of spin systems". He shared the 2012 Europhysics Prize of the European Physical Society Condensed Matter Division "for the prediction and experimental observation of magnetic monopoles in spin ice". He is a Fellow of the Institute of Physics.

In 2010 he won the Times Higher Education research project of the year for "magnetricity", and was named by The Times on their list of the 100 top UK scientists.

In 2019, Bramwell was awarded an honorary doctorate (FDhc) at Uppsala University in recognition of his work on spin ice, two-dimensional magnetism and longstanding collaboration with researchers at the Ångström Laboratory.

== Selected publications ==
- Harris, M.; Bramwell, S.; McMorrow, D.; Zeiske, T.; Godfrey, K. (1997). "Geometrical Frustration in the Ferromagnetic Pyrochlore Ho2Ti2O7" (PDF). Physical Review Letters. 79 (13): 2554–2557. Bibcode:1997PhRvL..79.2554H. doi:10.1103/PhysRevLett.79.2554. hdl:20.500.11820/f7958ee9-5fb1-4965-8ab3-70c50216943c.
- Bramwell, S T; Harris, M J (13 April 1998). "Frustration in Ising-type spin models on the pyrochlore lattice". Journal of Physics: Condensed Matter. 10 (14): L215–L220. Bibcode:1998JPCM...10L.215B. doi:10.1088/0953-8984/10/14/002. S2CID 250785872.
- Bramwell, S. T. (16 November 2001). "Spin Ice State in Frustrated Magnetic Pyrochlore Materials". Science. 294 (5546): 1495–1501. arXiv:cond-mat/0201427. Bibcode:2001Sci...294.1495B. doi:10.1126/science.1064761. PMID 11711667. S2CID 9402061.
- Bramwell, S T; Holdsworth, P C W (25 January 1993). "Magnetization and universal sub-critical behaviour in two-dimensional XY magnets". Journal of Physics: Condensed Matter. 5 (4): L53–L59. Bibcode:1993JPCM....5L..53B. doi:10.1088/0953-8984/5/4/004. S2CID 250912649.
- Holdsworth, P. C. W.; Bramwell, S. T.; Pinton, J.-F. (10 December 1998). "Universality of rare fluctuations in turbulence and critical phenomena". Nature. 396 (6711): 552–554. Bibcode:1998Natur.396..552B. doi:10.1038/25083. S2CID 4373805.
- Bramwell, S.; Christensen, K.; Fortin, J.-Y.; Holdsworth, P.; Jensen, H.; Lise, S.; López, J.; Nicodemi, M.; Pinton, J.-F.; Sellitto, M. (2000). "Universal Fluctuations in Correlated Systems". Physical Review Letters. 84 (17): 3744–3747. arXiv:cond-mat/9912255. Bibcode:2000PhRvL..84.3744B. doi:10.1103/PhysRevLett.84.3744. PMID 11019195. S2CID 46664222.
- Fennell, T.; Deen, P. P.; Wildes, A. R.; Schmalzl, K.; Prabhakaran, D.; Boothroyd, A. T.; Aldus, R. J.; McMorrow, D. F.; Bramwell, S. T. (3 September 2009). "Magnetic Coulomb Phase in the Spin Ice Ho2Ti2O7". Science. 326 (5951): 415–417. arXiv:0907.0954. Bibcode:2009Sci...326..415F. doi:10.1126/science.1177582. PMID 19729619. S2CID 206521792.
- Bramwell, S. T.; Giblin, S. R.; Calder, S.; Aldus, R.; Prabhakaran, D.; Fennell, T. (15 October 2009). "Measurement of the charge and current of magnetic monopoles in spin ice". Nature. 461 (7266): 956–959. arXiv:0907.0956. Bibcode:2009Natur.461..956B. doi:10.1038/nature08500. PMID 19829376. S2CID 4399620.
