= Gunko =

Gunko, Hunko or Gun'ko (Ukrainian or Russian: Гунько) is a gender-neutral Ukrainian surname that may refer to

- Andrej Hunko (born 1963), German politician
- Dmitri Gunko (born 1976), Russian football coach and former player
- Sergei Gunko (born 1973), Russian football coach and former player
- Yuri Gunko (born 1972), Ukrainian ice hockey player
- Yurii Gun'ko, Belarusian chemist
