= Fionn Dunne =

Materials scientist

Professor Fionn Dunne FREng FIMMM
- Born: Fionn Patrick Edward Dunne
- Education: University of Galway (BSc); University of Bristol (MEngSc); University of Sheffield (PhD)
- Awards: Harvey Flower Titanium Prize (IOM3); Outstanding Research Team (Imperial College)
- Scientific career
- Fields: Materials science specialised in Crystal plasticity Hexagonal close-packed and Ni alloys Micromechanics; Fatigue and Fracture mechanics
- Institutions: University of Manchester; University of Oxford; Imperial College London
- Thesis: Computer Aided Modelling of Creep-cyclic Plasticity Interaction in Engineering Materials and Structures
- Doctoral advisor: D.R. Hayhurst
- Website: Imperial College London; MIDAS

Fionn Patrick Edward Dunne is a professor of Materials Science at Imperial College London and holds the Chair in Micromechanics and the Royal Academy of Engineering/Rolls-Royce Research Chair. Dunne specialises in computational crystal plasticity and microstructure-sensitive nucleation and growth of short fatigue cracks in engineering materials, mainly Nickel, Titanium and Zirconium alloys.

== Early life and education ==
Dunne completed a Bachelor of Science at the Department of Mechanical Engineering, University of Galway, and Master of Engineering degree from the Department of Mechanical Engineering, University of Bristol by 1989, before moving to the Department of Mechanical and Process Engineering, University of Sheffield, for a Doctor of Philosophy in Computer Aided Modelling of Creep-cyclic Plasticity Interaction in Engineering Materials and Structures.

== Research and career ==
In 1994, Dunne was appointed as a postdoctoral research associate in the Department of Mechanical Engineering, University of Manchester (UMIST), before being appointed a Research Fellowship at Hertford College, Oxford and the Department of Engineering Science, University of Oxford from 1996 until 2012. He became the deputy head of the department but moved to Imperial College London in 2012. He is an Emeritus Fellow of Hertford College, Oxford.

While in Oxford, Dunne was part of the Materials for fusion & fission power program. He led the Micro-mechanical modelling techniques for forming texture, non-proportionality and failure in auto materials program at the Department of Engineering Science, University of Oxford between October 2011 and June 2012, when he moved the grant with him to the Department of Materials, Imperial College London from June 2012 until it ended in March 2015.

He also led the Heterogeneous Mechanics in Hexagonal Alloys across Length and Time Scales (HexMat) program, which was Engineering and Physical Sciences Research Council (EPSRC) funded at a value of £5 million between May 2013 and November 2018. Dunne was the director of the Rolls-Royce Nuclear University Technology Centre at Imperial College London. He is part of a £7.2 million program on Mechanistic understanding of Irradiation Damage in fuel Assemblies (MIDAS) that is funded by Engineering and Physical Sciences Research Council until April 2024.

As of November 2022, Dunne is a professor of Materials Science at Imperial College London and holds the Chair in Micromechanics and the Royal Academy of Engineering (RAEng)/Rolls-Royce Research Chair. He is also a Rolls-Royce consultant, and an honorary professor and co-director of the Beijing International Aeronautical Materials (BIAM).

Dunne's research focuses on computational crystal plasticity, discrete dislocation plasticity, and microstructure-sensitive nucleation and growth of short fatigue cracks in engineering materials, mainly Nickel, Titanium, and Zirconium alloys.

== Awards and honours ==
In 2010, Dunne was elected a Fellow of the Royal Academy of Engineering (FREng). In 2016, he was awarded the Institute of Materials, Minerals and Mining (IOM3) Harvey Flower Titanium Prize. In 2017, Dunne's Engineering Alloys team shared the Imperial President's Award for Outstanding Research Team with Chris Phillips’s team.

== Selected publications ==
- Dunne, Fionn; Petrinic, Nik (2005). Introduction to computational plasticity. Oxford: Oxford University Press. ISBN 978-1-4294-5996-9. OCLC 85895917.
- McDowell, D.L.; Dunne, F.P.E. (2010). "Microstructure-sensitive computational modeling of fatigue crack formation". International Journal of Fatigue. 32 (9). Elsevier BV: 1521–1542. doi:10.1016/j.ijfatigue.2010.01.003. ISSN 0142-1123.
- Dunne, F.P.E.; Rugg, D.; Walker, A. (2007). "Lengthscale-dependent, elastically anisotropic, physically-based hcp crystal plasticity: Application to cold-dwell fatigue in Ti alloys". International Journal of Plasticity. 23 (6). Elsevier BV: 1061–1083. doi:10.1016/j.ijplas.2006.10.013. ISSN 0749-6419.
- Britton, T. B.; Liang, H.; Dunne, F. P. E.; Wilkinson, A. J. (2009-11-11). "The effect of crystal orientation on the indentation response of commercially pure titanium: experiments and simulations". Proceedings of the Royal Society A: Mathematical, Physical and Engineering Sciences. 466 (2115). The Royal Society: 695–719. Bibcode:2010RSPSA.466..695B. doi:10.1098/rspa.2009.0455. ISSN 1364-5021. S2CID 2030079.
- Korsunsky, A; Dini, D; Dunne, F; Walsh, M (2007). "Comparative assessment of dissipated energy and other fatigue criteria?". International Journal of Fatigue. 29 (9–11). Elsevier BV: 1990–1995. doi:10.1016/j.ijfatigue.2007.01.007. hdl:10044/1/1339. ISSN 0142-1123.
- Wan, V.V.C.; MacLachlan, D.W.; Dunne, F.P.E. (2014). "A stored energy criterion for fatigue crack nucleation in polycrystals". International Journal of Fatigue. 68. Elsevier BV: 90–102. doi:10.1016/j.ijfatigue.2014.06.001. ISSN 0142-1123.
- Chen, Bo; Jiang, Jun; Dunne, Fionn P.E. (2018). "Is stored energy density the primary meso-scale mechanistic driver for fatigue crack nucleation?". International Journal of Plasticity. 101. Elsevier BV: 213–229. doi:10.1016/j.ijplas.2017.11.005. hdl:10044/1/61871. ISSN 0749-6419.
