= Sandrine Heutz =

Professor of Functional Molecular Materials

Sandrine Heutz FRSC CChem CPhys
- Born: Sandrine Elizabeth Monique Heutz
- Education: University of Liège; Imperial College London (PhD)
- Scientific career
- Workplaces: Imperial College London; Chemnitz University of Technology; University College London
- Thesis: Structural, spectroscopic and morphological properties of molecular thin film heterostructures (2002)
- Website: www.imperial.ac.uk/people/s.heutz

Sandrine Elizabeth Monique Heutz FRSC CChem CPhys is a Professor of Functional Molecular Materials at Imperial College London. She works on organic and magnetically coupled molecular materials for spintronic applications. In 2008 Heutz was awarded the Institute of Materials, Minerals and Mining Silver Medal.

== Early life and education ==
Heutz studied chemistry at the University of Liège. She moved to Imperial College London for her doctoral studies, where she worked on thin film heterostructures. During her doctoral research Heutz worked with Dietrich Zahn at Chemnitz University of Technology.

== Research and career ==
After earning her PhD degree Heutz worked as a postdoctoral research fellow on solar cells at Imperial College London. She moved to University College London in 2004, where she started work on magnetic biosensors. Heutz joined Imperial College London in 2007 as a Royal Society Dorothy Hodgkin research fellow. Heutz specialises in the use of electron paramagnetic resonance (EPR) to monitor unpaired electrons within materials. She used EPR to monitor spins within copper phthalocyanine solar cells. Whilst working on new materials for photovoltaics, Heutz showed that electrons in copper phthalocyanine (a blue pigment found in a Bank of England £5 note) exist in a superposition of two different spin states. She demonstrated that copper phthalocyanine could be used for quantum computing, where information is stored as qubits as opposed to binary bits.

Heutz has continued to work on room temperature magnetic organic materials for spintronic applications, working with Nic Harrison, the co-director of the Institute for Molecular Science and Engineering at Imperial College London. Together they have explored new approaches to grow phthalocyanine thin films with desired structural and spectroscopic properties. She has shown that at low temperatures (100 K) cobalt phthalocyanine forms molecular structures with strong magnetic alignment. Heutz and her research group have developed flexible thin films of cobalt phthalocyanine for use in spintronic devices. Harrison contributed theoretical models of cobalt phthalocyanine, and demonstrated that by manipulating the angle between adjacent layers of cobalt phthalocyanine it is possible to improve the magnetic properties of the material. This finding explains how cobalt phthalocyanine demonstrates magnetic properties above liquid nitrogen temperatures.

In 2018 Heutz demonstrated that pentacene could undergo singlet fission – absorbing a single photon could result in the generation of two excited electrons. She demonstrated that the molecular orientation of pentacene within a solar cell could increase the power output. Pentacene packs in a herringbone structure and each molecule can either be parallel or tilted with respect to its neighbours. Heutz and colleagues demonstrated that when pentacene molecules are tilted toward each other they are more likely to undergo singlet fission than when they are tilted. The work was the first to show that pentacene could undergo singlet fission at room temperature. In 2017 Heutz was awarded a multi-million pound research grant from the Engineering and Physical Sciences Research Council (EPSRC) to open the UK's first SPIN-Lab.

Heutz was promoted to professor in 2019. She has appeared on the podcast Scientists Not the Science. Heutz is a member of the London Centre for Nanotechnology and the Henry Royce Institute at the University of Manchester.

=== Selected publications ===
Her publications include;

- Using Self‐Assembling Dipole Molecules to Improve Hole Injection in Conjugated Polymers
- Potential for spin-based information processing in a thin-film molecular semiconductor
- Molecular Thin Films: A New Type of Magnetic Switch

=== Awards and honours ===
Heutz was awarded the 2008 Institute of Materials, Minerals and Mining (IOM3) silver medal for her research on organic thin films. In particular she had developed new electron - donor morphologies for efficient solar cells. Heutz was elected a Fellow of the Royal Society of Chemistry (FRSC) in 2018.
