= William Chandler Roberts-Austen =

Englist metallurgist (1843–1902)

William Chandler Roberts-Austen KCB FRS
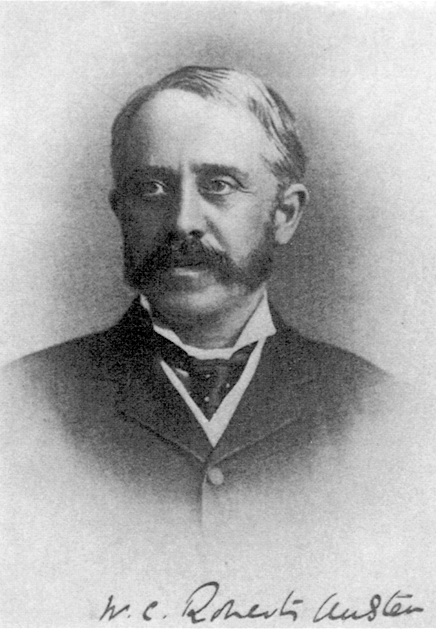
- Born: William Chandler Roberts; March 3, 1843; Kennington, Surrey, England
- Died: November 22, 1902 (aged 59); London, England
- Education: Royal School of Mines
- Known for: Austenite
- Spouse: Florence Maude Alldridge
- Awards: Royal Society Bakerian Medal
- Scientific career
- Fields: Metallurgy
- Workplaces: Royal Mint; Royal School of Mines

Sir William Chandler Roberts-Austen KCB FRS (3 March 1843 in Kennington – 22 November 1902 in London) was an English metallurgist noted for his research on the physical properties of metals and their alloys. The austenite class of iron alloys is named after him.

He was born William Chandler Roberts in Kennington, Surrey, the son of George and Maria née Chandler Roberts. He later (1885) assumed the name of Roberts-Austen at the request of his uncle, Major Nathaniel Lawrence Austen, as a condition of inheritance. He was educated privately and at the Royal School of Mines (1861–1865).

He was appointed Assistant to the Master of the Mint and then Chemist of the Royal Mint (1869), Professor of Metallurgy at the School of Mines (1880) and Chemist and Assayer to the Royal Mint (1882–1902). He developed procedures for the analysis of alloy constituents and an automatic recording pyrometer used to record temperature changes in furnaces and molten materials. He became a world authority on the technical aspects of minting coins. His work had many practical and industrial applications.

He was elected a Fellow of the Royal Society in June 1875 and was their Bakerian Lecturer in 1896. He was made CB in 1890 and knighted (KCB) in 1899. He was also a Chevalier of the Legion d'honneur.

He was largely responsible for the building of St Martin's chapel of ease, Blackheath, Surrey, in 1893. He died at his residence in the Royal Mint and was buried in St Martin's churchyard, Canterbury, Kent.

He had married Florence Maude Alldridge in London in 1876.
