= Cell biomechanics =

Cell biomechanics is a branch of biomechanics that involves single molecules, molecular interactions, or cells as the system of interest. Cells generate and maintain mechanical forces within their environment as a part of their physiology. Cell biomechanics deals with how mRNA, protein production, and gene expression is affected by said environment and with mechanical properties of isolated molecules or interaction of proteins that make up molecular motors.

It is known that minor alterations in mechanical properties of cells can be an indicator of an infected cell. By studying these mechanical properties, greater insight will be gained in regards to disease. Thus, the goal of understanding cell biomechanics is to combine theoretical, experimental, and computational approaches to construct a realistic description of cell mechanical behaviors to provide new insights on the role of mechanics in disease.

== History ==
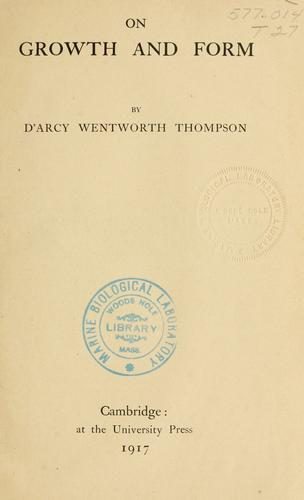
On Growth and Form by D'Arcy Wentworth Thompson

In the late seventeenth century, English polymath Robert Hooke and Dutch scientist Antonie van Leeuwenhoek looked into ciliate Vorticella with extreme fluid and cellular motion using a simple optical microscope. On 25 December 1907, van Leeuwenhoek described his observations in a letter: "In structure these little animals were fashioned like a bell, and at the round opening they made such a stir, that the particles in the water thereabout were set in motion thereby…which sight I found mightily diverting" Prior to this, Brownian motion of particles and organelles within living cells had been discovered, as well as theories to measure viscosity. However, there were not enough accessible technical tools to perform these accurate experiments at the time. Thus, mechanical properties within cells were only supported qualitatively by observation.

With these new discoveries, the role of mechanical forces within biology was not always naturally accepted. In 1850, English physician William Benjamin Carpenter wrote "many of the actions taking place in the living body are conformable to the laws of mechanics, has been hastily assumed as justifying the conclusion that all its actions are mechanical." Similarly, in 1917, Scottish mathematical biologist D'Arcy Wentworth Thompson noted "…though they resemble known physical phenomena, their nature is still the subject of much dubiety and discussion, and neither the forms produced nor the forces at work can yet be satisfactorily and simply explained" in his book On Growth and Form.

In the nineteenth century industrialization era, the overall understanding of the cell and tissue mechanics finally developed as it related to the mechanical, structural testing and theory (indentation, beam bending, the Hertz model) of engines, boats, and bridges. At the end of the nineteenth century, the mechanical properties of living cells were able to be experimentally analyzed and examined using techniques provided by large scale engineering mechanics. Since 2008, nanoscale testing and modeling remains fundamentally based on these nineteenth century practices.

== Research methods ==
Various studies have been conducted to establish relationships between the structure, mechanical responses, and function of biological tissues (e.g. blood vessels, cardiac muscle, lung tissue). To conduct this research, there have been several developed tools and techniques which are sensitive to detect such small forces. At this time, these techniques are only applicable in a controlled environment (such as a test tube or petri dish). All of these methods ultimately give insight on mechanical properties of cells.

These techniques can generally be split up into two sections: active methods and passive methods. Active methods are methods that apply forces onto cells in some manner to deform the cell. Passive methods are methods that sense mechanical forces and do not apply any external forces to the cell.

=== Active methods ===
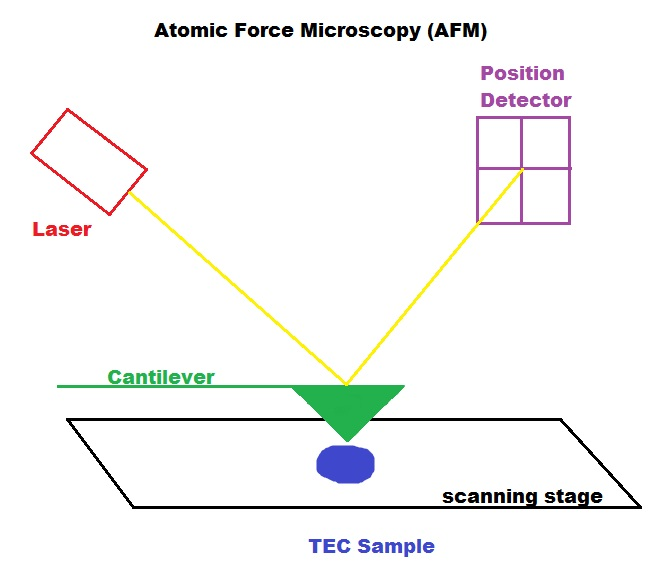
Atomic force microscopy diagram

==== Atomic force microscopy ====
Atomic force microscopy is an interaction between a tip attached to a flexible cantilever and the molecule on a cell surface. The sharp tip can be used to probe single molecular events and image live cells. The relative deformation of the cell and the tip can be used to estimate how much force was applied and how stiff the cell is. Since it is a high force measurement technique, large scale deformations and reorganizations can be observed and mapped.

Some drawbacks of this technique include but are not limited to an overestimation of force-versus-indentation curve given no applied force, potential cell damage, variety of tip shapes that determine nature of force-deformation curve.

==== Magnetic tweezers and magnetic twisting cytometry ====
Magnetic twisting cytometry is mainly used to determine physical properties of biological tissues. They can also be used for micromanipulating cells.

Beads are exposed to magnetizing coils leading to a magnetic dipole moment. A weaker directional magnetic field is then applied to twist the beads through a specific angle or to move the beads lineary. Some disadvantages to this system include the difficulty to control the region of the cell that the beads, no guarantee of complete binding to the cell surface, and loss of magnetization with time.

A variation of this technique is named optical tweezers where linear forces are applied to cells rather than magnetic ones. A laser beam is used alongside dielectric beads of high refractive indices to generate optical forces. Drawbacks of this method include potential photo-induced damage and a limited amount of force that can be generated.

==== Micropipette aspiration ====
Dual micropipette aspiration technique

Micropipette aspiration is primarily used for measuring absolute values of mechanical properties. On a cellular scale, it can map in space and time surface tension of interfaces within a tissue. On a tissue scale, it can measure mechanical properties such as viscoelasticity and tissue surface tension. Like AFM, it is also a high force measurement technique, where large scale deformations and reorganizations can be observed and mapped.

A micropipette gets placed on the surface of the cell and gently suctions the cell to deform it. The geometry of the deformation along with the applied pressure allows researchers to calculate the force applied along with mechanical properties of the cell. A dual micropipette assay can is also able to quantify the strength of cadherin-dependent cell-cell adhesion.

==== Stretching devices ====
Stretching devices were developed to study effects of tensile stress on cells and tissues. Cells are incubated on flexible silicone sheet elastic membranes with modifiable surfaces. They are then stretched either in an uniaxial, biaxial, or pressure-controlled manner. The stretching can also occur at different frequencies. The main downside to stretching devices is that they leave behind wrinkling patterns, distorting the actual forces that were applied on the sheets. They are also large in size and generate both heat and shock, hindering the real-time imaging of cells.

==== Carbon fiber-based systems ====
Carbon fibers are mounted in glass capillaries and attached to a position-control device with feedback control mechanism. The fibers then attach to cells and apply and record the active forces generated from the cell. This, however, may result in damage to the cells due to the attachment they have to the fibers, focus issues, and potential bias.

=== Passive methods ===
==== Elastic substratum method ====
This method stems from the classical theory of small-strain, plane-stress elasticity. The elastic substratum method allows for analysis of the displacement field of the elastic substrate over the traction field. This method is also referred to as traction force microscopy.

Cells are incubated onto a flexible silicone sheet substrate. The cells then apply force onto the sheets causing a wrinkling pattern and is analyzed through the number of wrinkles and patterns. The downside to this method is the difficulty in transforming the patterns into a traction force map leading to potential inaccuracy in identifying forces.

==== Flexible sheets with embedded beads ====
Latex or fluorescently tagged beads are embedded into elastic substratum where the position of the beads are recorded over time. Cellular forces can be assumed by these displacements. The uncertainty with this method is the interdependence of bead displacement.

A more improved technique named flexible sheets with micropatterned dots or grids considers this drawback and instead has the dots imprinted onto the flexible sheet. The deformation of the grid from the original grid is then analyzed. The same assumptions, however, are required to be made where the forces originate from the measured location and do not spread from another area.

==== Micromachined cantilever beam ====
Cantilever beam (left supported)

A horizontal cantilever beam with an attachment pad and a well is used to measure cell traction forces as cells are seeded onto substrates and crawl over the cantilevers. These cantilevers are set to measure force through cantilever deflection, stiffness, and stress gradient. Unlike the prior method, the uncertainty of no propagation is not an issue. Rather the cantilever beam can only move in only one direction leading to only one axis being measured.

The array of vertical microcantilevers is a technique that overcomes the limitations of the typical micromachined cantilever beam where there are two axes of directions available rather than a single horizontal beam. Although there is an improvement in scale and resolution, it is not suited for rapid- mass production and is quite costly. With delicate properties, minor damage would require reproduction of the device.

== Applications and usage ==
In the last 50 years, several studies have been conducted using cell biomechanics leading to greater biological control. A majority of these newly created devices are built to either provide greater insight into the human body's reaction to disease or attempt to eradicate the disease as a whole.

=== Cardiovascular cell mechanics and microcirculation ===
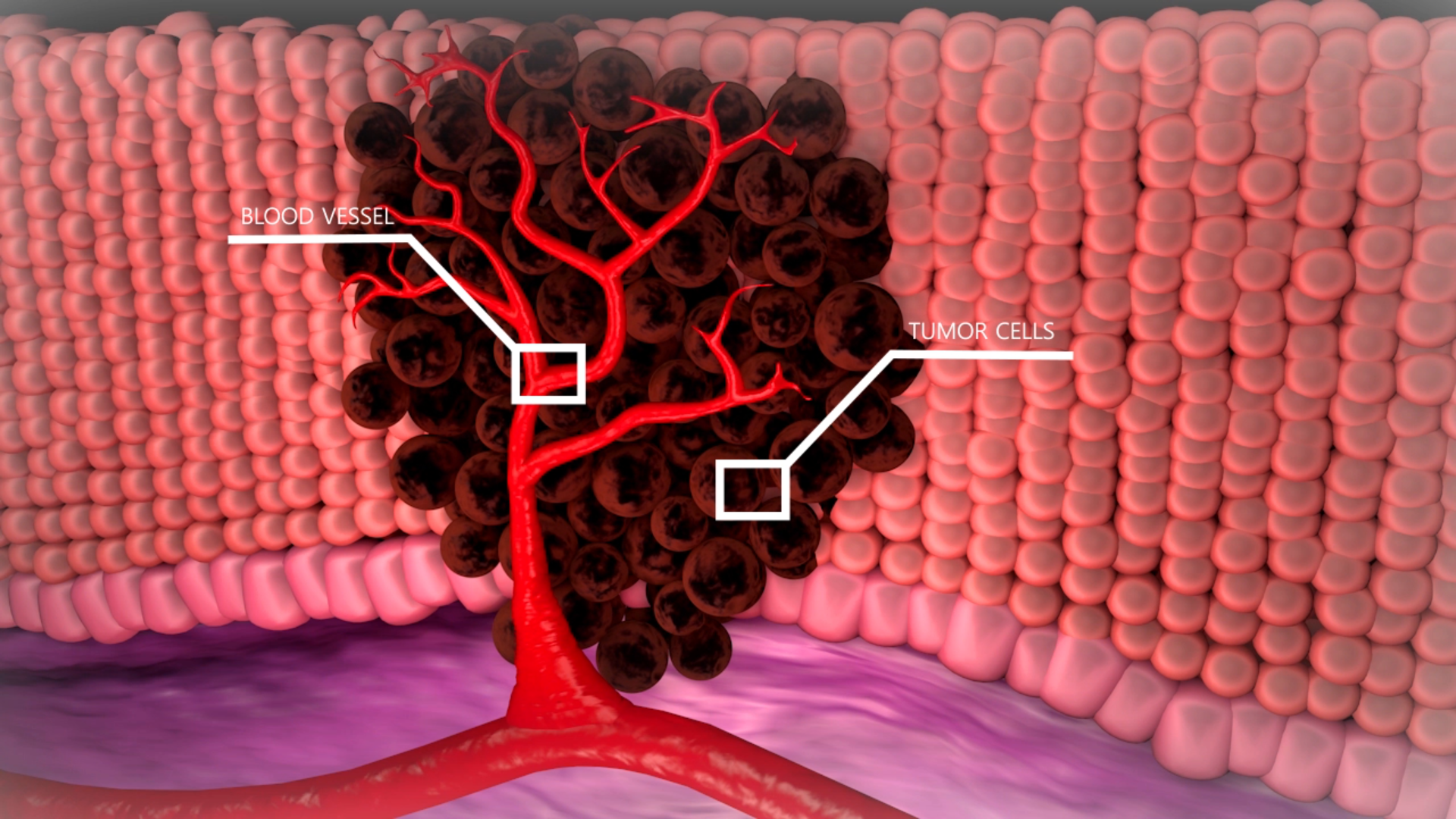
Tumor cells

Quantitative passive biomechanical models have been developed to predict cell motion and deformation in the mammalian red blood cell, a cell with a membrane with bending and shearing properties that are dependent upon strain, strain rate, and strain history, and a cytoplasm that in the normal red cell is predominantly a Newtonian viscous fluid, within a living organism. Newly developed (2007) models constitutive to this one show that biomechanical analysis not only is a starting point for prediction of the whole cell and cell suspension behavior, but also provides a reference point for molecular models of cell membranes that originate from the crystal structure of its parts.

Several generations of biomechanical models have also been developed for white blood cells, the basis of immune surveillance and inflammation. These models have been proven to effectively predict cell-cell interactions in microcirculation. Similar additional models have been created for endothelium, platelets and metastatic tumor cells.

Biomechanical analyses of different cell types in the circulation has brought greater understanding of cell interactions in the circulation, making it possible to predict cell behavior in narrow vessels. As a result, several blood diseases like inflammation and cardiovascular disease now have biomechanical footing. Models have also been developing in organs like the lung, heart, skeletal muscle, and connective tissue that are able to predict basic aspects of organ perfusion.

=== Cell enrichment and separation ===
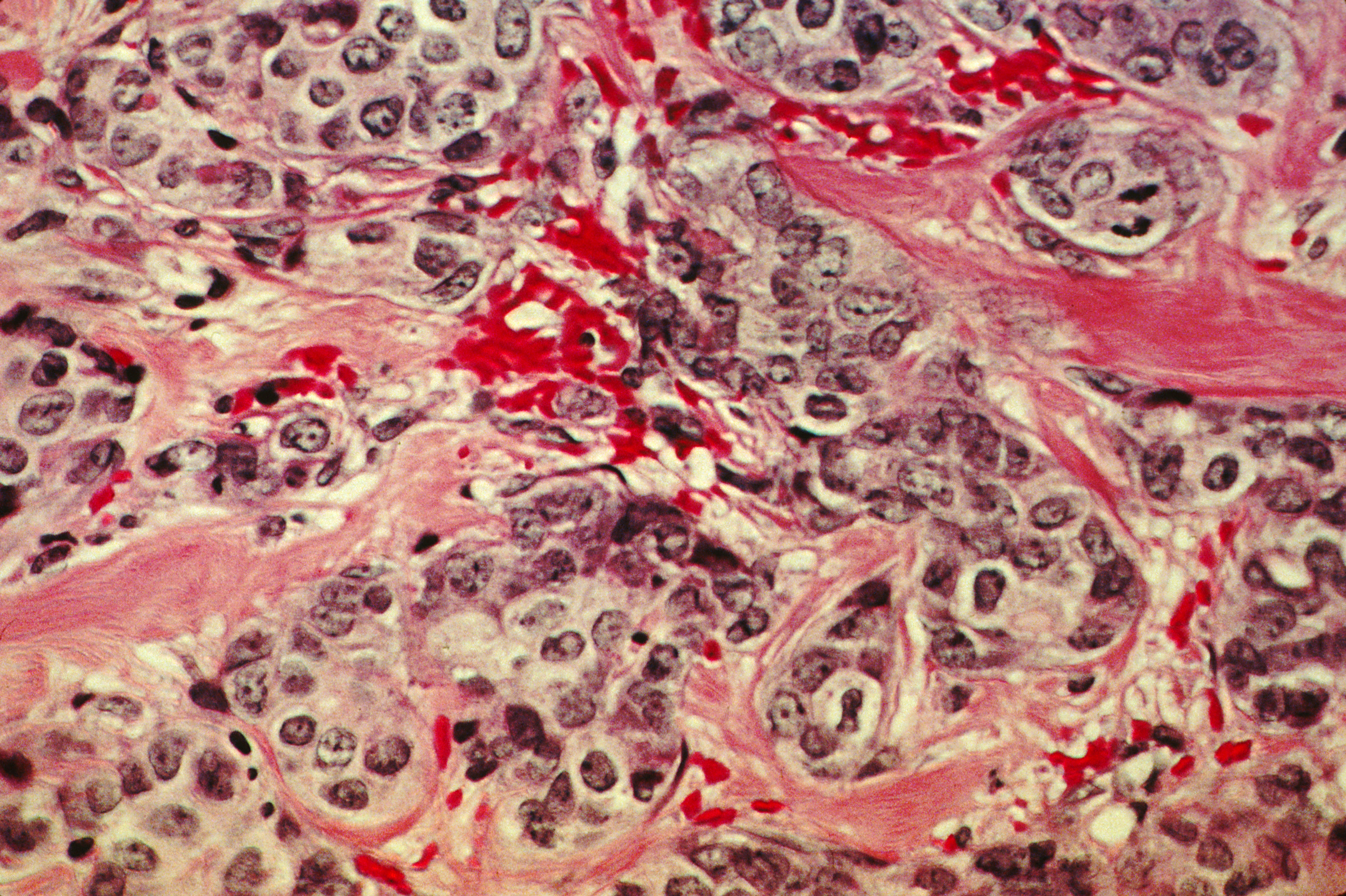
Breast cancer cells

Technology has been created from cell biomechanics to separate targeted cells. For the case of disease diagnosis and detection, said technology is able to separate healthy cells from cancerous ones through the difference in stiffness of the cell.

Deformability-based enrichment devices are an example of this technology. These devices mostly deal with cancer cells from blood. Their main feature is their ability to identify if cancer cells have separated themselves from the tumor and have entered into the bloodstream as CTCs (Circulating Tumor Cells). If they have, these devices have recently also become able to count the number of CTCs in a millimeter of blood. Using this value, medical professionals are able to determine the effectiveness of a chemotherapy treatment.

More specific examples include Assistant Professor of Mechanical Engineering at the Whiting School of Engineering Soojung Claire Hur's microfluidic device and Woodruff School of Mechanical Engineering Professor Gonghao Wang's microfluidic device that both deal with breast cancer cells. Hur's device improves metastatic breast cancer cells by balancing deformability-induced and inertial lift forces that pushes larger metastatic cancer cells to move towards the centerline of a microchannel compared to blood cells. Wang's device separates stiffer, less invasive breast cancer cells by having diagonal ridges where only more deformable and highly invasive breast cancer cells can squeeze through.

Deformability-based enrichment devices, however, are not only exclusive to cancer cells. An example of this is Nanyang Technological University Researcher Han Wei Hou's microfluidic device that separates and improves red blood cells from normal cells based on their stiffness through margination. Infected red blood cells are generally stiffer, so through his device, stiffer red blood cells would be closer to the vessel wall when normal red blood cells would stay in the center. This allows the deformed red blood cells to be collected via a separate outlet on the sides.

== Ongoing research concerns ==
In the 1800s, cells were initially thought to be of homogeneous gels, sols, viscoelastic and plastic fluids. Models currently have been developed into including a viscoelastic continuum, a combination of discrete mechanical elements, or a combination of viscoelastic fluid within a dense meshwork and have been proven to be highly accurate after experimentation. Despite these improved and more refined models, there still remain to be flaws as several experimental proofs (e.g. soft glass rheology phenomenon) refute current existing models. Thus, the time-dependent and predictive theoretical description of cell mechanics remains to be incomplete.

It is also not fully understood whether mechanical phenomena are side products of biological processes or they are controlled at the genetic and physiological level through feedback loops, actuation and response pathways given our existing knowledge of cell physiology or neurophysiology.
