= Eleanor Schofield =

English chemist and conservator

Eleanor Schofied FREng
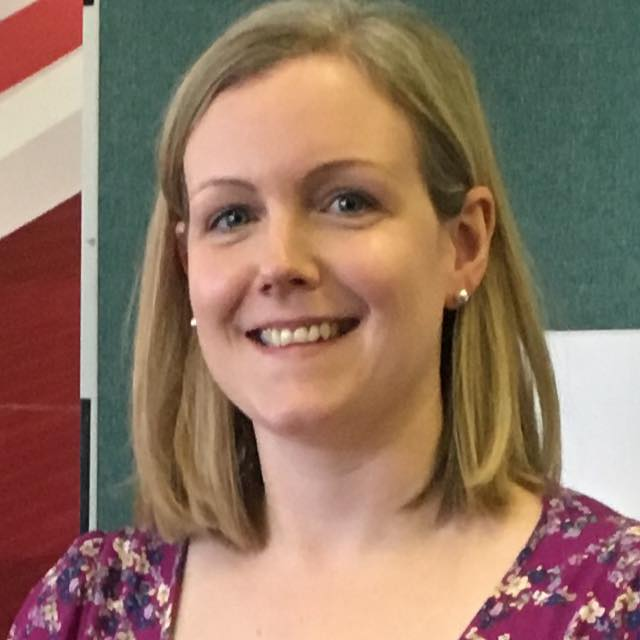
- Born: Eleanor Josephine Schofield; 26 March 1980 (age 46)
- Education: Imperial College London (MEng, PhD)
- Known for: Conservation work
- Scientific career
- Fields: Materials science
- Workplaces: Imperial College London; University of Kent; Stanford Synchrotron Radiation Lightsource; Mary Rose
- Thesis: Formation and characterisation of nanoporous materials (2006)
- Doctoral advisor: Mary Ryan
- Website: imperial.ac.uk/people/e.schofield

Eleanor Josephine Schofield (born 26 March 1980) is the Head of Conservation & Collections Care at the Mary Rose Trust. She is an honorary Professor at the University of Kent. In 2015 she was selected as one of the Royal Society of Chemistry 175 Faces of Chemistry.

== Early life and education ==
Schofield studied materials science at Imperial College London where she completed a Master of Engineering (MEng) degree followed by PhD under the supervision of Mary Ryan in 2006. She specialised in synchrotron science, working on dealloying.

== Career ==
After graduating, Schofield joined the Stanford Synchrotron Radiation Lightsource. Here she investigated ways to characterise radioactive ground water waste. She moved to the University of Kent as a postdoctoral researcher in 2009, where she worked with Alan Chadwick on sulphur in waterlogged wood.

In 2012 Schofield joined the Mary Rose Trust. In 2013 the ship drying began, and Schofield was responsible for developing a series of experiments with the Diamond Light Source and University of Kent. Today she oversees the conservation of the hull and over 19,000 other artefacts. Throughout her career at the Mary Rose, Schofield has been involved with the designers and exhibition staff.

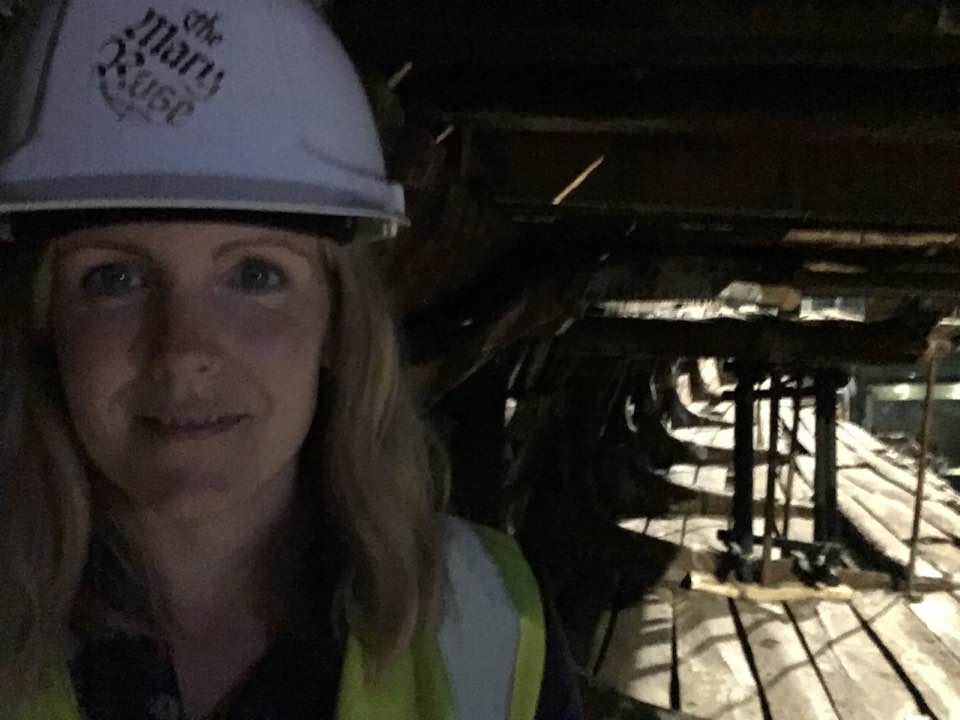
Eleanor Schofield working on the Mary Rose ship

The hull of the Mary Rose was excavated from the sea in 1982, and has since been sprayed with a cold-water spray and polyethylene glycol to replace the cellular structure of the wood. It is kept inside an environment that allows controlled air-drying. Schofield continuously monitors the amount of sulphur and iron in the warship, working with Serena Corr at the University of Glasgow. Sulphur is present on the seabed, and became incorporated into the hull of the warship whilst it was underwater. Anaerobic bacteria react with sulphur in seawater, which can then produce iron sulfides by combining with iron corroded from fixtures and artefacts. She also works with Rachel O'Reilly at the University of Birmingham as part of a Leverhulme Trust grant that looks to develop polymers that can remove iron ions from the wood, which could prevent these damaging acids from forming. To do this, Corr, O'Reilly and Schofield use core magnetic iron oxide nanoparticles that are embedded them into a thermoresponsive polymer. The treatment can be applied as a liquid, directed to particular areas of the wood using external magnetic fields. They can then be set as a gel and peeled from the surface. She studied twelve of Henry VIII of England's iron cannonballs using synchrotron X‐ray powder diffraction.

She studied the composition of the cannonballs in an effort to better preserve them. The cannonballs were produced in bulk, but subjected to different conservation methods and environments. When chlorine from salt gets inside the archaeological iron it becomes corrosive. The Mary Rose Trust keeps 900 of the cannonballs preserved in high pH water to slows down corrosion. She works with University College London and the National Physical Laboratory to study other pollutants in artefacts. She hopes that understanding the corrosion of iron will inform future conservation.

Schofield was selected as one of the Royal Society of Chemistry 175 Faces of Chemistry in 2015. In 2016, 471 years after the Mary Rose sank, Schofield was involved with the reopening of the ship to the public. In 2016 she delivered a public lecture at the Royal Society of Chemistry public lecture on Conserving a Tudor Collection. She was a speaker at the 2017 New Scientist Live. Schofield is an honorary Professor at the University of Kent.

In 2025 she was elected a Fellow of the Royal Academy of Engineering.
