= Bernard Henry (scientist) =

British materials scientist

Bernard Martin Henry
- Born: 16 January 1965
- Died: 4 February 2007 (aged 42)
- Education: Imperial College London (PhD)
- Scientific career
- Workplaces: University of Oxford
- Thesis: A microstructural study of Au/Pd/Ti ohmic contacts for AlGaAs/GaAs heterojunction bipolar transistors. (1993)

Bernard Martin Henry (16 January 1965 – 4 February 2007) was a British materials scientist who served as Associate Director of Research in Nanocomposites at the University of Oxford Department of Materials.

== Early life and education ==
Bernard was born in Acton, London. As a child Bernard took part in track and field. On graduating high school he was offered a contract by Chelsea F.C., but as they could not guarantee him a position in the team, his mother insisted he attended university. Eventually Bernard studied materials science at Imperial College London. He remained at Imperial College London for his doctoral studies, where he investigated the microstructure of gold.

== Research and career ==
After earning his doctorate Bernard joined the University of Oxford as a postdoctoral researcher, where he studied barrier coatings on flexible substrates. He was eventually promoted to Associate Director of Research in Nanocomposites, where he was responsible for directing the scientific strategy as well as establishing relationships with industry. In 2000 Henry started working on transparent conductors for polymer solar cells. In recognition of his services to materials science, the Society of Vacuum Coaters offer the AIMCAL-SVC academic scholarship.

== Personal life ==
Alongside his academic research, Bernard was a sportsman. Amongst his sporting exploits, he was an elite runner and a member of the Thames Valley Harriers. He served as a coach to both the cricket and athletics blues, Oxford's elite sporting team. He also served as the mentor to the Wolfson College Boat Club. Bernard was committed to improving access to sports, and, inspired by a trip to the United States, arranged the annual Oxfordshire Street Olympix in Didcot. In honour of the Bernard, the Wolfson College Boat Club has two skulls Dr. Bernard Henry.

== Select publications ==
- Roberts, A. P.; Henry, B. M.; Sutton, A. P.; Grovenor, C. R. M.; Briggs, G. A. D.; Miyamoto, T.; Kano, M.; Tsukahara, Y.; Yanaka, M. (2002-10-01). "Gas permeation in silicon-oxide/polymer (SiOx/PET) barrier films: role of the oxide lattice, nano-defects and macro-defects". Journal of Membrane Science. 208 (1): 75–88. doi:10.1016/S0376-7388(02)00178-3. ISSN 0376-7388.
- Erlat, A. G; Henry, B. M; Ingram, J. J; Mountain, D. B; McGuigan, A; Howson, R. P; Grovenor, C. R. M; Briggs, G. A. D; Tsukahara, Y (2001-06-01). "Characterisation of aluminium oxynitride gas barrier films". Thin Solid Films. 388 (1): 78–86. Bibcode:2001TSF...388...78E. doi:10.1016/S0040-6090(01)00836-7. ISSN 0040-6090.
- Erlat, Ahmet G.; Henry, Bernard M.; Grovenor, Chris R. M.; Briggs, Andrew G. D.; Chater, Richard J.; Tsukahara, Yusuke (2004-01-01). "Mechanism of Water Vapor Transport through PET/AlOxNy Gas Barrier Films". The Journal of Physical Chemistry B. 108 (3): 883–890. doi:10.1021/jp036244y. ISSN 1520-6106.
- Barkhouse, D. Aaron R.; Bishop, Hugh E.; Henry, Bernard M.; Webster, Graham R.; Burn, Paul L.; Assender, Hazel E. (2010-04-01). "Improving efficiency of MEH-PPV/TiO2 solar cells by lithium salt modification". Organic Electronics. 11 (4): 649–657. doi:10.1016/j.orgel.2010.01.005. ISSN 1566-1199.
