= Yurii Gun'ko =

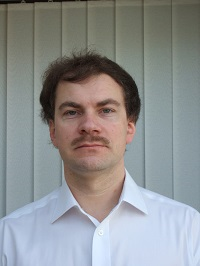
- Born: USSR
- Citizenship: Belarus
- Education: Moscow State University
- Known for: Nanotechnology; Quantum Dots
- Scientific career
- Fields: Chemistry
- Workplaces: Trinity College Dublin

Yurii Gun'ko (Russian: Юрий Гунько), born in USSR, is a Belarusian scientist, professor of Inorganic Chemistry at School of Chemistry of Trinity College Dublin (Dublin, Ireland), and head of the International Research and Education Centre for Physics of Nanostructures.

== Education ==
Yurii Gun'ko graduated from Moscow State University in 1987. In 1990 he received Ph.D. in Inorganic Chemistry degree from Moscow State University.

== Career ==
| Year | Position/Research area | Affiliation |
|---|---|---|
| 1993-1994 | Postdoctoral Fellow (Royal Society Award): research on organolanthanides with professor M.F. Lappert | University of Sussex (UK) |
| 1994-1995 | Senior Lecturer in Chemistry and Materials for Electronics | Belarusian National Technical University |
| 1995-1996 | Postdoctoral Fellow (Alexander von Humboldt Award): research on organosilicon compounds | University of Magdeburg (Germany) |
| 1996-1998 | Postdoctoral Researcher: research on organolanthanides (EPSRC) | University of Sussex |
| 1999-2007 | Lecturer in Inorganic Chemistry | Trinity College Dublin |
| 2007–present | Professor of Inorganic Chemistry | Trinity College Dublin |
| 2011–present | Head of Inorganic and Synthetic Materials Chemistry | Trinity College Dublin |
| 2014–present | Head of the laboratory | International research and education center for physics of nanostructures of ITMO University |

== Publications ==
Yurii Gun'ko has over 268 publications in peer-reviewed journals and 10 patents. His h-index is 51.

== Awards ==
| Date | Award |
|---|---|
| 1993 | Royal Society Fellowship Award |
| 1995 | Alexander von Humboldt Award |
| 2008 | Enterprise Ireland Industrial Technologies Commercialisation Award |
| 2019 | Member of the Royal Irish Academy |

== Research areas ==
Gun'ko has expertise in the areas of inorganic chemistry, science of materials and nanotechnology. His main research interests and activities include magnetic nanoparticles and magnetic fluids for MRI applications; metallasiloxanes; functionalisation of carbon nanotubes; and quantum dots for biomedical applications. The research focuses on the synthesis and characterisation of functional materials and nano-materials.

== See also ==
- Graphene
- Nanostructures
