= M-MTDATA =

4,4',4"-Tris(N-3-methylphenyl-N-phenylamino)triphenylamine

Names
- Other names: m-MTDATA

Identifiers
CAS Number	124729-98-2
3D model (JSmol)	Interactive image
ChemSpider	9236890
ECHA InfoCard	100.159.616
PubChem CID	11061735
CompTox Dashboard (EPA)	DTXSID40453692
- InChI: InChI=1S/C57H48N4/c1-43-16-13-25-55(40-43)59(46-19-7-4-8-20-46)52-34-28-49(29-35-52)58(50-30-36-53(37-31-50)60(47-21-9-5-10-22-47)56-26-14-17-44(2)41-56)51-32-38-54(39-33-51)61(48-23-11-6-12-24-48)57-27-15-18-45(3)42-57/h4-42H,1-3H3 Key: DIVZFUBWFAOMCW-UHFFFAOYSA-N
- SMILES: CC1=CC(=CC=C1)N(C2=CC=CC=C2)C3=CC=C(C=C3)N(C4=CC=C(C=C4)N(C5=CC=CC=C5)C6=CC=CC(=C6)C)C7=CC=C(C=C7)N(C8=CC=CC=C8)C9=CC=CC(=C9)C

Properties
Chemical formula	C_{57}H_{48}N_{4}
Molar mass	789.02
Appearance	White or yellow powder, crystals
Melting point	194-203°C 210°C

Hazards
- GHS labelling
Pictograms	(GHS07: Exclamation mark)
Signal word	Warning
Hazard statements	H315, H319, H335
Precautionary statements	P261, P264, P271, P280, P302+P352, P305+P351+P338
- Except where otherwise noted, data are given for materials in their standard state (at 25 °C [77 °F], 100 kPa). Infobox references

m-MTDATA - whose full name is 4,4',4"-Tris(N-3-methylphenyl-N-phenyl-amino) triphenylamine - is an organic molecule belonging to the class of starburst molecules, often used as a material for the production of organic electronic devices. It is particularly appreciated for its hole-transporting ability and is widely used in OLED and other optoelectronic technologies.

== Electronic properties ==
In terms of electronic properties, m-MTDATA has a HOMO (Highest Occupied Molecular Orbital) level of 5.1 eV and a LUMO (Lowest Unoccupied Molecular Orbital) level of 2.0 eV. Its relatively high HOMO level favors efficient hole transport, making it a material with an affinity for efficient acceptance and transport of positive charges. The molecule is also characterized by a conjugated structure that facilitates electron delocalization.

== Applications ==
Being a material that exhibits good thermal stability as well as low ionization energy, m-MTDATA is an organic electronic material widely used in various optoelectronic devices. Its main application is in OLEDs, where it is employed as a hole transporting layer.

The efficiency of m-MTDATA in optoelectronic devices can be improved by combining it with other electron transport molecules or by optimizing its chemical properties through structural modifications. An example of this is the combined use with a strong electron acceptor such as F4-TCNQ (2,3,5,6-tetrafluoro-7,7,8,8-tetracyanoquinodimethane), which is able to optimize hole injection. m-MTDATA is also often used in combination with PPT (2,8-Bis(diphenylphosphoryl)-dibenzo[b,d]thiophene), another compound employed to optimize its electronic performance.

From a new materials research perspective, the typical structure of a device including m-MTDATA sees the material deposited on electrodes such as indium tin oxide (ITO), but it can also be applied on noble metal substrates, such as gold, for advanced charge transport studies. m-MTDATA is widely tested in laboratories for its ability to form active films in organic devices, including thin-film solar cells and organic field-effect transistors (OTFTs).

== Security and stability ==
m-MTDATA is stable under normal conditions of temperature and pressure. However, it can degrade under prolonged exposure to elevated temperatures or intense UV radiation. Studies of degradation due to use (simulated with prolonged filler injection) have found a decrease in the performance of m-MTDATA, although to a lesser extent than other polymer semiconductors.

== History ==
Developed in the late 1980s for the production of amorphous molecular materials for use in organic electronic applications, its importance has grown in parallel with the development of organic semiconductor technologies, particularly for the organic LED display industry.
