= Thin-film transistor =

Field-effect transistor device

A thin-film transistor (TFT) is a special type of field-effect transistor (FET) where the transistor is made by thin-film deposition. TFTs are grown on a supporting (but non-conducting) substrate, such as glass. This differs from the conventional bulk metal-oxide-semiconductor field-effect transistor (MOSFET), where the semiconductor material typically is the substrate, such as a silicon wafer. The traditional application of TFTs is in TFT liquid-crystal displays.

== Design and manufacture ==
TFTs can be fabricated with a wide variety of semiconductor materials. Because it is naturally abundant and well understood, amorphous or polycrystalline silicon were (and still are) used as the semiconductor layer. However, because of the low mobility of amorphous silicon and the large device-to-device variations found in polycrystalline silicon, other materials have been studied for use in TFTs. These include cadmium selenide, metal oxides such as indium gallium zinc oxide (IGZO) or zinc oxide, organic semiconductors, carbon nanotubes, or metal halide perovskites.

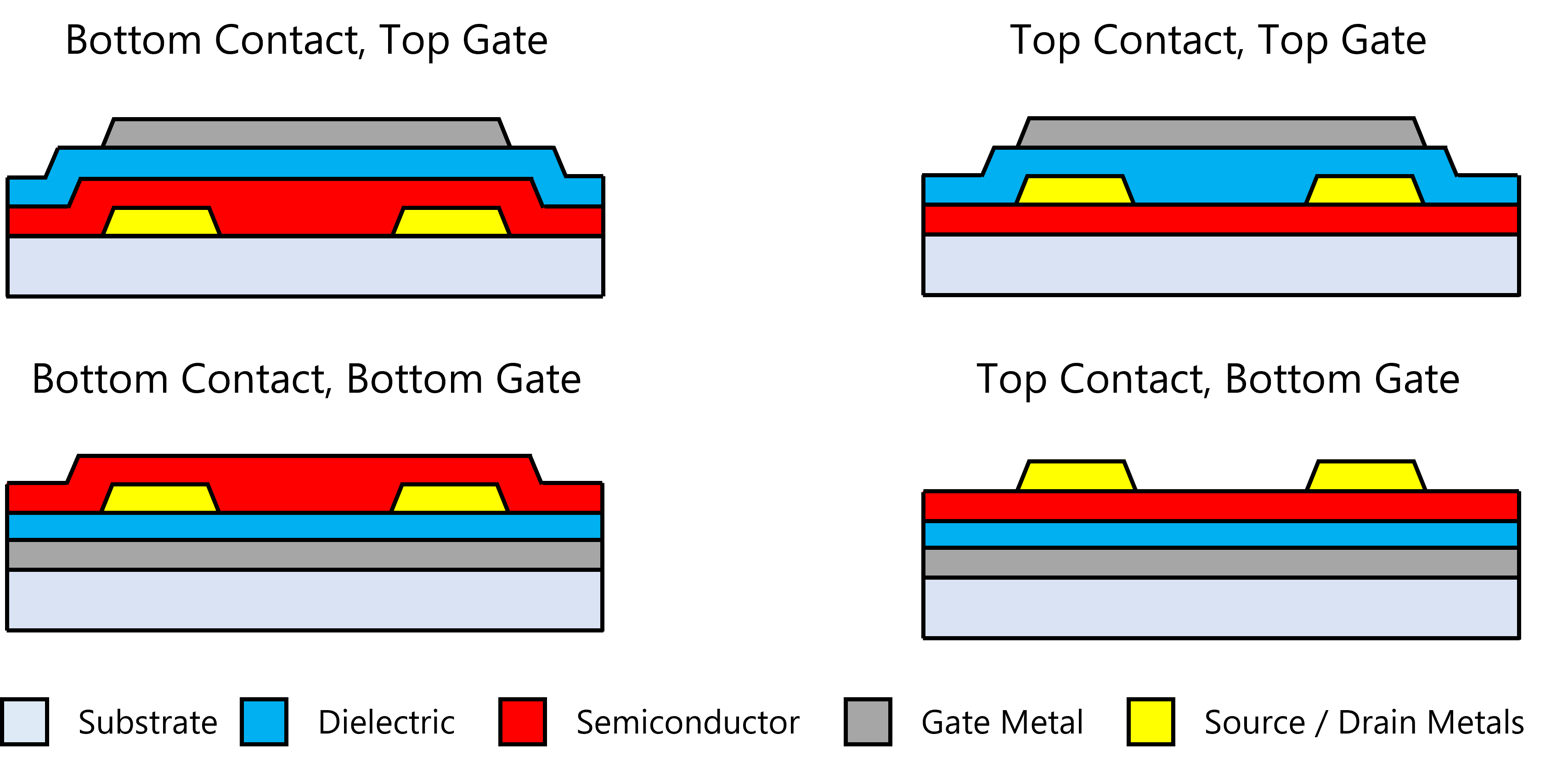
Cross sectional diagram of 4 common thin film transistor structures

Because TFTs are grown on inert substrates, rather than on wafers, the semiconductor must be deposited in a dedicated process. A variety of techniques are used to deposit semiconductors in TFTs. These include chemical vapor deposition (CVD), atomic layer deposition (ALD), and sputtering. The semiconductor can also be deposited from solution, via techniques such as printing or spray coating. Solution-based techniques are hoped to lead to low-cost, mechanically flexible electronics. Because typical substrates will deform or melt at high temperatures, the deposition process must be carried out under relatively low temperatures compared to traditional electronic material processing.

Some wide band gap semiconductors, most notable metal oxides, are optically transparent. By also employing transparent substrates, such as glass, and transparent electrodes, such as indium tin oxide (ITO), some TFT devices can be designed to be completely optically transparent. In 2004, Nomura et al. reported room-temperature fabrication of transparent flexible TFTs using amorphous oxide semiconductors. Such transparent TFTs (TTFTs) could be used to enable head-up displays (such as on a car windshield). The first solution-processed TTFTs, based on zinc oxide, were reported in 2003 by researchers at Oregon State University. The Portuguese laboratory CENIMAT at the Universidade Nova de Lisboa has produced the world's first completely transparent TFT at room temperature. CENIMAT also developed the first paper transistor, which may lead to applications such as magazines and journal pages with moving images.

Many AMOLED displays use LTPO (Low-temperature Poly-Crystalline Silicon and Oxide) TFT transistors. These transistors offer stability at low refresh rates, and variable refresh rates, which allows for power saving displays that do not show visual artifacts. Large OLED displays usually use AOS (amporphous oxide semiconductor) TFT transistors instead, also called oxide TFTs and these are usually based on IGZO.

== Applications ==
The best known application of thin-film transistors is in TFT LCDs, an implementation of liquid-crystal display technology. Transistors are embedded within the panel itself, reducing crosstalk between pixels and improving image stability.

As of 2008, many color LCD TVs and monitors use this technology. TFT panels are frequently used in digital radiography applications in general radiography. A TFT is used in both direct and indirect capture as a base for the image receptor in medical radiography.

As of 2013, all modern high-resolution and high-quality electronic visual display devices use TFT-based active matrix displays.

AMOLED displays also contain a TFT layer for active-matrix pixel addressing of individual organic light-emitting diodes.

The most beneficial aspect of TFT technology is its use of a separate transistor for each pixel on the display. Because each transistor is small, the amount of charge needed to control it is also small. This allows for very fast re-drawing of the display.

== Structure of a TFT-display matrix ==
This picture does not include the actual light-source (usually cold-cathode fluorescent lamps or white LEDs), just the TFT-display matrix.

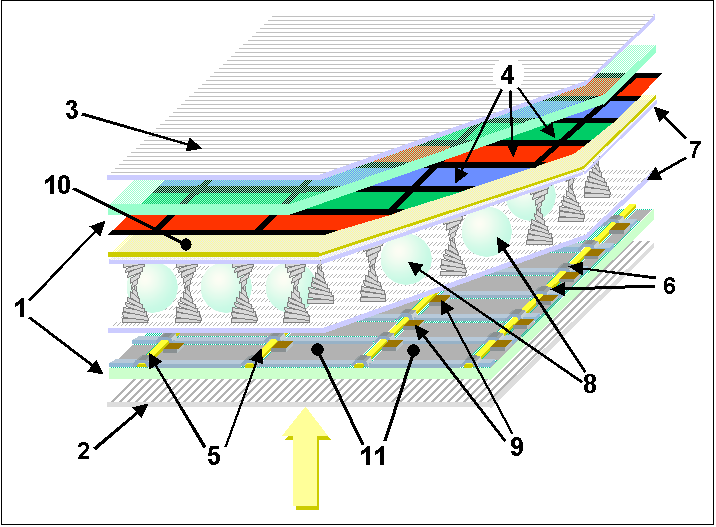
Cut through an TFT display.

- 1 – Glass plates
- 2/3 – Horizontal and vertical polarisers
- 4 – RGB colour mask
- 5/6 – Horizontal and vertical command lines
- 7 – Rubbed polymer layer
- 8 – Spacers
- 9 – Thin-film transistors
- 10 – Front electrode
- 11 – Rear electrodes

== History ==
In February 1957, John Wallmark of RCA filed a patent for a thin film MOSFET in which germanium monoxide was used as a gate dielectric. Paul K. Weimer, also of RCA implemented Wallmark's ideas and developed the thin-film transistor (TFT) in 1962, a type of MOSFET distinct from the standard bulk MOSFET. It was made with thin films of cadmium selenide and cadmium sulfide. In 1966, T.P. Brody and H.E. Kunig at Westinghouse Electric fabricated indium arsenide (InAs) MOS TFTs in both depletion and enhancement modes.

The idea of a TFT-based liquid-crystal display (LCD) was conceived by Bernard J. Lechner of RCA Laboratories in 1968. Lechner, F.J. Marlowe, E.O. Nester and J. Tults demonstrated the concept in 1968 with an 18x2 matrix dynamic scattering LCD that used standard discrete MOSFETs, as TFT performance was not adequate at the time. In 1973, T. Peter Brody, J. A. Asars and G. D. Dixon at Westinghouse Research Laboratories developed a CdSe (cadmium selenide) TFT, which they used to demonstrate the first CdSe thin-film-transistor liquid-crystal display (TFT LCD). The Westinghouse group also reported on operational TFT electroluminescence (EL) in 1973, using CdSe. Brody and Fang-Chen Luo demonstrated the first flat active-matrix liquid-crystal display (AM LCD) using CdSe in 1974, and then Brody coined the term "active matrix" in 1975. However, mass production of this device was never realized, due to complications in controlling the compound semiconductor thin film material properties, and device reliability over large areas.

A breakthrough in TFT research came with the development of the amorphous silicon (a-Si) TFT by P.G. le Comber, W.E. Spear and A. Ghaith at the University of Dundee in 1979. They reported the first functional TFT made from hydrogenated a-Si with a silicon nitride gate dielectric layer. The a-Si TFT was soon recognized as being more suitable for large-area AM LCD. This led to commercial research and development (R&D) of AM LCD panels based on a-Si TFTs in Japan.

By 1982, pocket TVs based on AM LCD technology were developed in Japan. In 1982, Fujitsu's S. Kawai fabricated an a-Si dot-matrix display, and Canon's Y. Okubo fabricated a-Si twisted nematic (TN) and guest-host LCD panels. In 1983, Toshiba's K. Suzuki produced a-Si TFT arrays compatible with CMOS (complementary metal–oxide–semiconductor) integrated circuits (ICs), Canon's M. Sugata fabricated an a-Si color LCD panel, and a joint Sanyo and Sanritsu team including Mitsuhiro Yamasaki, S. Suhibuchi and Y. Sasaki fabricated a 3-inch a-SI color LCD TV.

The first commercial TFT-based AM LCD product was the 2.1-inch Epson ET-10 (Epson Elf), the first color LCD pocket TV, released in 1984. In 1986, a Hitachi research team led by Akio Mimura demonstrated a low-temperature polycrystalline silicon (LTPS) process for fabricating n-channel TFTs on a silicon-on-insulator (SOI), at a relatively low temperature of 200 °C. A Hosiden research team led by T. Sunata in 1986 used a-Si TFTs to develop a 7-inch color AM LCD panel, and a 9-inch AM LCD panel. In the late 1980s, Hosiden supplied monochrome TFT LCD panels to Apple Computer. In 1988, a Sharp research team led by engineer T. Nagayasu used hydrogenated a-Si TFTs to demonstrate a 14-inch full-color LCD, which convinced the electronics industry that LCD would eventually replace cathode-ray tube (CRT) as the standard television display technology. The same year, Sharp launched TFT LCD panels for notebook PCs. In 1992, Toshiba and IBM Japan introduced a 12.1-inch color SVGA panel for the first commercial color laptop by IBM.

TFTs can also be made out of indium gallium zinc oxide (IGZO). TFT-LCDs with IGZO transistors first showed up in 2012, and were first manufactured by Sharp Corporation. IGZO allows for higher refresh rates and lower power consumption. In 2021, the first flexible 32-bit microprocessor was manufactured using IGZO TFT technology on a polyimide substrate.

== See also ==
- Metal oxide thin film transistor
- Organic field effect transistor
