= QTC =

QTC may refer to:

- Quantum Tunneling Composite
- QTc, a time measurement of a portion of a heartbeat
- Queensland Theological College
- Queensland Turf Club
- Quinnipiac tribal council
- The radio Q code for a pending message count
