= Guest-host display =

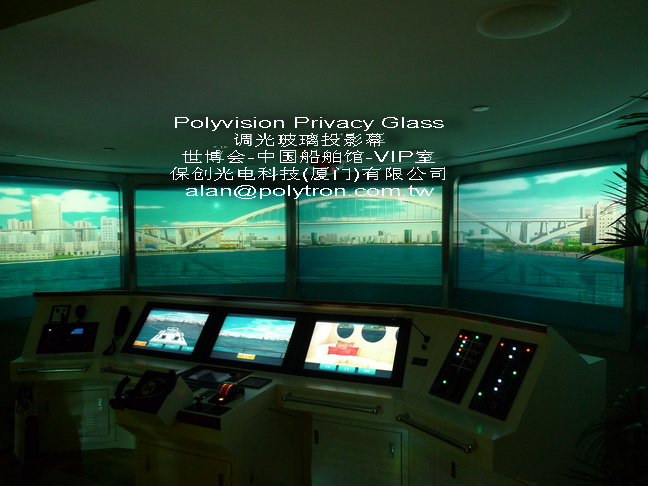
Polytron-Polyvision privacy glass in Shanghai Expo

A guest-host display, also known as a dichroic display and a polymer-dispersed display, are displays similar to liquid-crystal displays but which also include polymers, inorganic particles, or dichroic dye within the liquid crystal matrix.

== Overview ==
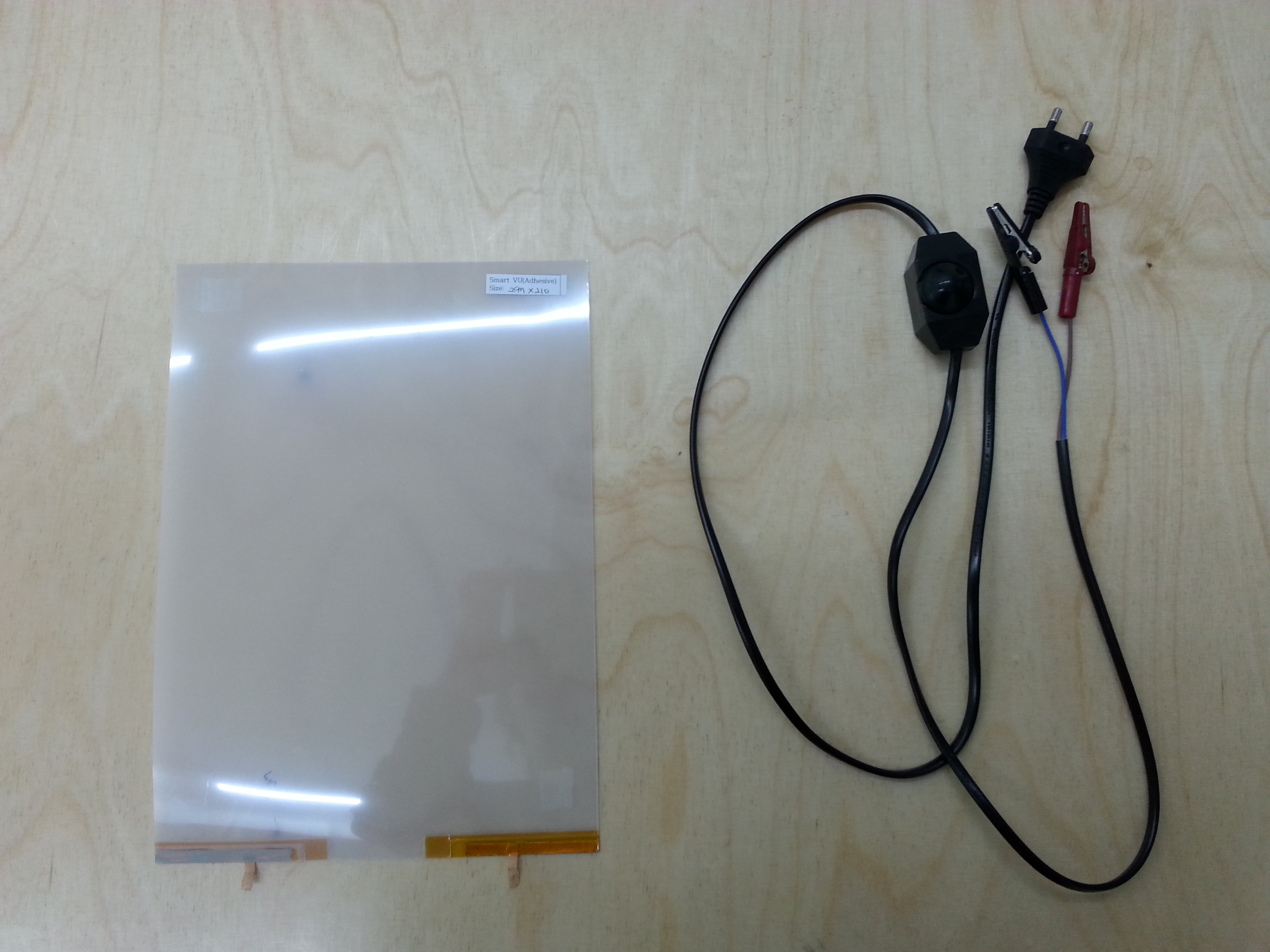
VITSWELL PDLC FILM

In dichroic dye displays, as the birefringence of the host liquid crystals change from planar to perpendicular orientation, the guest dyes also change orientation, from absorbing / planar orientation, to non-absorbing / perpendicular orientation.

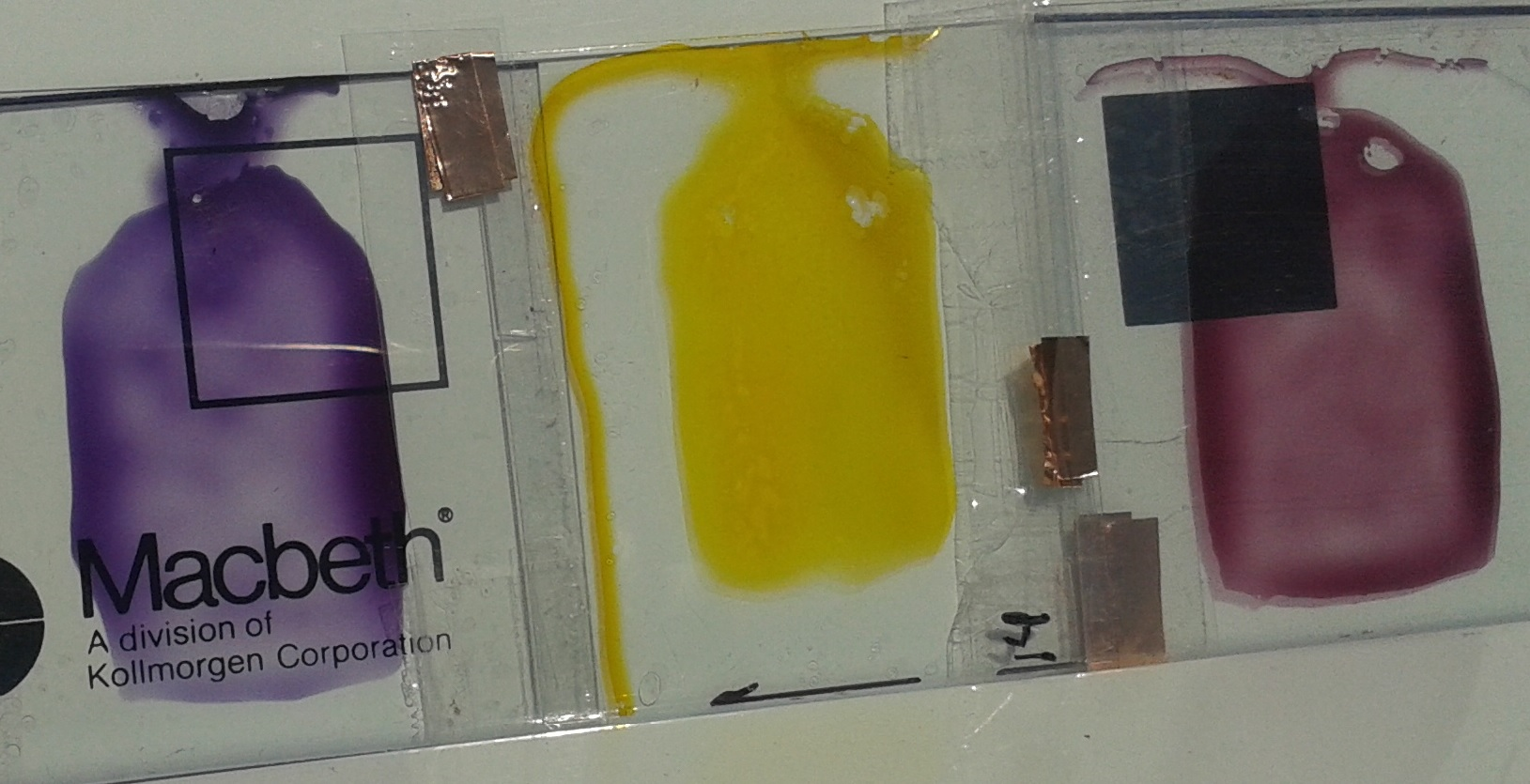
Prototype dichroic displays, photo by PPI

Unlike common TN (Twisted Nematic) or STN (Super Twisted Nematic) liquid crystal displays, guest host displays are typically driven direct, and are not usually multiplex driven.

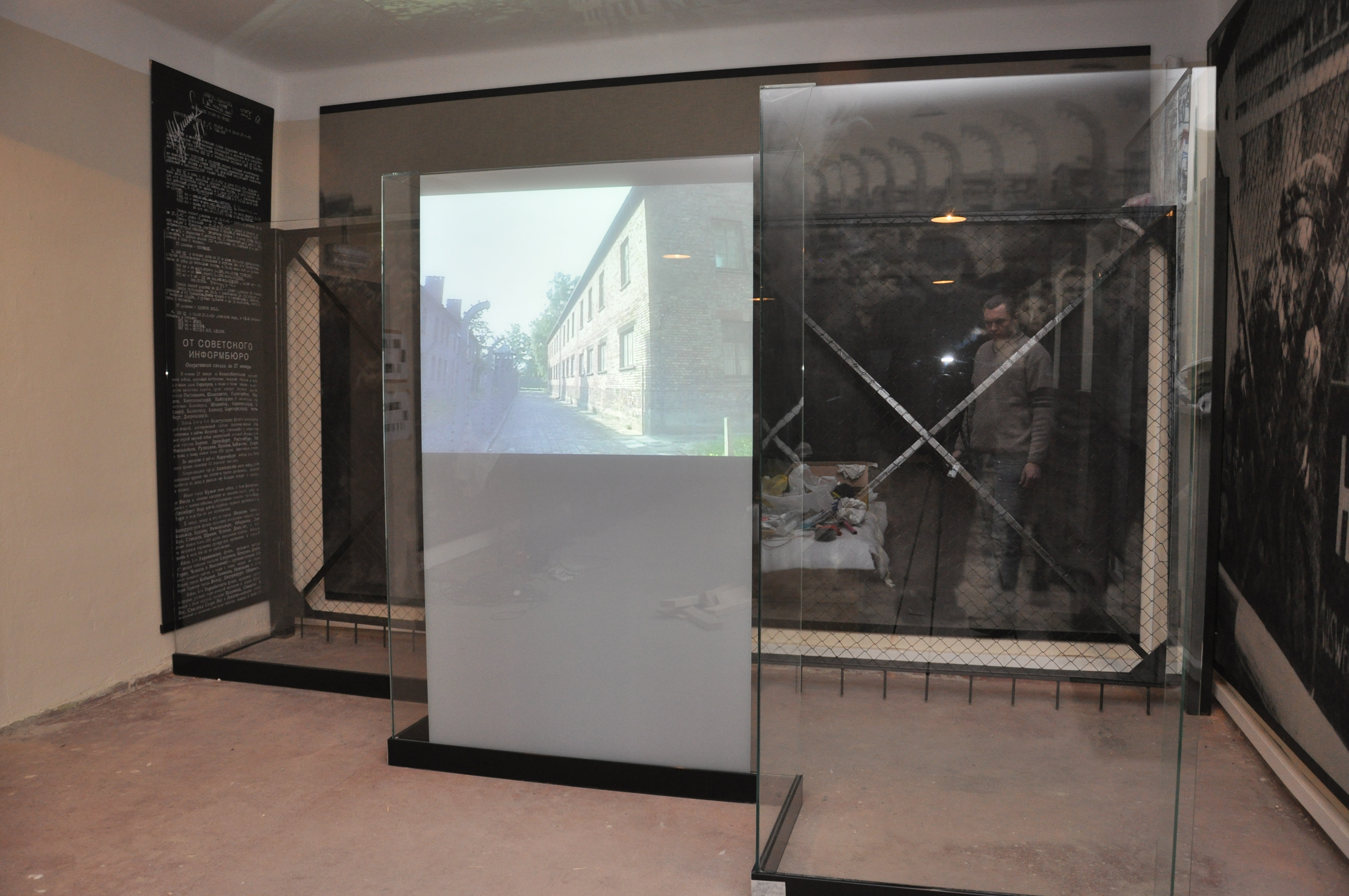
Shtiever 11.01.10 2

In addition, guest host displays usually require higher operating voltages than TN or STN displays. For example, the polymer dispersed liquid crystal display (also called a P.D.L.C. display), is usually operated at voltages from 4.5 V to 24 V to as high as 100 V. Similarly, dichroic dye containing guest host displays, require voltages from 4.5 V to 10 V and higher.

However, the P.D.L.C. display and many dichroic dye containing guest host displays, such as the White-Taylor Phase Change display, do not require polarizers, which is a significant advantage over TN or STN displays. Lacking polarizers these displays commonly have lower contrast than TN or STN displays, But are often sunlight readable, and usually have no backlight, and hence no backlight glare.

Polarizer free displays enable low cost devices, since the polarizer is one of the more expensive components comprising the common liquid crystal display.

Lacking polarizers, the guest host display substrates can be manufactured from low cost birefringent plastic films. And the plastic film substrates enable additional economies such as continuous R2R manufacturing (Roll to Roll manufacturing) of the displays, with its inherent economies over batch manufacturing processes.

Continuous manufacturing of displays is described in U.S. Patents 4,228,574, 4,924,243, 4,094,058, and patents pending.

In some cases, the R2R manufacturing of the guest host displays can be integrated with other roll to roll manufacturing process. For example, automated pick and place machines, such as a rotary circuit board placement machine from M.G.S. or a linear actuator, VonWeise actuator, with bulk tube feeders from M.M.T.F., U.I.C.T.F., T.F., can automate the placement of driver circuit boards and other components.

Advances in A.C.A. and A.C.F. conductive adhesives further enable the automated assembly of displays.

Recent advances in transparent conductive polythiophene coated substrates make display electrodes which resist cracking and breaking, unlike common oxide based transparent conductors.

Advances in Nanoimprint Lithography (N.I.L.) enable precise micro scale and nano scale embossing of display spacers, gaskets, and edge seals R2R. Processes similar to N.I.L. are described in U.S. Patents 5,544,582, 5,365,356, 5,268,782, 5,539,5454,720,173, 5,559621, and patents pending.

Dr. Ernest Lueder teaches that "...(SiOx and Ormocer coated plastic films have O2 and H2O permeations) sufficiently low for maintaining a proper operation of the most sensitive FLCD cells."

Flexible substrates also enable greater design flexibility for the product designer, allowing flexible, conformal, die cut displays which complement the overall product design.

R2R manufacturing of displays is promoted by the non-profit FlexTech Alliance, the non-profit Organic Electronics Association, and R2R intelligent packaging is promoted by the A.I.P.I.A.. Academic research and development is currently being done at the Glenn H. Brown Liquid Crystal Institute at Kent State University, at the Arizona State University Flexible Display Center, at the University of Florida CREOL College of Optics and Photonics, at the VTT Technical Research Centre, at Tohoku University, at the Liquid Crystal Group of the University of Hamburg, and at the University of Stuttgart Institute for Large Area Microelectronics.

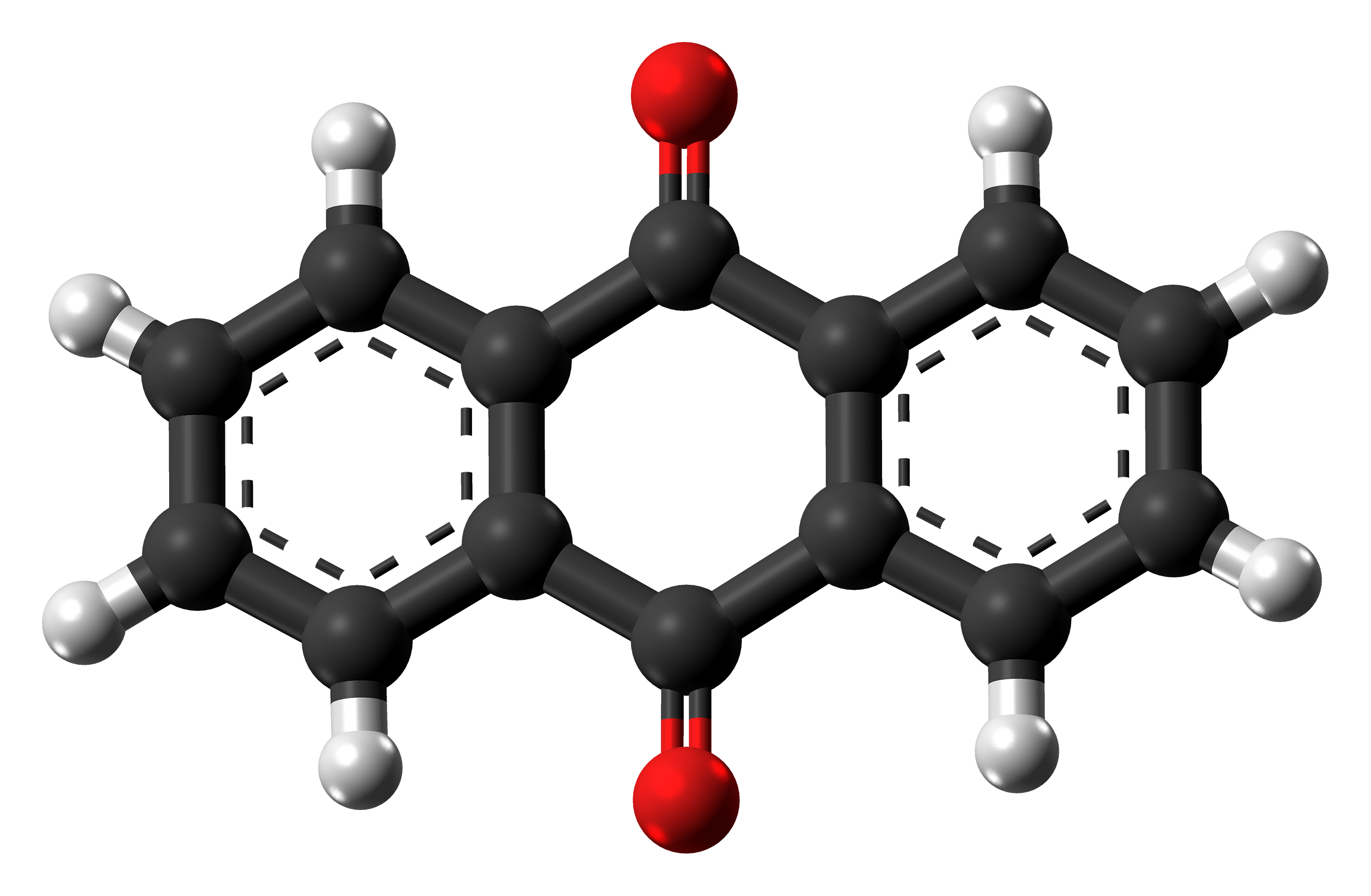
Anthraquinone-3D-balls

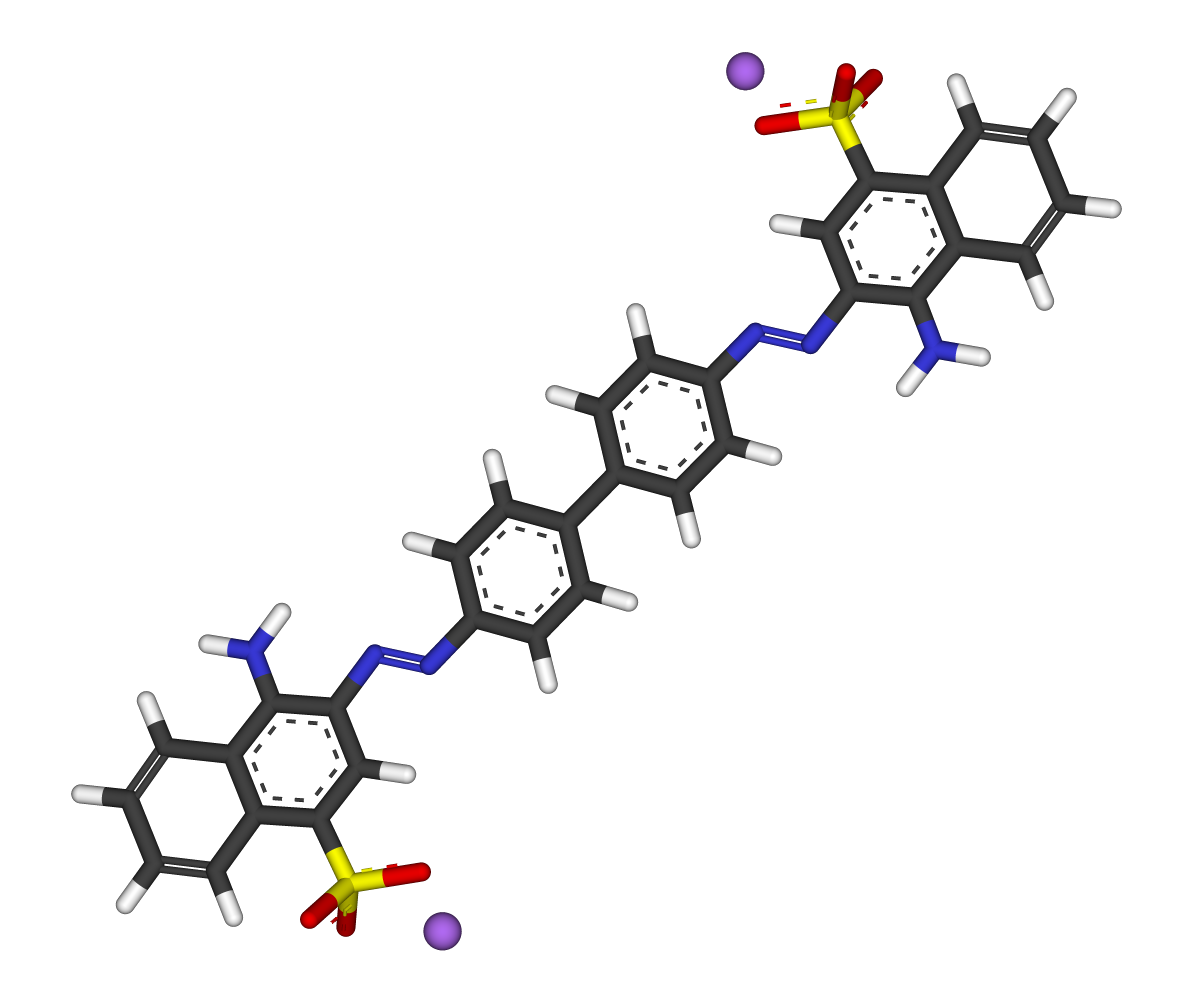
Congo-red-3D-sticks

Guest host displays consume electrical current much more slowly than l.e.d.s (light emitting diodes), giving them operating life spans of several months, versus the short lifespans of battery operated l.e.d.s.

P.D.L.C. displays are commonly used as privacy glass in homes, offices, and vehicles. Dichroic displays had been extensively researched as robust avionics for aircraft. Both P.D.L.C. Displays and dichroic displays can function as colorful animated skins for consumer products such as mylar balloons and greeting cards.

L. to R., 100g vial of commodity liquid crystal, red cholesteric, green cholesteric, 5g vial of 55AEA liquid crystal, 25g vial of 811 cholesteric twist agent, in foreground, aluminum oxide guest, lc from Yancheng Smiling (CN)

Guest host displays commonly comprise liquid crystals, polymer or inorganic additives, twist agent, and optionally, dichroic dyes. Liquid crystals are distributed by Merck (DE), Yangcheng Smiling (CN), and Phentex Corporation (US, CN). Dichroic dyes are distributed by Yamamoto Chemicals. Displays are manufactured by Polytronix (US, TW, CN), DreamGlass Group (ES), Shenzhen Santech (CN), P.P.I. (US), Vitswell (CN), Transicoil (US), and by many others.

Magic Sky Control Using SPD-SmartGlass Technology
