= Charge modulation spectroscopy =

Charge modulation spectroscopy is an electro-optical spectroscopy technique tool. It is used to study the charge carrier behavior of organic field-effect transistors. It measures the charge introduced optical transmission variation by directly probing the accumulation charge at the burning interface of semiconductor and dielectric layer where the conduction channel forms.

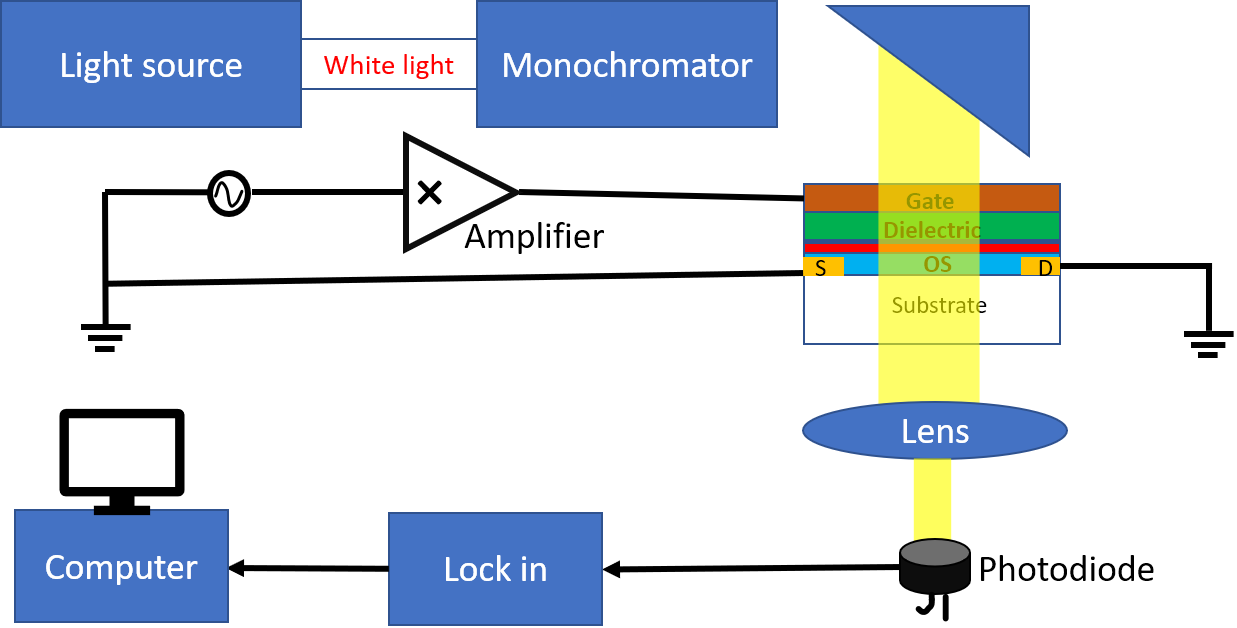
Block diagram of charge modulation spectroscopy setup. Here the photo diode measures the transmission. A direct current plus alternating current signal is applied to the organic field-effect transistor, the AC will be as the reference frequency for the Lock-in Amplifier.

== Principles ==
Unlike ultraviolet–visible spectroscopy which measures absorbance, charge modulation spectroscopy measures the charge introduced optical transmission variation. In other words, it reveals the new features in optical transmission introduced by charges. In this setup, there are mainly four components: lamp, monochromator, photodetector and lock-in amplifier. Lamp and monochromator are used for generating and selecting the wavelength. The selected wavelength passes through the transistor, and the transmitted light is recorded by the Photodiode. When the signal to noise ratio is very low, the signal can be modulated and recovered with a Lock-in amplifier.

In the experiment, a direct current plus an alternating current bias are applied to the organic field-effect transistor. Charge carriers accumulate at the interface between the dielectric and the semiconductor (usually a few nanometers). With the appearance of the accumulation charge, the intensity of the transmitted light changes. The variation of the light intensity (§ Bleaching and Charge absorption signal) is then collected though the photodetector and lock-in amplifier. The charge modulation frequency is given to Lock-in amplifier as the reference.

== Modulate charge at the organic field-effect transistor ==
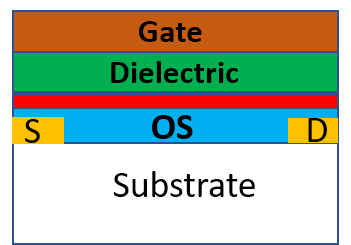
Organic Field Effect Transistor: the red layer represents the accumulation charge located at the interface of the dielectric and organic semiconductor.

There are four typically Organic field-effect transistor architectures: Top-gate, bottom-contacts; bottom-gate, top-contacts; bottom-gate, bottom-contacts; top-gate, top-contact.

In order to create the accumulation charge layer, a positive/negative direct current voltage is applied to the gate of the organic field-effect transistor (positive for the P type transistor, negative for the N type transistor). In order to modulate the charge, an AC voltage is given between the gate and source. It is important to notice that only mobile charge can follow the modulation and that the modulation frequency given to lock-in amplifier has to be synchronous.

== Charge modulation spectra ==
The charge modulation spectroscopy signal can be defined as the differential transmission $\bigtriangleup T$divided by the total transmission $T$. By modulating the mobile carriers, an increase transmission $\bigtriangleup T/T>0$ and decrease transmission $\bigtriangleup T/T<0$ features could be both observed. The former relates to the bleaching and the latter to the charge absorption and electrically induced absorption (electro-absorption). The charge modulation spectroscopy spectra is an overlap of charge-induced and electro-absorption features. In transistors, the electro-absorption is more significant during the high voltage drop. There are several ways to identify the electro-absorption contribution, such as get the second harmonic $\bigtriangleup T/T$, or probe it at the depletion region.

=== Bleaching and charge absorption ===
When the accumulation charge carrier removes the ground state of the neutral polymer, there is more transmission in the ground state. This is called bleaching $\bigtriangleup T > 0$. With the excess hole or electrons at the polymer, there will be new transitions at low energy levels, therefore the transmission intensity is reduced $\bigtriangleup T < 0$, this is related to charge absorption.

=== Electro-absorption ===
The electro-absorption is a type of Stark effect in the neutral polymer, it is predominant at the electrode edge since there is a strong voltage drop. Electro-absorption can be observed from the second harmonic charge modulation spectroscopy spectra.

== Charge modulation microscopy ==
Charge modulation microscopy is a new technology which combines the confocal microscopy with charge modulation spectroscopy. Unlike the charge modulation spectroscopy which is focused on the whole transistor, the charge modulation microscopy give us the local spectra and map. Thanks for this technology, the channel spectra and electrode spectra can be obtained individually. A more local dimension of charge modulation spectra (around submicrometer) can be observed without a significant Electro-absorption feature. Of course, this depends on the resolution of the optical microscopy.

The high resolution of charge modulation microscopy allows mapping of the charge carrier distribution at the active channel of the organic field-effect transistor. In other words, a functional carrier morphology can be observed. It is well known that the local carrier density can be related to the polymer microstructure. Based on Density functional theory calculations, a polarized charge modulation microscopy can selectively map the charge transport associated with a relative direction of the transition dipole moment. The local direction can be correlated to the orientational order of polymer domains. More ordered domains show a high carrier mobility of the organic field-effect transistor device.

== See also ==
- Confocal microscopy
- Organic field-effect transistor
- Stark effect
- Ultraviolet–visible spectroscopy
