= Quantum tunnelling composite =

Type of composite materials

Quantum tunnelling composites (QTCs) are composite materials of metals and non-conducting elastomeric binder, used as pressure sensors. They use quantum tunnelling: without pressure, the conductive elements are too far apart to conduct electricity; when pressure is applied, they move closer and electrons can tunnel through the insulator. The effect is far more pronounced than would be expected from classical (non-quantum) effects alone, as classical electrical resistance is linear (proportional to distance), while quantum tunnelling is exponential with decreasing distance, allowing the resistance to change by a factor of up to 10^{12} between pressured and unpressured states.

Quantum tunneling composites hold multiple designations in specialized literature, such as: conductive/semi-conductive polymer composite, piezo-resistive sensor and force-sensing resistor (FSR). However, in some cases Force-sensing resistors may operate predominantly under percolation regime; this implies that the composite resistance grows for an incremental applied stress or force.

== Introduction ==
QTCs were discovered in 1996 by technician David Lussey while he was searching for a way to develop an electrically conductive adhesive. Lussey founded Peratech Ltd, a company devoted to research work and usage of QTCs. Peratech Ltd. and other companies are working on developing quantum tunneling composite to improve touch technology. Currently, there is restricted use of QTC due to its high cost, but eventually this technology is expected to become available to the general user. Quantum tunneling composites are combinations of polymer composites with elastic, rubber-like properties elastomer, and metal particles (nickel). Due to a no-air gap in the sensor contamination or interference between the contact points is impossible. There is also little to no chance of arcing, electrical sparks between contact points. In the QTC's inactive state, the conductive elements are too far from one another to pass electron charges. Thus, current does not flow when there is no pressure on the quantum-tunneling composite. A characterization of a QTC is its spiky silicon covered surface. The spikes do not actually touch, but when a force is applied to the QTC, the spikes move closer to each other and a [quantum] effect occurs as a high concentration of electrons flow from one spike tip to the next. The electric current stops when the force is taken away.

== Types ==
QTCs come in different forms and each form is used differently but has a similar resistance change when deformed. QTC pills are the most commonly used type of QTC. Pills are pressure sensitive variable resistors. The amount of electric current passed is exponentially proportionate to the amount of pressure applied. QTC pills can be used as input sensors which respond to an applied force. These pills can also be used in devices to control higher currents than QTC sheets. QTC sheets are composed of three layers: a thin layer of QTC material, a conductive material and a plastic insulator. QTC sheets allow a quick switch from high to low resistance and vice versa.

== Applications ==
In February 2008 the newly formed company QIO Systems Inc gained, in a deal with Peratech, the worldwide exclusive license to the intellectual property and design rights for the electronics and textile touchpads based on QTC technology and for the manufacture and sale of ElekTex (QTC-based) textile touchpads for use in both consumer and commercial applications.

QTCs were used to provide fingertip sensitivity in NASA's Robonaut in 2012. Robonaut was able to survive and send detailed feedback from space. The sensors on the human-like robot were able to tell how hard and where it was gripping something.

Quantum tunneling composites are relatively new and are still being researched and developed. QTC has been implemented within clothing to make “smart”, touchable membrane control panels to control electronic devices within clothing, e.g. mp3 players or mobile phones. This allows equipment to be operated without removing clothing layers or opening fastenings and makes standard equipment usable in extreme weather or environmental conditions such as Arctic/Antarctic exploration or spacesuits.

The following are possible uses of QTCs:

- Sporting materials such as training dummies or fencing jackets can be covered in QTC material. Sensors on the material can relay information on the force of an impact.
- Mirror and window operation such as gesture, stroke, or swipe can be used in automotive applications. Depending on the amount of pressure applied from the gesture, the car parts will adjust to the desired setting at either a fast speed or a slow speed. The more pressure is applied, the faster the operation will be.
- Blood pressure cuffs: QTCs in blood pressure cuffs reduce inaccurate readings from improper cuff attachment. The sensors tell how much tension is needed to read a person's blood pressure.
