= Organic field-effect transistor =

Type of field-effect transistor

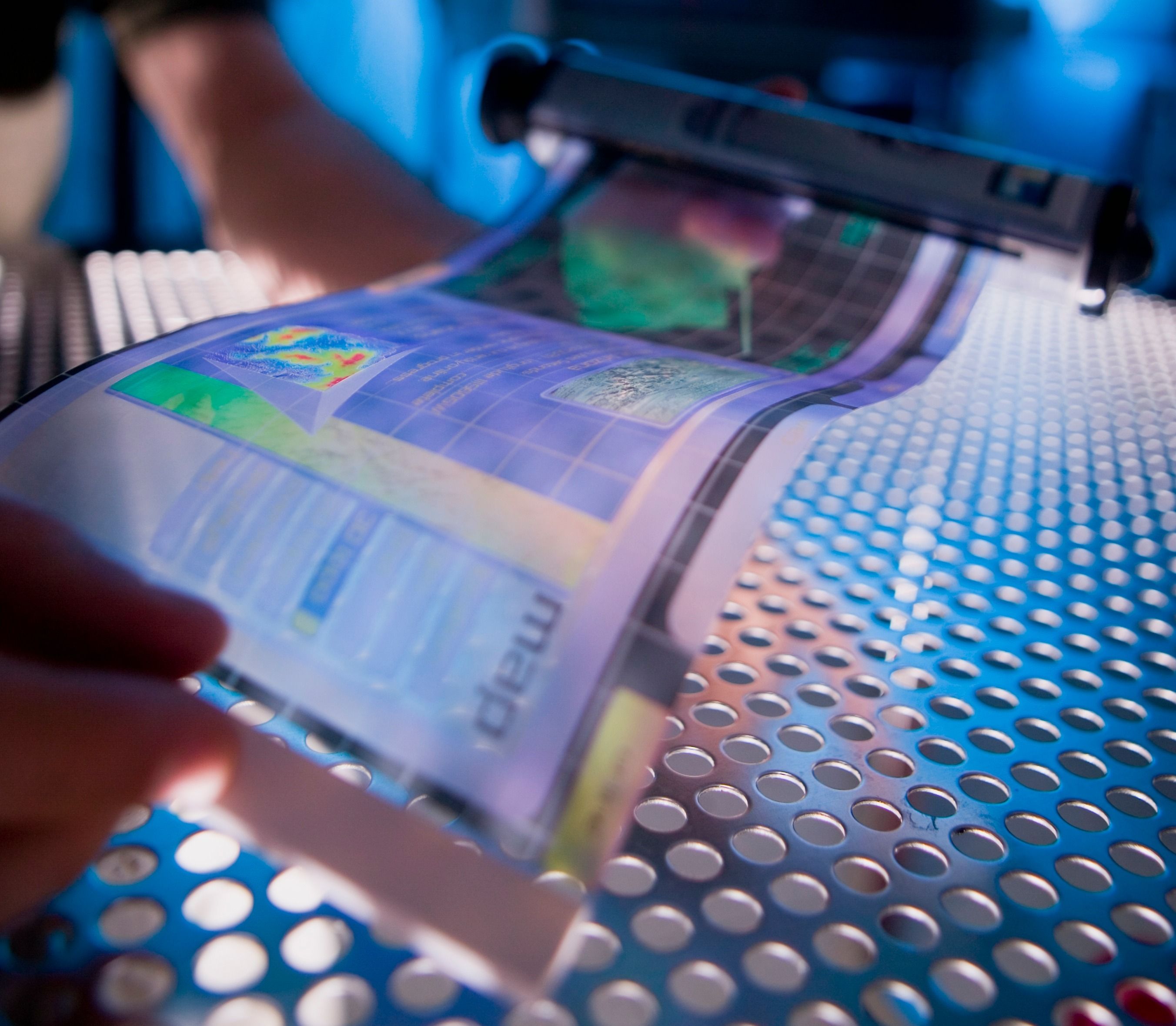
OFET-based flexible display

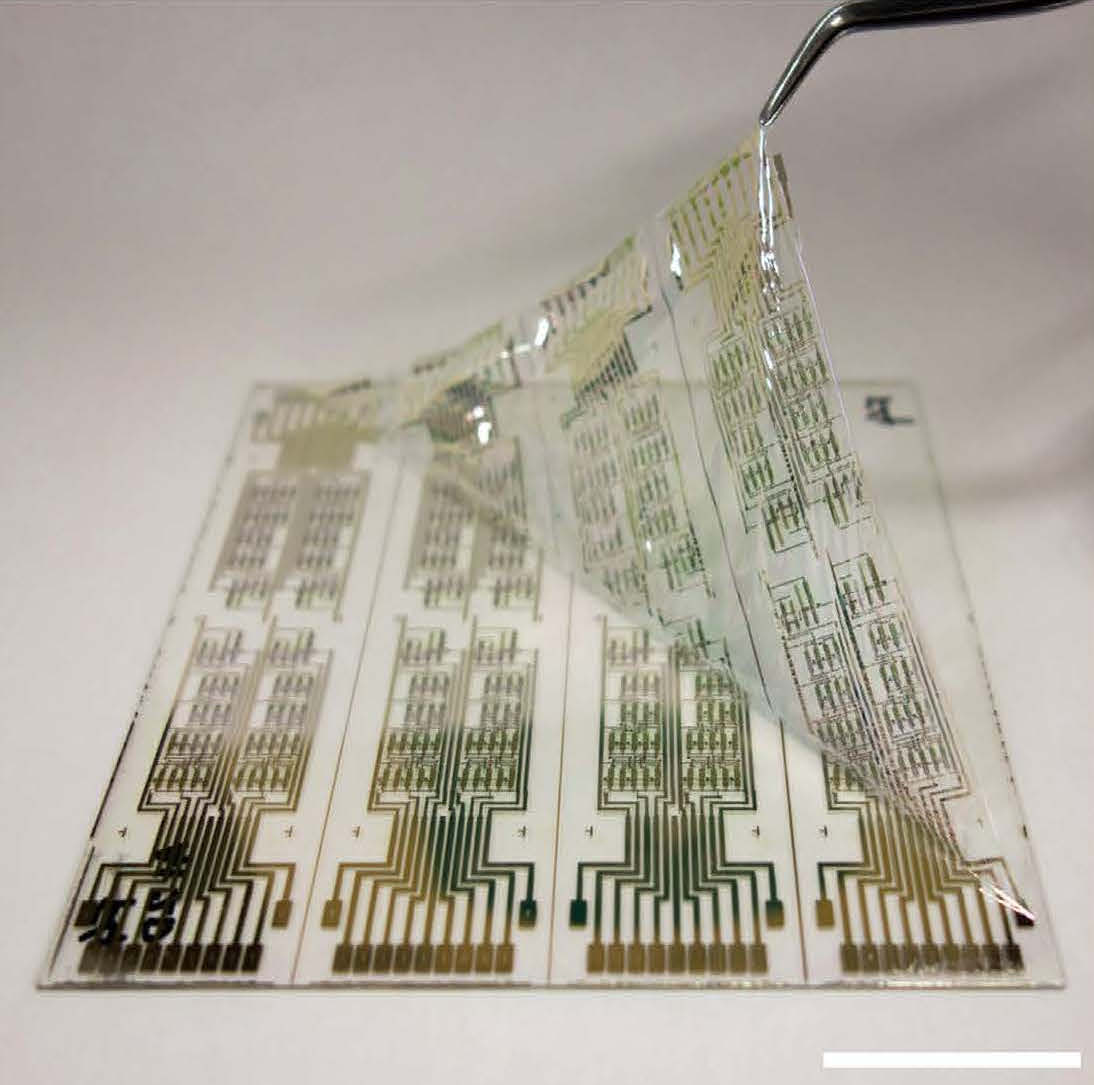
Organic CMOS logic circuit. Total thickness is less than 3 μm. Scale bar: 25 mm

An organic field-effect transistor (OFET) is a field-effect transistor using an organic semiconductor in its channel. OFETs can be prepared either by vacuum evaporation of small molecules, by solution-casting of polymers or small molecules, or by mechanical transfer of a peeled single-crystalline organic layer onto a substrate. These devices have been developed to realize low-cost, large-area electronic products and biodegradable electronics. OFETs have been fabricated with various device geometries. The most commonly used device geometry is bottom gate with top drain and source electrodes, because this geometry is similar to the thin-film silicon transistor (TFT) using thermally grown SiO_{2} as gate dielectric. Organic polymers, such as poly(methyl-methacrylate) (PMMA), can also be used as dielectric. One of the benefits of OFETs, especially compared with inorganic TFTs, is their physical flexibility, which invite biocompatible applications.

As of 2025, OFETs have achieved some niche applications.

== History ==
In 1986, Mitsubishi Electric researchers H. Koezuka, A. Tsumura and Tsuneya Ando reported the first organic field-effect transistor, based on a polymeric form of thiophene. The polythiophene, as well as related polymers, is a type of conjugated polymer that is able to conduct charge, akin to metal oxide semiconductors. Some OFETs are based on the thin-film transistor (TFT) model..

== Materials ==
One common feature of OFET materials is the inclusion of an aromatic or otherwise conjugated π-electron system, facilitating the delocalization of orbital wavefunctions. Electron withdrawing groups or donating groups can be attached that facilitate hole or electron transport.

OFETs employing many aromatic and conjugated materials as the active semiconducting layer have been reported, including small molecules such as rubrene, tetracene, pentacene, diindenoperylene, perylenediimides, tetracyanoquinodimethane (TCNQ), and polymers such as polythiophenes (especially poly(3-hexylthiophene) (P3HT)), polyfluorene, polydiacetylene, poly(2,5-thienylene vinylene), poly(p-phenylene vinylene) (PPV).

The field is very active, with newly synthesized and tested compounds reported weekly in prominent research journals. Many review articles exist documenting the development of these materials.

Rubrene-based OFETs show the highest carrier mobility 20–40 cm^{2}/(V·s). Another popular OFET material is pentacene, which has been used since the 1980s, but with mobilities 10 to 100 times lower (depending on the substrate) than rubrene. The major problem with pentacene, as well as many other organic conductors, is its rapid oxidation in air to form pentacene-quinone. However if the pentacene is preoxidized, and the thus formed pentacene-quinone is used as the gate insulator, then the mobility can approach the rubrene values. This pentacene oxidation technique is akin to the silicon oxidation used in the silicon electronics.

Polycrystalline tetrathiafulvalene and its analogues result in mobilities in the range 0.1–1.4 cm^{2}/(V·s). However, the mobility exceeds 10 cm^{2}/(V·s) in solution-grown or vapor-transport-grown single crystalline hexamethylene-tetrathiafulvalene (HMTTF). The ON/OFF voltage is different for devices grown by those two techniques, presumably due to the higher processing temperatures using in the vapor transport grows.

All the above-mentioned devices are based on p-type conductivity. N-type OFETs are yet poorly developed. They are usually based on perylenediimides or fullerenes or their derivatives, and show electron mobilities below 2 cm^{2}/(V·s).

== Device preparation ==
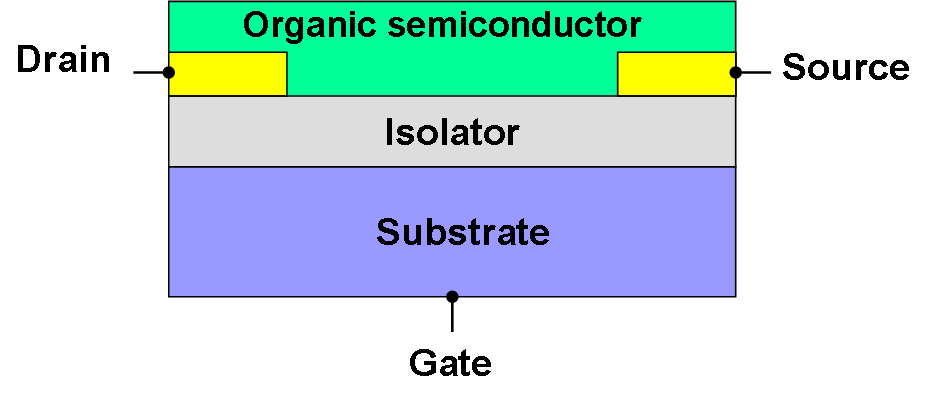
OFET schematic

Thermally oxidized silicon is a traditional substrate for OFETs where the silicon dioxide serves as the gate insulator. The active FET layer is usually deposited onto this substrate using either (i) thermal evaporation, (ii) coating from organic solution, or (iii) electrostatic lamination. The first two techniques result in polycrystalline active layers; they are much easier to produce, but result in relatively poor transistor performance. Numerous variations of the solution coating technique (ii) are known, including dip-coating, spin-coating, inkjet printing and screen printing. The electrostatic lamination technique is based on manual peeling of a thin layer off a single organic crystal; it results in a superior single-crystalline active layer, yet it is more tedious. The thickness of the gate oxide and the active layer is below one micrometer.

== Carrier transport ==
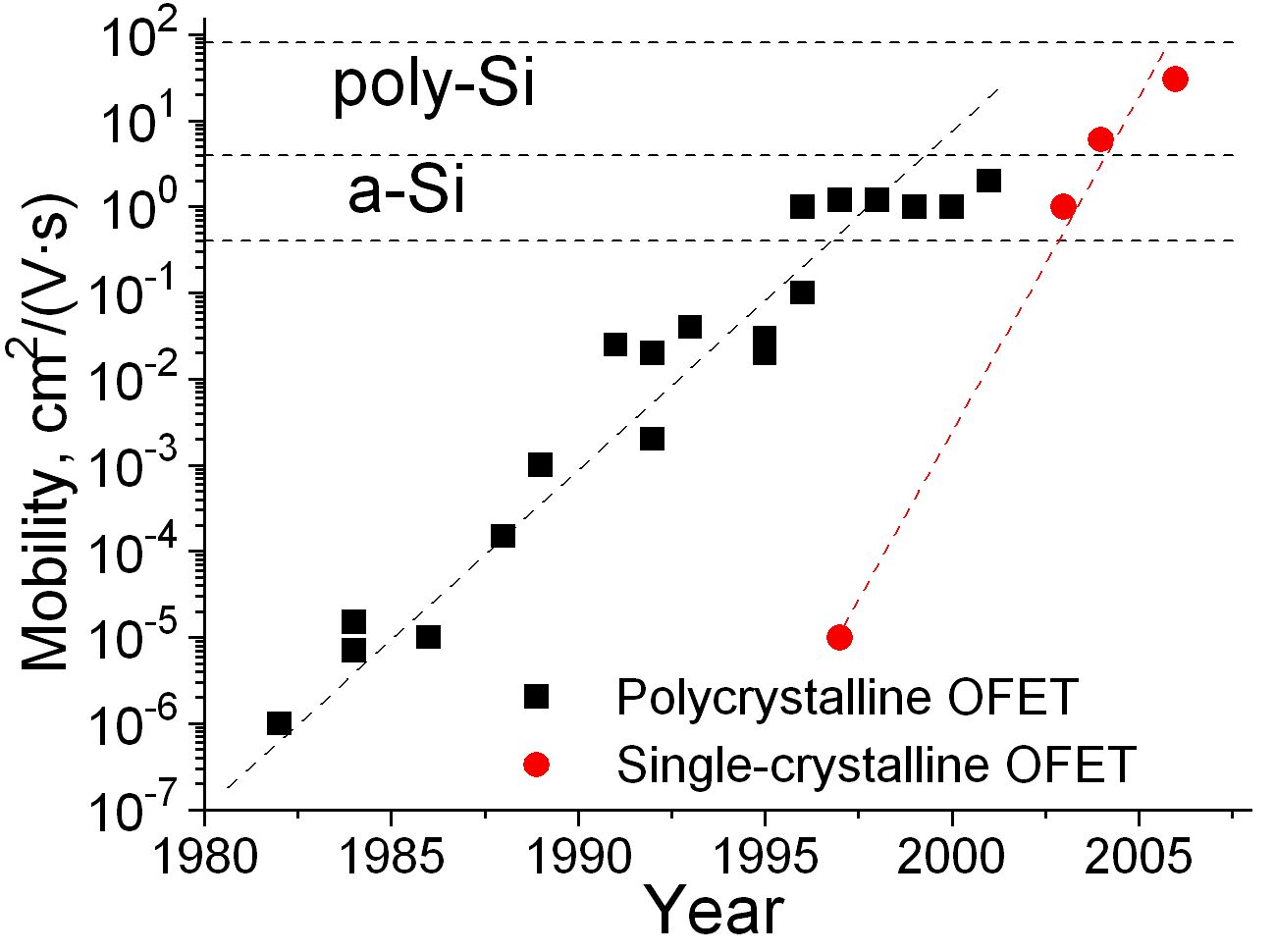
Evolution of carrier mobility in organic field-effect transistor

OFETs adopt the architecture of thin-film transistors (TFT). With the development of the conducting polymer, the semiconducting properties of small conjugated molecules have been recognized. The interest in OFETs has grown enormously in the past ten years. The reasons for this surge of interest are manifold. The performance of OFETs, which can compete with that of amorphous silicon (a-Si) TFTs with field-effect mobilities of 0.5–1 cm^{2} V^{−1} s^{−1} and ON/OFF current ratios (which indicate the ability of the device to shut down) of 10^{6}–10^{8}, has improved significantly. Currently, thin-film OFET mobility values of 5 cm^{2} V^{−1} s^{−1} in the case of vacuum-deposited small molecules and 0.6 cm^{2} V^{−1} s^{−1} for solution-processed polymers have been reported. As a result, there is now a greater industrial interest in using OFETs for applications that are currently incompatible with the use of a-Si or other inorganic transistor technologies. One of their main technological attractions is that all the layers of an OFET can be deposited and patterned at room temperature by a combination of low-cost solution-processing and direct-write printing, which makes them ideally suited for realization of low-cost, large-area electronic functions on flexible substrates.

The carrier transport in OFET is specific for two-dimensional (2D) carrier propagation through the device. Various experimental techniques were used for this study, such as Haynes - Shockley experiment on the transit times of injected carriers, time-of-flight (TOF) experiment for the determination of carrier mobility, pressure-wave propagation experiment for probing electric-field distribution in insulators, organic monolayer experiment for probing orientational dipolar changes, optical time-resolved second harmonic generation (TRM-SHG), etc. Whereas carriers propagate through polycrystalline OFETs in a diffusion-like (trap-limited) manner, they move through the conduction band in the best single-crystalline OFETs.

The most important parameter of OFET carrier transport is carrier mobility. Its evolution over the years of OFET research is shown in the graph for polycrystalline and single crystalline OFETs. The horizontal lines indicate the comparison guides to the main OFET competitors – amorphous (a-Si) and polycrystalline silicon. The graph reveals that the mobility in polycrystalline OFETs is comparable to that of a-Si whereas mobility in rubrene-based OFETs (20–40 cm^{2}/(V·s)) approaches that of best poly-silicon devices.

Development of accurate models of charge carrier mobility in OFETs is an active field of research. Fishchuk et al. have developed an analytical model of carrier mobility in OFETs that accounts for carrier density and the polaron effect.

While average carrier density is typically calculated as function of gate voltage when used as an input for carrier mobility models, modulated amplitude reflectance spectroscopy (MARS) has been shown to provide a spatial map of carrier density across an OFET channel.

== Light-emitting OFETs ==
Because an electric current flows through such a transistor, it can be used as a light-emitting device, thus integrating current modulation and light emission. In 2003, a German group reported the first organic light-emitting field-effect transistor (OLET). The device structure comprises interdigitated gold source- and drain electrodes and a polycrystalline tetracene thin film. Both positive charges (holes) as well as negative charges (electrons) are injected from the gold contacts into this layer leading to electroluminescence from the tetracene.

== See also ==
- Charge modulation spectroscopy
- OLED
- Organic electronics
- Oxide thin-film transistor
- Thin film transistor
