= Oxide thin-film transistor =

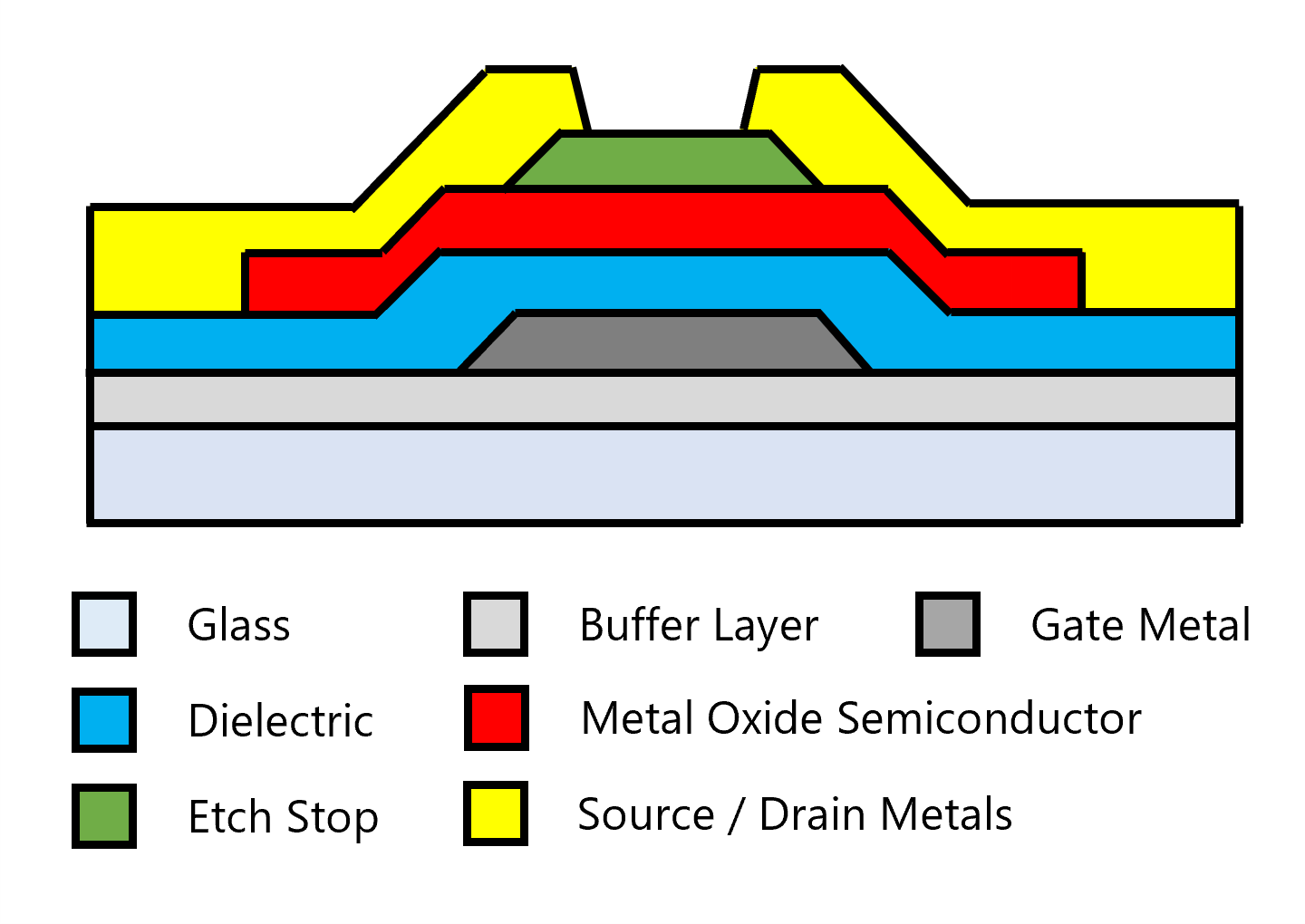
Cross sectional diagram of typical metal oxide thin film transistor. In this case the "oxide" refers to the semiconducting layer between the source and drain electrodes.

An oxide thin-film transistor (oxide TFT) or metal oxide thin film transistor is a type of thin film transistor where the semiconductor is a metal oxide compound. An oxide TFT is distinct from a metal oxide field effect transistor (MOSFET) where the word "oxide" refers to the insulating gate dielectric (normally silicon dioxide). In an oxide TFT, the word oxide refers to the semiconductor. Oxide TFTs have applications as amplifiers to deliver current to emitters in display backplanes.

== History ==
The first transistor employing a metal oxide as the semiconductor was reported in 1964 by Klasens and Koelmans at Philips Research Laboratories. However, oxide TFTs were seldom considered again for several decades after this. It wasn't until the early 2000's that Hideo Hosono, who was studying transparent conducting oxides, discovered that oxysulfides and indium gallium zinc oxide could be used as semiconductors in TFTs. Soon after, John Wager at Oregon State University reported oxide TFTs employing the binary oxide zinc oxide as the semiconductor.

== Properties ==
Oxides have several properties which make them desirable over hydrogenated amorphous silicon (a-Si:H), which was the incumbent TFT technology in the early 2000's. Firstly, the electron mobility is roughly 100 times higher in oxide TFTs. Because the source-drain current in transistors is linearly proportional to electron mobility, so too are the amplification properties. The result of this is that smaller transistors can be used to provide the same current. In a display this means that a higher resolution and switching speed is possible.

a-Si:H additionally suffers from issues with environmental stability, such as the Staebler-Wronski Effect. As oxides are already oxidized, they are generally more environmentally stable, however they do experience a phenomenon called Negative Bias Illumination Stress (NBIS) where the threshold voltage changes under constant illumination.

Most n-type (electron transporting) oxide TFTs employ semiconductors that have a wide bandgap; generally greater than 3 eV. For this reason they are attractive for use in fully transparent electronics. Their wide bandgap also means they have a low off-current, and hence a high on/off ratio; a desirable property for well-defined on- and off-states.

One significant drawback with oxide TFTs is that there are very few p-type (hole transporting) metal oxide semiconductors. While not a significant problem when providing amplification to emitters, this does mean oxide semiconductors are less suitable for complementary logic, and hence information processing.

== Growth ==
Metal oxide semiconductors are typically deposited using sputtering, a vacuum-based growth technique resulting in an amorphous or polycrystalline layer. Oxides can also be deposited from solution, such as via spin-coating or spray coating.

== Commercial use ==
Several companies have adopted oxide TFTs as a platform for display drivers. Notably Sharp in 2012, and Apple in 2013.
