= Electrically conductive adhesive =

Type of glue used in electronics

An electrically conductive adhesive is a glue that is primarily used for electronics.

The electric conductivity is caused by a component that makes ca. 80% of the total mass of an electrically conductive adhesive. This conductive component is suspended in a sticky component that holds the electrically conductive adhesive together. The particles of the conductive component are in contact to each other and in this way make electric current possible.

== Composition ==
The conductive component can be silver, nickel, copper or graphite. Other conductive materials are possible but unusual. The adhesive component can be a varnish, synthetic resin, or silicone. Variations in conductive component's type and concentration change the resistivity of the adhesive. A typical silver-based conductive adhesive such as that made by Electrolube contains ingredients in the following proportions:

Silver	30-60%
1-Ethoxypropan-2-ol	10-30%
Ethanol	10-30%
Acetone	5-10%
Ethyl acetate	1-5%

They are specifically formulated in paste (micro-particles) for use in scanning electron microscopy (SEM) and other electron optical applications find use in producing or repairing printed circuit board (PCB) tracks, to paint-on an electrical screen, or to make electrical connections to non-solderable surfaces.

== Applications ==
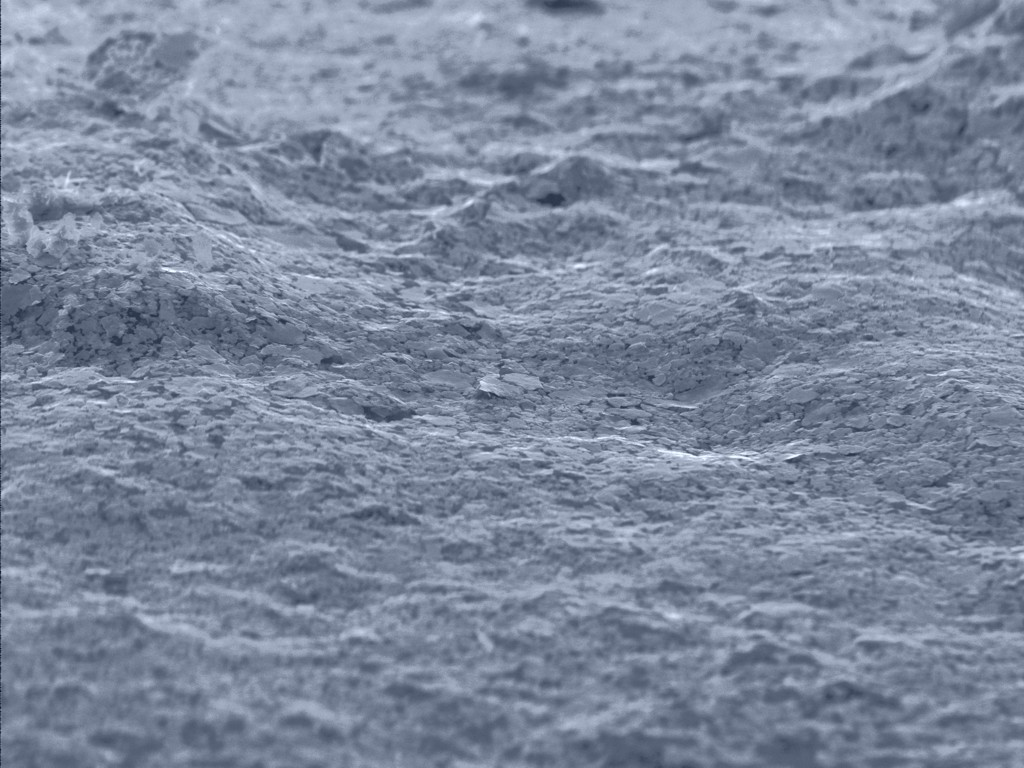
Conductive silver, SEM image. Visible width of picture is 434μm.

- One could fix a defective conductor on a printed circuit board using an electrically conductive adhesive. In the same way, one could fix a defective rear windscreen heater on a car using an electrically conductive adhesive.
- If just a small current is needed, a temperature-sensitive electronic element can be electrically connected to a circuit using an electrically conductive adhesive instead of soldering.
- Electrically conductive adhesives can be used to paint the inner surface of plastic boxes containing electronic devices. This makes a Faraday cage saving the internal components from electromagnetic radiation.
- Electrically conductive adhesives are used in SEM to fix and ground the sample to avoid electrostatic charging of the surface.
