= Cholesteryl chloride =

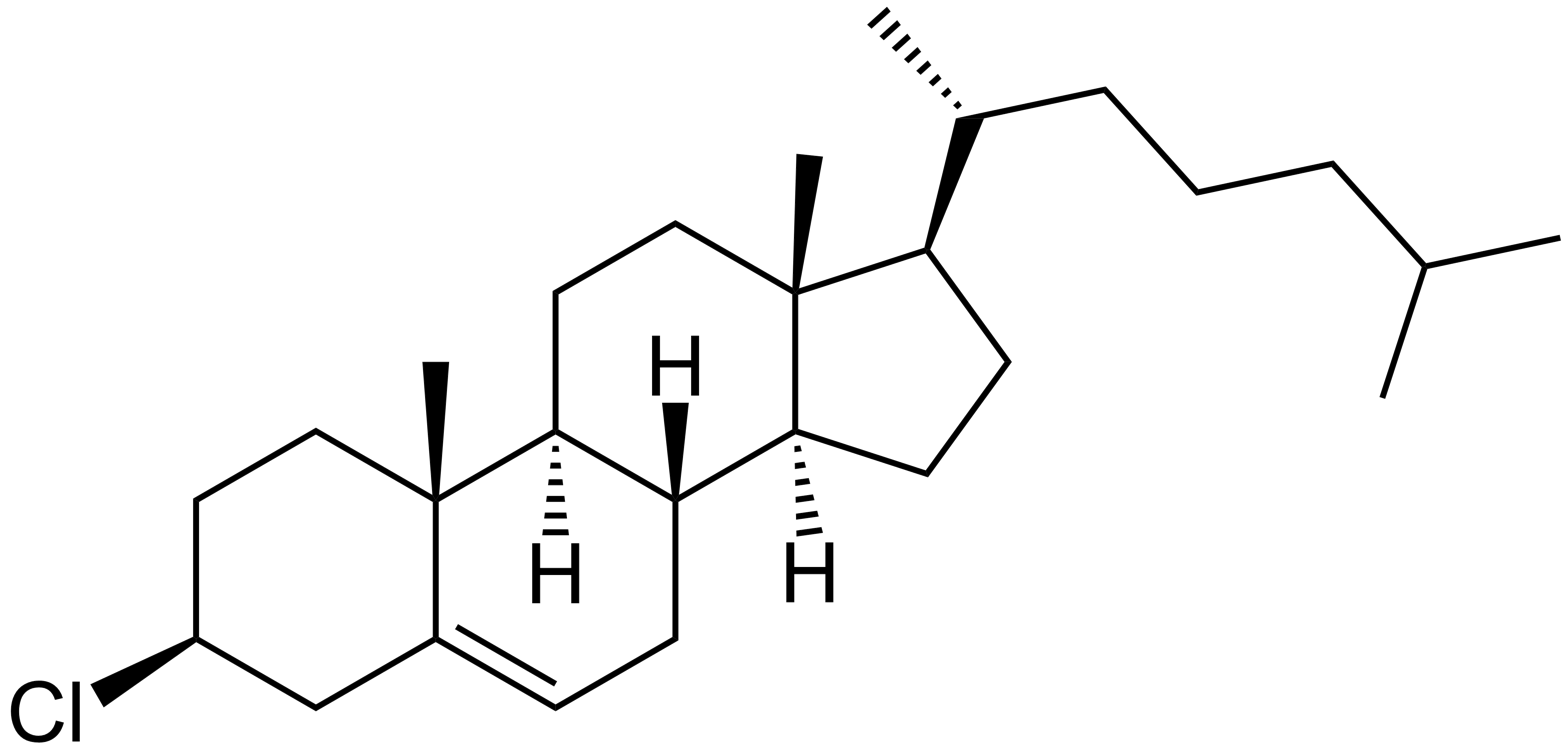

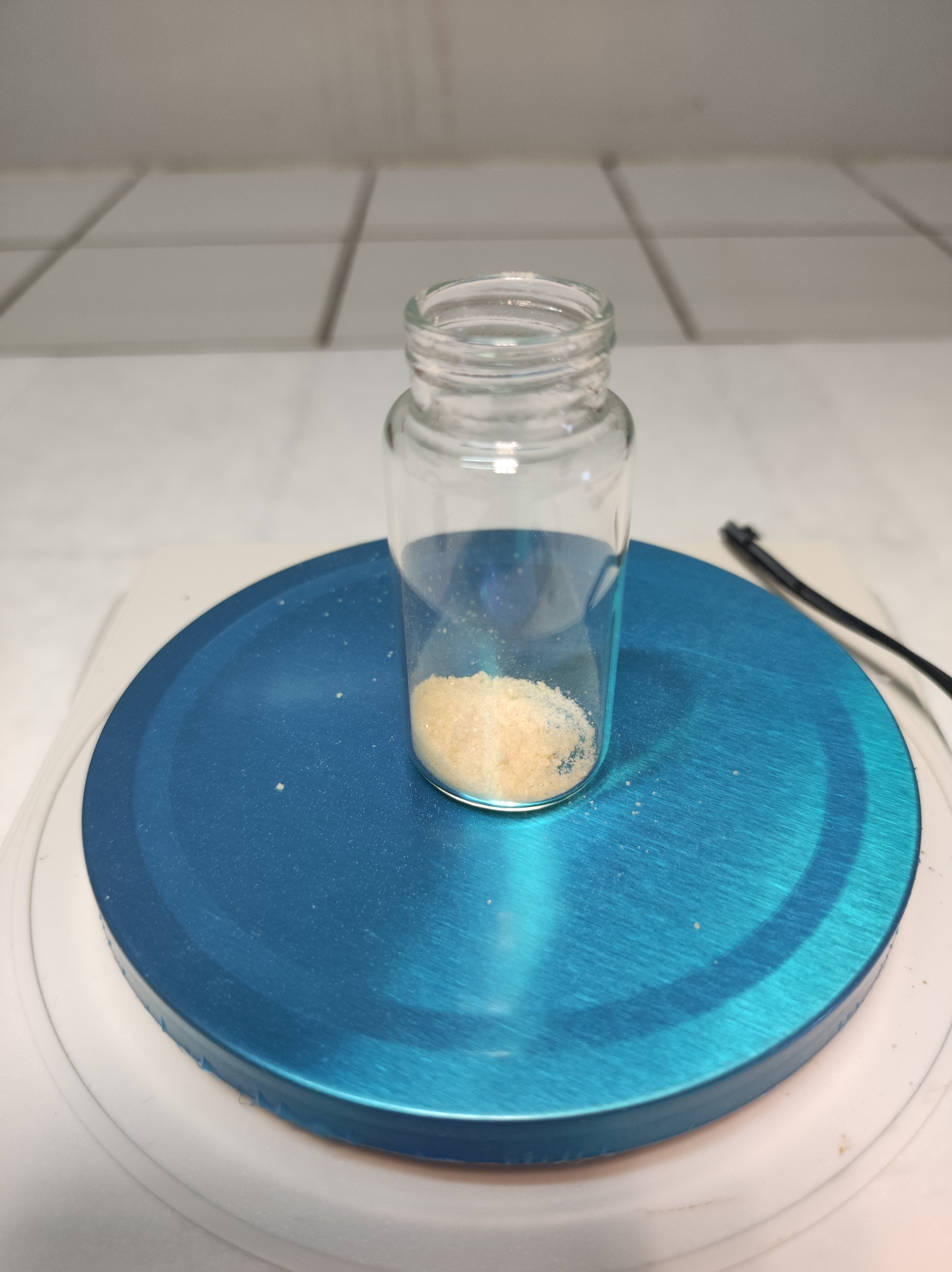

Names
- IUPAC name 3β-Chlorocholest-5-ene
- Systematic IUPAC name (1R,3aS,3bS,7S,9aR,9bS,11aR)-7-Chloro-9a,11a-dimethyl-1-[(2R)-6-methylheptan-2-yl]-2,3,3a,3b,4,6,7,8,9,9a,9b,10,11,11a-tetradecahydro-1H-cyclopenta[a]phenanthrene
- Other names 3-Chlorocholest-5-ene

Identifiers
CAS Number	910-31-6
3D model (JSmol)	Interactive image; Interactive image
ChemSpider	16498751
DrugBank	DB14045
ECHA InfoCard	100.011.823
EC Number	213-004-4
PubChem CID	92850
UNII	39EHZ05V39
CompTox Dashboard (EPA)	DTXSID90883602
- InChI: InChI=1S/C27H45Cl/c1-18(2)7-6-8-19(3)23-11-12-24-22-10-9-20-17-21(28)13-15-26(20,4)25(22)14-16-27(23,24)5/h9,18-19,21-25H,6-8,10-17H2,1-5H3/t19-,21?,22+,23-,24+,25+,26+,27-/m1/s1 Key: OTVRYZXVVMZHHW-FNOPAARDSA-N; InChI=1/C27H45Cl/c1-18(2)7-6-8-19(3)23-11-12-24-22-10-9-20-17-21(28)13-15-26(20,4)25(22)14-16-27(23,24)5/h9,18-19,21-25H,6-8,10-17H2,1-5H3/t19-,21+,22+,23-,24+,25+,26+,27-/m1/s1 Key: OTVRYZXVVMZHHW-DPAQBDIFBD; InChI=1/C27H45Cl/c1-18(2)7-6-8-19(3)23-11-12-24-22-10-9-20-17-21(28)13-15-26(20,4)25(22)14-16-27(23,24)5/h9,18-19,21-25H,6-8,10-17H2,1-5H3/t19-,21?,22+,23-,24+,25+,26+,27-/m1/s1 Key: OTVRYZXVVMZHHW-FNOPAARDBV
- SMILES: Cl[C@@H]4C/C3=C/C[C@@H]1[C@H](CC[C@]2([C@H]1CC[C@@H]2[C@H](C)CCCC(C)C)C)[C@@]3(C)CC4; CC(C)CCC[C@@H](C)[C@H]4CC[C@@H]3[C@]4(C)CC[C@H]2[C@H]3C\C=C1\CC(Cl)CC[C@@]12C

Properties
Chemical formula	C_{27}H_{45}Cl
Molar mass	405.10
Melting point	94 to 96 °C (201 to 205 °F; 367 to 369 K)
- Except where otherwise noted, data are given for materials in their standard state (at 25 °C [77 °F], 100 kPa). verify (what is ?) Infobox references

Cholesteryl chloride, also called 3-chlorocholest-5-ene or 3β-chlorocholest-5-ene, is an organic chemical, an organochloride derivate cholesterol. It is a liquid crystal material forming clockwise cholesteric liquid crystals. It is a transparent liquid, or a soft crystalline material with melting point around 94-96 °C.

It can be used with cholesteryl nonanoate, cholesteryl benzoate, and/or cholesteryl oleyl carbonate in some thermochromic liquid crystals.

It is used in some hair colors, make-ups, and some other cosmetic preparations.

It can be also used as a component of the liquid crystals used for liquid crystal displays.
