= C18H19N =

The molecular formula C_{18}H_{19}N (molar mass: 249.35 g/mol, exact mass: 249.1517 u) may refer to:

- Alpha-D2PV
- B115
- Benzoctamine
- 4-Cyano-4'-pentylbiphenyl
- McN-4612
