= Temperature sensitive glass =

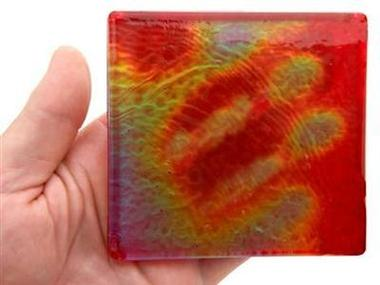
Temp sensitive glass tile

Temperature sensitive glass is a glass material that reacts to ambient temperatures radiated off of other surfaces, e.g. hands or water. The liquid crystals beneath the glass surface impact color upon temperature. There are three main phases of these crystals: nematic, smectic, and chiral.

== Process ==
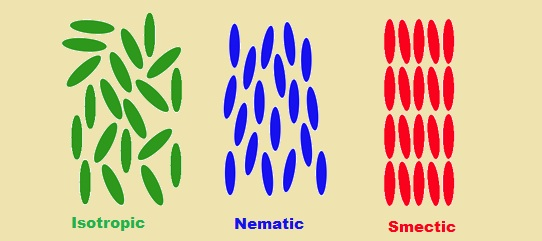
Phases of Liquid Crystals

=== Liquid crystal phases ===
Visual glass goes through a gradual progression while altering colors stages in different heat zones. In order for specific light wavelengths to be reflected off of a temperature sensitive glass, it has to go through one of three main heat phases. In accelerated temperature zones, the crystals respond in the nematic phase. Smectic is in the range of temperatures between that of its neighbors nematic and chiral. These phases are impacted by the pitch which in return reflects specific wavelengths.

=== Pitch effects ===
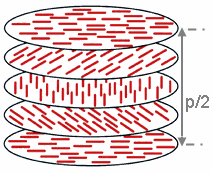
PitchPlanes

Temperature changes the distance between the pitch planes. Pitch tightens with an increase temperature and expands when temperature plummets.

The crystal's pitch is the distance it takes one crystal to make one complete rotation. This determines the wavelength of light that will be reflected and therefore determines the color. The pitch is equal to the corresponding wavelength of light.

== History ==
Friedrich Reinitzer, an Austrian botanist, found in 1888 that there were two separate melting points in cholesteryl benzoate. It melted into a cloudy state which was recorded at 145.5°C, and then again into a clear liquid at the higher melting point of 178.5°C.

== Applications ==
The physical uses of temperature sensitive glass is mostly in a visual context. Some shower walls use these glass tiles on the walls so users can observe how hot/cold the water is before entry. Other applications include mood rings, battery condition display and coffee cups.
