= T-Shirt Hell =

Website that sells humorous T-shirts

- Website type: Retail
- Available in: English
- Founded: 2001
- Founder: Sunshine Megatron
- Industry: Clothing
- Products: T-shirts
- Website: http://www.tshirthell.com
- Registration: Optional
- Current status: Active

T-Shirt Hell is a website that sells humorous T-shirts. The company is known for producing shirts that cause controversy due to their products being offensive and perceived as politically incorrect.

== History ==
T-Shirt Hell was founded by Sunshine Megatron in 2001. Originally named Aaron Landau Schwarz, Megatron legally changed his name in November 2006 following an online contest where users voted on his new name.

The site has been mentioned in the publications Playboy, Maxim, Stuff, Us Weekly, Esquire, the New York Post and on the radio programs Opie and Anthony and The Howard Stern Show. Celebrities pictured wearing T-Shirt Hell shirts include Slash, Mark Cuban, Robert Smith (of The Cure) and Danny Carey (of Tool).

T-Shirt Hell has received a number of cease and desist letters from such people as Rick James, Mary-Kate and Ashley Olsen, and Christopher Reeve over shirts related to the celebrities.

On May 28, 2002, T-Shirt Hell filed a 15 million dollar lawsuit against the Osbourne family when the Osbournes were found selling an original T-Shirt Hell slogan; "Fuck My Family, I'm Moving in With The Osbournes!" through Hot Topic via a newly designed shirt. After several months, the suit was settled out of court.

In 2005, Megatron removed the "Worse Than Hell" section of the website, where particularly offensive shirts were sold. He stopped selling these shirts due to him possibly being poisoned. Several weeks later, he started selling the shirts again. In response to an incident where a passenger wearing a T-Shirt Hell-shirt was thrown off a Southwest Airlines flight due to its offensive content, T-Shirt Hell started to offer alternate transportation free of charge in case of such incidents.

On January 26, 2009, it was announced that T-Shirt Hell would close its doors in February due to Megatron not wanting to deal with 'idiots' anymore. He had reportedly received a great deal of hate mail and threats. Old shirts that had been removed after sparking controversy were once again sold on the website. In early February, it was announced that the site would stay open for another few weeks due to the overwhelming response.

On February 16, Megatron stated that the site was not closing, and that the closure was a stunt aimed at boosting sales. Megatron referred to the stunt as his own "personal stimulus package".

As of 2012, Sunshine Megatron is no longer involved in the company's operations, and in 2017 officially relinquished ownership of T-Shirt Hell. The new owner is Mika Larson, and the company's website is now under the umbrella of Shirts You Buy, LLC, but retains the brand name "T-Shirt Hell".

== See also ==
- Busted Tees
- Headline Shirts
- Snorg Tees
