= Matsui Shikiso Chemical =

Matsui Shikiso Chemical Co., Ltd was founded in 1923 by Kenji Matsui when he opened a paint and dye shop in Kyoto, Japan. Decades later, in 1948, the company started producing crayons and painting materials. By the 1950s, Matsui Shikiso Chemical discontinued their crayons and painting materials lines to focus on offering water based inks and pigments targeted principally to the textile screen printing industry.

In the early 1980s, Matsui Shikiso Chemical developed Chromicolor, the first thermochromic paints, thermochromic inks, and thermochromic plastics, broadcast on Japan's national public channel, NHK (Nippon Hosoku Kaisha), introducing thermochromism to the world. Matsui's continued success led to establishing a subsidiary in Los Angeles, California named Matsui and Company, Inc. to better service their growing international clientele. By the end of the decade, Matsui and Company, Inc. changed its name to Matsui International Co., Inc., to capitalize on international markets. Soon after the establishment, Matsui entered the heat transfer business, under the trademark Unimark, USA. Matsui Shikiso manufactured the color dyes for Hypercolor shirts.

In recent years, Matsui Chemical has focused more on developing digital ink to enable printing and textile companies to streamline their production. Their new ARTJET heat transfer printers reduce the labor involved in the printing process through digital control configurations. This simplified, digitized process means engineers and expert skillsets are not longer necessary for print production.

Yoshiyuki Yasuda is the President of Matsui Shikiso Chemical Co., Ltd.
