= Leuco dye =

Dye with two chemical forms

Transformation between leuco and colored form of crystal violet lactone, halochromism.

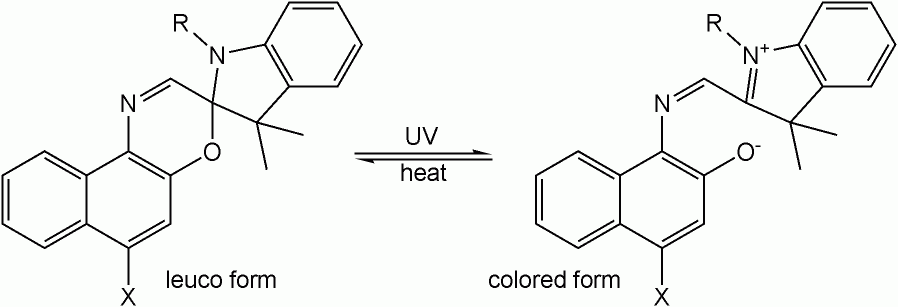
Transformation between leuco and colored form induced by ultraviolet radiation, photochromism.

A leuco dye (from the Greek λευκό leuko: white) is a dye which can switch between two chemical forms, one of which is colorless. Reversible transformations can be caused by heat, light or pH, resulting in examples of thermochromism, photochromism and halochromism, respectively. Irreversible transformations typically involve reduction or oxidation. The colorless form is sometimes referred to as the leuco form.

Leuco dyes form the basis of thermal printer papers and certain pH indicators.

From the applications perspective, leuco dyes are "the most important class of thermochromic compounds". The dyes are typically applied in the form of microcapsules with the mixture sealed inside. An illustrative example is the Hypercolor fashion, where microcapsules with crystal violet lactone, weak acid, and a dissociable salt dissolved in dodecanol are applied to the fabric. When the solvent is solid, the dye exists in its lactone leuco form, while when the solvent melts, the salt dissociates, the pH inside the microcapsule lowers, the dye becomes protonated, its lactone ring opens, and its absorption spectrum shifts drastically, therefore it becomes deeply violet. In this case the apparent thermochromism is in fact halochromism. The dyes most commonly used are spirolactones, fluorans, spiropyrans, and fulgides. The acids include bisphenol A, parabens, 1,2,3-triazole derivates, and 4-hydroxycoumarin and act as proton donors, changing the dye molecule between its leuco form and its protonated colored form; stronger acids would make the change irreversible.

Leuco dyes are suitable for general indicators of approximate temperature ("too cool", "too hot", "about OK"), or for various novelty items. They are usually used in combination with some other pigment, producing a color change between the color of the base pigment and the color of the pigment combined with the color of the non-leuco form of the leuco dye. Organic leuco dyes are available for temperature ranges between about −5 °C (23 °F) and 60 °C (140 °F), in wide range of colors. The color change usually happens in a 3 °C (37 °F) interval.

An application of leuco dyes is in the Duracell battery state indicators. A layer of a leuco dye is applied on a resistive strip to indicate its heating, thus gauging the amount of current the battery is able to supply. The strip is triangular-shaped, changing its resistance along its length, therefore heating up a proportionally long segment with the amount of current flowing through it. The length of the segment above the threshold temperature for the leuco dye then becomes colored.

Exposure to ultraviolet radiation, solvents and high temperatures reduce the lifespan of leuco dyes. Temperatures above about 200–230 °C (392–446 °F) typically cause irreversible damage to leuco dyes; a time-limited exposure of some types to about 250 °C (482 °F) is allowed during manufacturing.

Thermochromic paints use liquid crystals or leuco dye technology. After absorbing a certain amount of light or heat, the crystallic or molecular structure of the pigment reversibly changes in such a way that it absorbs and emits light at a different wavelength than at lower temperatures. Thermochromic paints are seen quite often as a coating on coffee mugs, whereby once hot coffee is poured into the mugs, the thermochromic paint absorbs the heat and becomes colored or transparent, therefore changing the appearance of the mug. These are known as magic mugs or heat changing mugs. Another common example is the use of leuco dye in spoons used in ice cream parlors and frozen yogurt shops. Once dipped into the cold desserts, part of the spoon appears to change color.

== Examples ==
The most common example is in applying sulfur dyes and vat dyes, with indigo being a classic case. This is characteristically purple but is also completely insoluble in water, meaning that it cannot be applied to clothes directly. It is instead reduced to indigo white (sometimes Leucoindigo), which is water-soluble but colorless. When a submerged fabric is removed from a dyebath of white indigo the dye quickly combines with oxygen in the air and reverts to the insoluble, intensely colored indigo. The reduction step is typically achieved with sodium dithionite, hydroxyacetone and hydrogen, or by electrochemical methods.

Indigo white (leucoindigo)

Indigo

The spiro form of an oxazine is a colorless leuco dye; the conjugated system of the oxazine and another aromatic part of the molecule is separated by an sp^{3}-hybridized "spiro" carbon. After protonating a part of the molecule, irradiation with UV light (see Photochromism), or introducing other kind of such change, the bond between the spiro carbon and the oxazine interrupts, the ring opens, the spiro carbon achieves sp^{2} hybridization and becomes planar, the aromatic group rotates, aligns its π-orbitals with the rest of the molecule, and a conjugated system forms, with ability to absorb photons of visible light, and therefore appear colorful.

Another example of a leuco dye is the crystal violet lactone, which in its lactone form is colorless or slightly yellowish, but in low pH, when it is protonated, it becomes intensely violet. Other examples are phenolphthalein and thymolphthalein, colorless in acidic to neutral pH, but becoming pink and blue in alkaline environment. Other example are many redox indicators, which undergo reversible color change between colored and colorless form at a specific electrode potential.

== See also ==
- Flexplay, trademark for a DVD-compatible optical video disk format that uses leuco dye to intentionally "wear away" after a limited number of playings.
- Hypercolor, clothing that changes color with heat
