= Crystal violet lactone =

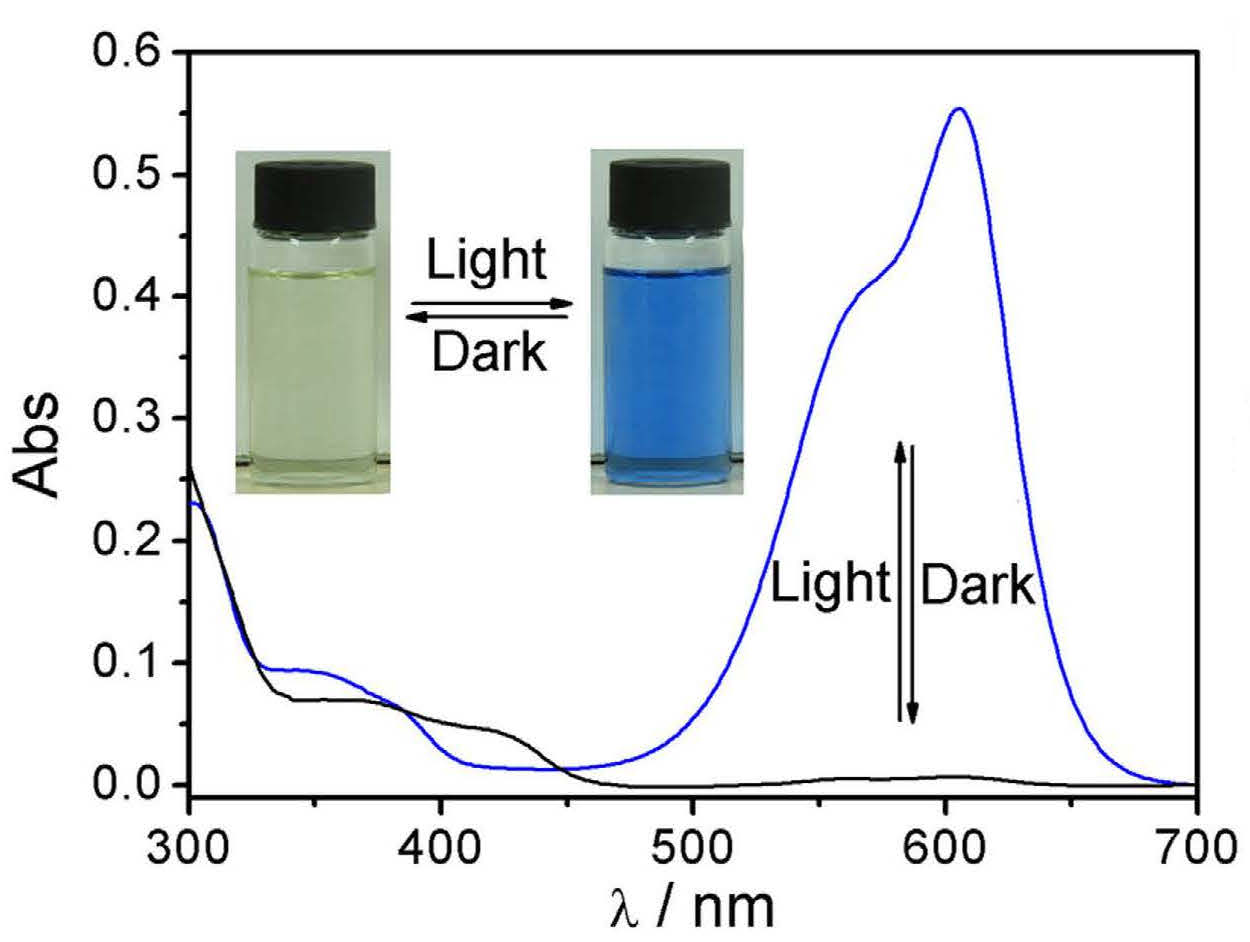
Reversible photochromism of a crystal violet lactone salicylaldehyde hydrazone Zn(II) complex dissolved in dichloromethane

Crystal violet lactone (CVL) is a leuco dye, a lactone derivate of crystal violet 10B. In pure state it is a slightly yellowish crystalline powder, soluble in nonpolar or slightly polar organic solvents.

The central carbon in the leuco form is in a tetrahedral configuration, with four covalent bonds. In an acidic environment, the lactone ring is broken, with the oxygen detaching from the central carbon. This now-trivalent position is a planar carbocation that is resonance stabilized, interconnecting the π systems of the aromatic rings and the amino functional groups. This single large conjugated system is a chromophore with strong absorption in visible spectrum, giving this compound its distinctive color. This chemical is usually drawn in the resonance structure with the cation on nitrogen.

Transformation between leuco and colored form of crystal violet lactone, halochromism

It was the first dye used in carbonless copy papers, and it is still widely used in this application. It is also the leuco dye component in some thermochromic dyes, e.g. in the Hypercolor line of clothing. One of its novel uses is a security marker for fuels.

Its limitations as a fuel marker have to be carefully contemplated by users, as Crystal Violet Lactone (leuco) readily transforms to the colored species in >10% Ethanol Containing Gasoline, imparting a strong color. Crystal violet lactone as a fuel marker was covered by the BASF patent DE4422336A1 until June 2014.

It may cause allergic contact dermatitis in people handling the carbonless copy paper.
