= Cholesteryl nonanoate =

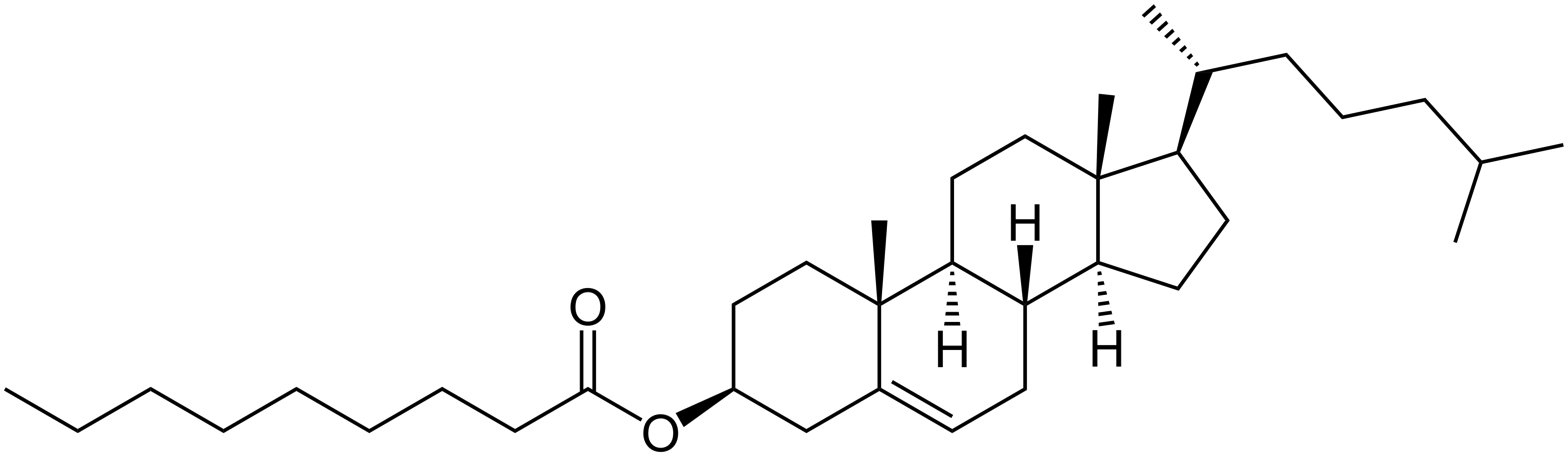

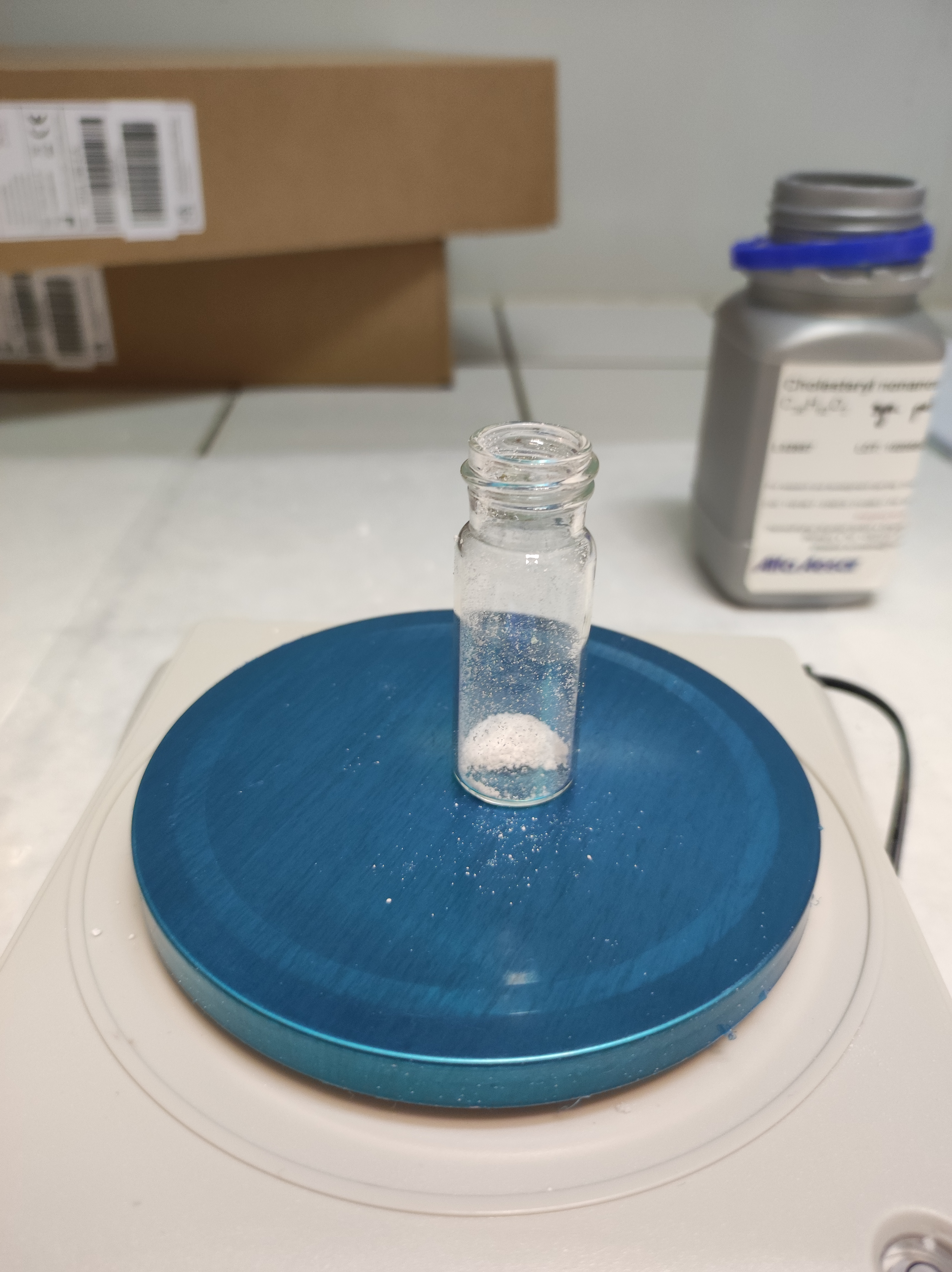

Names
- IUPAC name Cholest-5-en-3β-yl nonanoate
- Systematic IUPAC name (1R,3aS,3bS,7S,9aR,9bS,11aR)-9a,11a-Dimethyl-1-[(2R)-6-methylheptan-2-yl]-2,3,3a,3b,4,6,7,8,9,9a,9b,10,11,11a-tetradecahydro-1H-cyclopenta[a]phenanthren-7-yl nonanoate
- Other names Cholesteryl nonanoate, cholesteryl pelargonate, 3β-cholest-5-en-3-ol nonaoate

Identifiers
CAS Number	1182-66-7
3D model (JSmol)	Interactive image
ChemSpider	2005816
ECHA InfoCard	100.013.326
EC Number	214-658-3
PubChem CID	2723614
UNII	4313O7P4XW
CompTox Dashboard (EPA)	DTXSID70889364
- InChI: InChI=1S/C36H62O2/c1-7-8-9-10-11-12-16-34(37)38-29-21-23-35(5)28(25-29)17-18-30-32-20-19-31(27(4)15-13-14-26(2)3)36(32,6)24-22-33(30)35/h17,26-27,29-33H,7-16,18-25H2,1-6H3/t27-,29+,30+,31-,32+,33+,35+,36-/m1/s1 Key: WCLNGBQPTVENHV-MKQVXYPISA-N; InChI=1/C36H62O2/c1-7-8-9-10-11-12-16-34(37)38-29-21-23-35(5)28(25-29)17-18-30-32-20-19-31(27(4)15-13-14-26(2)3)36(32,6)24-22-33(30)35/h17,26-27,29-33H,7-16,18-25H2,1-6H3/t27-,29+,30+,31-,32+,33+,35+,36-/m1/s1 Key: WCLNGBQPTVENHV-MKQVXYPIBA
- SMILES: O=C(O[C@@H]4C/C3=C/C[C@@H]1[C@H](CC[C@]2([C@H]1CC[C@@H]2[C@H](C)CCCC(C)C)C)[C@@]3(C)CC4)CCCCCCCC

Properties
Chemical formula	C_{36}H_{62}O_{2}
Appearance	White crystals
Melting point	77 to 82 °C (171 to 180 °F; 350 to 355 K)
Solubility in water	Insoluble
- Except where otherwise noted, data are given for materials in their standard state (at 25 °C [77 °F], 100 kPa). verify (what is ?) Infobox references

Cholesteryl nonanoate, also called cholesteryl pelargonate, 3β-cholest-5-en-3-ol nonaoate or cholest-5-ene-3-β-yl nonanoate, is an ester of cholesterol and nonanoic acid. It is a liquid crystal material forming cholesteric liquid crystals with helical structure. It forms spherulite crystals.

== Uses ==
It is used in some hair colors, make-ups, and some other cosmetic preparations; e.g. the ISP ColorFlow line is based on mixtures with e.g. cholesteryl chloride, cholesteryl oleyl carbonate and BHT. The mixture provides an opalescent, iridescent appearance.

It is also used in some pleochroic dyes and together with e.g. cholesteryl oleyl carbonate and cholesteryl benzoate in some thermochromic applications.

It can be also used as a component of the liquid crystals used for liquid crystal displays.
