= T-shirt =

Style of inexpensive fabric shirt

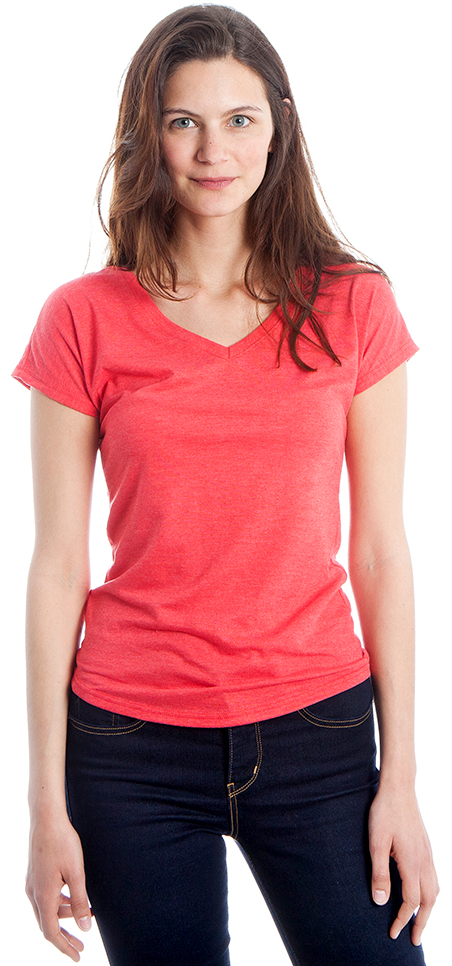
- A woman wearing a V-neck T-shirt
- Type: Shirt
- Material: Cotton; polyester

A T-shirt (also spelled tee shirt, or tee for short) is a style of fabric shirt named after the T shape of its body and sleeves. Traditionally, it has short sleeves and a round neckline, known as a crew neck, which lacks a collar. T-shirts are generally made of stretchy, light, and inexpensive fabric and are easy to clean. The T-shirt evolved from undergarments used in the 19th century and, in the mid-20th century, transitioned from undergarments to general-use casual clothing.

T-shirts are typically made of cotton textile in a stockinette or jersey knit, which has a distinctively pliable texture compared to shirts made of woven cloth. Some modern versions have a body made from a continuously knitted tube, produced on a circular knitting machine, such that the torso has no side seams. The manufacture of T-shirts has become highly automated and may include cutting fabric with a laser or a water jet.

T-shirts are inexpensive to produce and are often part of fast fashion, leading to outsized sales of T-shirts compared to other attire. For example, two billion T-shirts are sold worldwide each year, and the average person in Sweden buys nine T-shirts a year. Production processes vary but can be environmentally intensive and include the environmental impact caused by their materials, such as cotton, which uses large amounts of water and pesticides.

== History ==
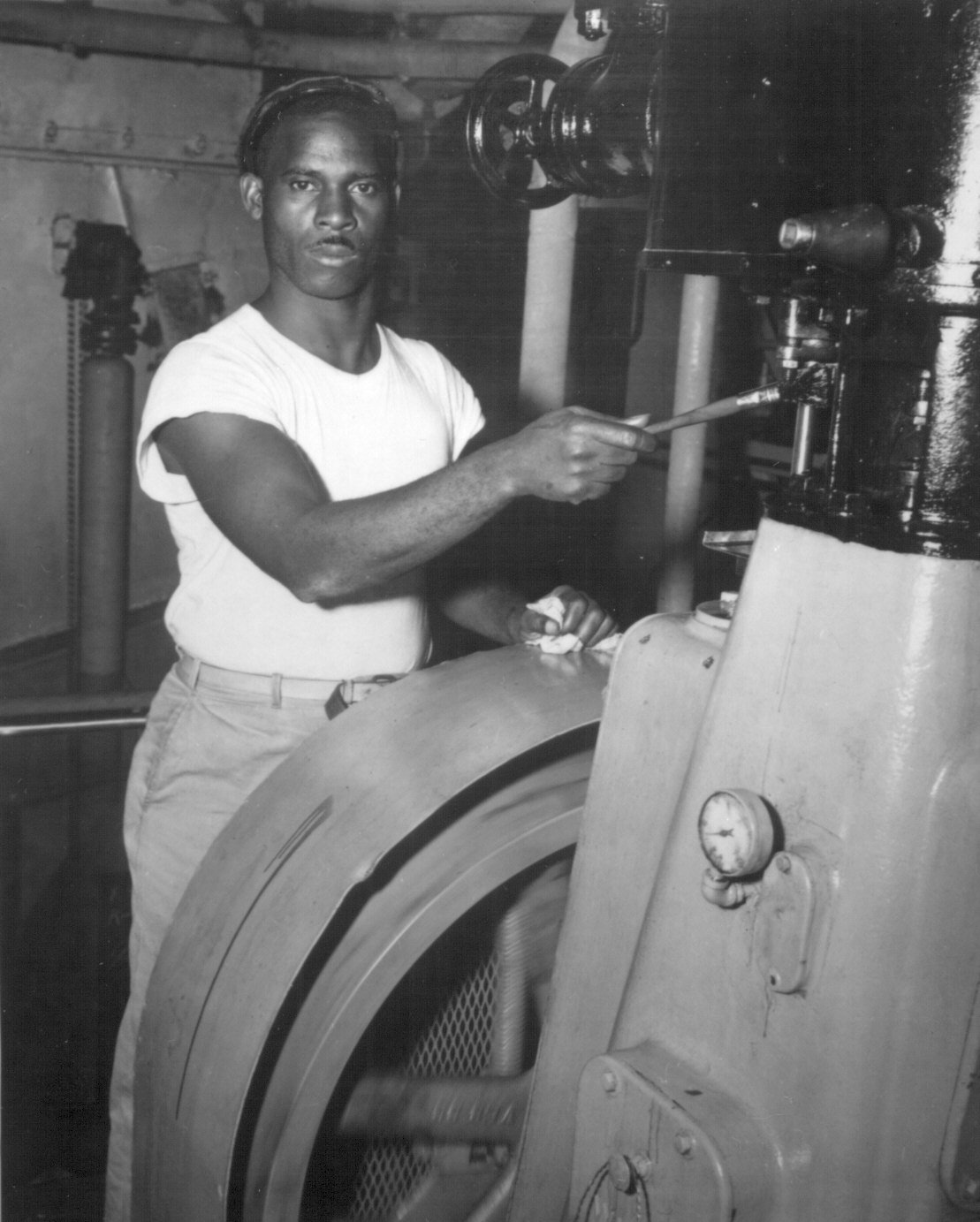
US Merchant Marine sailor in 1944

Simple, T-shaped top garments have been a part of human clothing since ancient times; garments similar to the T-shirt worn earlier in history are generally called tunics.

The modern T-shirt evolved from undergarments used in the 19th century. First, the one-piece union suit underwear was cut into separate top and bottom garments, with the top long enough to tuck under the waistband of the bottoms. With and without buttons, they were adopted by miners and stevedores during the late 19th century as a convenient covering for hot environments.

In 1913, the U.S. Navy first issued them as undergarments. These were a crew-necked, short-sleeved, white cotton undershirt to be worn under a uniform. It became common for sailors and Marines in work parties, the early submarines, and tropical climates to remove their uniform jacket, thus wearing (and soiling) only the undershirt. They soon became popular as a bottom layer of clothing for workers in various industries, including agriculture. The T-shirt was easily fitted, easily cleaned, and inexpensive; for these reasons, it became the shirt of choice for young boys. Boys' shirts were made in various colors and patterns. The word T-shirt became part of American English by the 1920s, and appeared in the Merriam-Webster Dictionary.

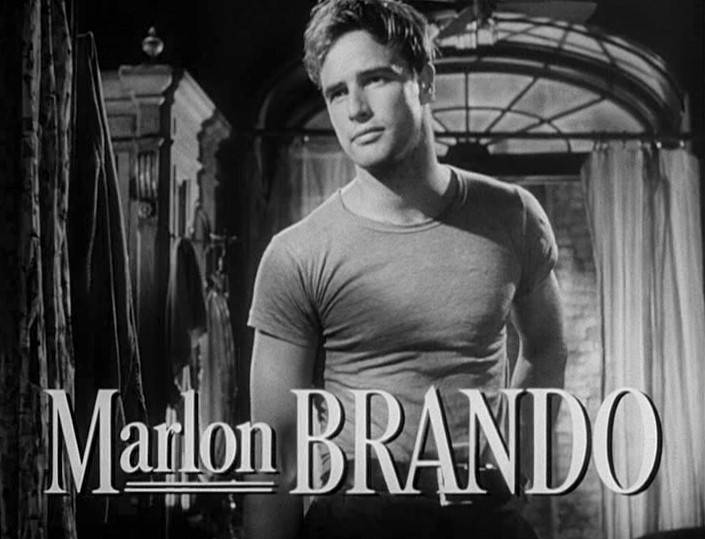
Marlon Brando in the trailer for A Streetcar Named Desire

By the Great Depression, the T-shirt was often the default garment to be worn when doing farm or ranch chores, as well as other times when modesty called for a torso covering but conditions called for lightweight fabrics. Following World War II, it was worn by Navy men as undergarments; gradually, veterans could be seen wearing their uniform trousers with their T-shirts as casual clothing. The shirts became even more popular in the 1950s after Marlon Brando wore one in A Streetcar Named Desire, and they finally achieved status as fashionable, stand-alone, outerwear garments. Often boys wore them while doing chores and playing outside, eventually opening up the idea of wearing them as general-purpose casual clothing.

Printed T-shirts were in limited use by 1942 when an Air Corps Gunnery School T-shirt appeared on the cover of Life magazine. In the 1960s, printed T-shirts gained popularity for self-expression as well as for advertisements, protests, and souvenirs.

Current versions are available in many different designs and fabrics, and styles include crew-neck and V-neck shirts. T-shirts are among the most worn garments of clothing used today. T-shirts are especially popular with branding for companies or merchandise, as they are inexpensive to make and purchase.

== Trends ==
T-shirts were originally worn as undershirts, but are now worn frequently as the only piece of clothing on the top half of the body, other than possibly a brassiere or, rarely, a waistcoat (vest). T-shirts have also become a medium for self-expression and advertising, with any imaginable combination of words, art and photographs on display.

A T-shirt typically extends to the waist. Variants of the T-shirt, such as the V-neck, have been developed. Hip hop fashion calls for tall-T shirts which may extend down to the knees. A similar item is the T-shirt dress or T-dress, a dress-length T-shirt that can be worn without pants. Long T-shirts are also sometimes worn by women as nightgowns. A 1990s trend in women's clothing involved tight-fitting cropped T-shirts, called crop tops, short enough to reveal the midriff. Another less popular trend is wearing a short-sleeved T-shirt of a contrasting color over a long-sleeved T-shirt, which is known as layering. Tight-fitting T-shirts are called fitted, tailored or baby doll T-shirts.

The rise of social media and video sharing sites led to the growth of tutorials on DIY T-shirt projects. These videos typically provide instructions on how to modify an old shirt into a new, more fashionable form.

=== Expressive messages ===
Since the 1960s, T-shirts have flourished as a form of personal expression. Screen printed T-shirts have been a standard form of marketing for major American consumer products, such as Coca-Cola and Mickey Mouse, since the 1970s. They have also been commonly used to commemorate an event or make a political or personal statement. Since the 1990s, it has become common practice for companies of all sizes to produce T-shirts with their corporate logos or messages as part of their overall advertising campaigns. Since the late 1980s and especially the 1990s, T-shirts with prominent designer-name logos have become popular, especially with teenagers and young adults. These garments allow consumers to flaunt their taste for designer brands in an inexpensive way, in addition to being decorative. Examples of designer T-shirt branding include Calvin Klein, FUBU, Ralph Lauren, American Apparel, and The Gap. These examples also include representations of rock bands, among other obscure pop-culture references. Licensed T-shirts are also extremely popular. Movie and TV T-shirts can have images of the actors, logos, and funny quotations from the movie or TV show. Often, the most popular T-shirts are those that characters wore in the film itself (e.g., Bubba Gump from Forrest Gump and Vote For Pedro from Napoleon Dynamite).

In the early 1980s, designer Katharine Hamnett pioneered outsize T-shirts with large-print slogans. The early first decade of the 21st century saw the renewed popularity of T-shirts with slogans and designs, with a strong inclination to humor and/or irony. The trend only increased later that decade, embraced by celebrities such as Britney Spears and Paris Hilton, and reflected back on them, too ('Team Aniston'). The political and social statements that T-shirts often display have become, since the first decade of the 21st century, one of the reasons that they have so deeply permeated different levels of culture and society. These statements range from completely harmless one to statements or quotes that may be found to be offensive, shocking, or pornographic to some. Despite this, or perhaps due to it, companies like T-Shirt Hell (a T-shirt store known for offensive and shocking messages) and various other organizations have caught on to the statement-making trend (whether offensive or otherwise), including chain and independent stores, websites, schools, clubs, and groups of all kinds, with some even incorporating said trends into their respective business models.

An early widespread T-shirt message that demonstrated their popularity among tourists was the humorous phrase "I went to _____ and all I got was this lousy T-shirt." (Examples include "My parents went to Las Vegas and all I got was this lousy T-shirt.")

T-shirt exchange is an activity where people trade the T-shirts that they are wearing.

Artists like Bill Beckley, Glen Baldridge and Peter Klashorst use T-shirts in their work. Models such as Victoria Beckham and Gisele Bündchen wore T-shirts through the 2000s. Paris Fashion Week 2014 featured a grunge style T-shirt.

== Decoration ==
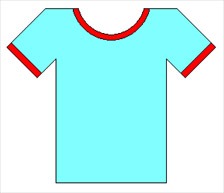
Ringer T-shirt

Wikipedia round neck T-shirt

In the early 1950s, several companies based in Miami, Florida started decorating T-shirts with different resort names and various characters. The first to do so on an extensive scale was Tropix Togs, founded by Sam Kantor. After meeting The Walt Disney Company in a Miami airport in 1976, Kantor's company became the original licensee for Walt Disney characters including Mickey Mouse and Davy Crockett. The T-shirts were sold when Walt Disney World first opened.

Later, other companies expanded into the T-shirt printing business, including Sherry Manufacturing Company, also based in Miami. Founded in 1948 by owner Quentin H. Sandler, Sherry initially screen printed souvenir tourist scarves. It quickly evolved into one of the largest US screen printed resort and licensed apparel companies, and by 2018, was running automatic screen print presses and producing up to 20,000 T-shirts each day.

In the 1960s, the ringer T-shirt appeared and became a staple fashion for youth and rock-n-rollers. Ringer T-shirts are a solid-color shirt with bands of a second color around the collar and the lower edges of the sleeves, with or without an additional front decoration.

The 1960s also saw the emergence of tie-dyeing and screen printing on the basic T-shirt, which became a medium for wearable art, commercial advertising, souvenir messages, and protest art messages. Psychedelic art poster designer Warren Dayton pioneered several political, protest, and pop-culture art pieces, printed large and in color on T-shirts featuring images of Cesar Chavez, political cartoons, and other cultural icons in an article in the Los Angeles Times magazine in late 1969 (ironically, the printing clothing company quickly cancelled the experimental line, fearing there would not be a market).

In the late 1960s, Richard Ellman, Robert Tree, Bill Kelly, and Stanley Mouse set up the Monster Company in Mill Valley, California to produce fine art designs expressly for T-shirts. Their designs often featured emblems and motifs associated with the Grateful Dead and marijuana culture. Additionally, one of the most popular symbols to emerge from the political turmoil of the 1960s was the T-shirt bearing the face of Marxist revolutionary Che Guevara.

Today, many notable and memorable T-shirts produced in the 1970s have become ensconced in pop culture. Examples include bright yellow happy face, The Rolling Stones' "tongue and lips logo", and Milton Glaser's "I ♥ N Y" designs. In the mid-1980s, the white T-shirt became fashionable after the actor Don Johnson wore it with an Armani suit in the Miami Vice series.

=== V-neck ===
A V-neck T-shirt has a V-shaped neckline, as opposed to the round neckline of the more common crew neck shirt (also called a U-neck). V-necks were introduced so that the neckline of the shirt does not show when worn beneath an outer shirt.

=== Screen printing ===
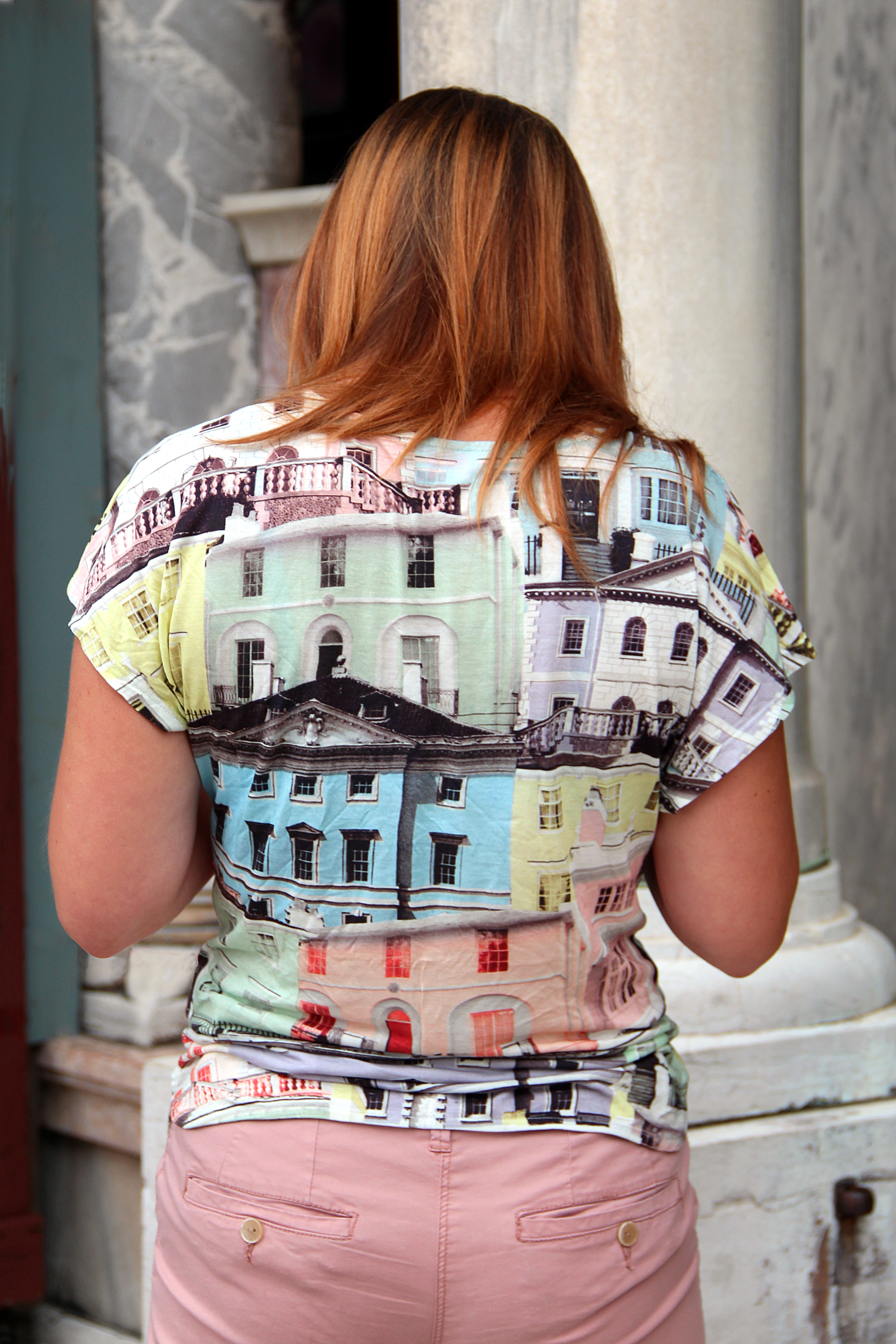
A woman wearing a T-shirt with an architectural motif

The most common form of commercial T-shirt decoration is screen printing, in which a design is separated into individual colors. Plastisol or water-based inks are applied to the shirt through mesh screens partially coated with an emulsion, which limits the areas where ink is deposited. In most commercial T-shirt printing, a limited number of spot colors (typically one to four) are used to print the design. To achieve a wider color spectrum with a limited number of colors, process printing (using only cyan, magenta, yellow and black ink) or the simulated process (using only white, black, red, green, blue, and gold ink) is effective. Process printing is best suited for light-colored shirts while the simulated process is best suited for dark-colored shirts.

The invention of plastisol in 1959 provided a more durable and stretchable ink than water-based inks, allowing much greater variety in T-shirt designs. Very few companies continue to use water-based inks on their shirts; the majority prefer plastisol because it allows printing on varying colors without the need for color adjustment at the art level.

Specialty inks trend in and out of fashion and include shimmer, puff, discharge, and chino-based inks. A metallic foil can be heat pressed and stamped onto any plastisol ink. When combined with shimmer ink, metallics give a mirror-like effect wherever the previously screened plastisol ink was applied. Specialty inks are more expensive to purchase and screen, and tend to appear on boutique garments.

Other methods of T-shirt decoration airbrushing, appliqué, embroidery, impressing or embossing, and the ironing on of either flock lettering, heat transfers, or dye-sublimation transfers. Laser printers, using special toners containing sublimation dyes, can print designs on plain paper which can then be permanently heat-transferred to T-shirts.

In the 1980s, thermochromatic dyes were used to produce T-shirts that changed color when subjected to heat; Global Hypercolour was one of the most popular youth brands to do so in the US and UK. One downside of color-change garments is that the dyes are easily damaged by washing in warm water, and can also stain other clothes during washing.

=== Tie-dye ===
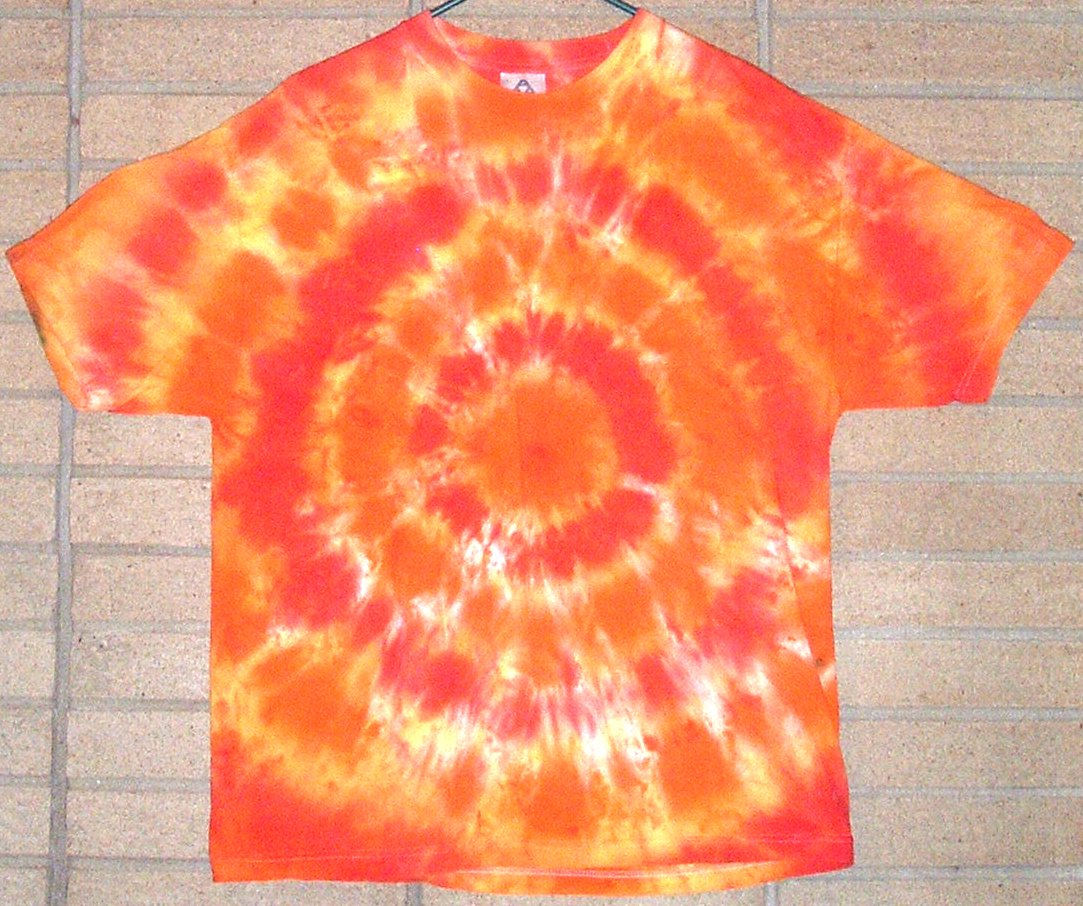
An example of a tie-dyed T-shirt

Tie-dye originated in India, Japan and Africa as early as the sixth century. Forms of tie-dye include Bandhani (the oldest known technique), used in Indian cultures, and Shibori, primarily used in Japanese cultures. It was not until the 1960s that tie-dye was introduced to America during the hippie movement.

=== Heat transfer vinyl (HTV) ===
Another form of T-shirt decoration is heat transfer vinyl, also called HTV. HTV is a polyurethane material that allows apparel designers to create unique layered designs using a specialized software program. Once the design is created, it is then cut through the material using a vinyl cutter (or Cut n Press) machine.

There are dozens of different colors available, as well as glitter, reflective, and now even unique patterns (such as mermaid skin) which come in rolls and sheets.

After the design is cut, there is a process called "weeding" whereby the areas that do not represent the design are picked away from the transfer sheet and removed so that the intended design remains. HTV is typically smooth to the touch and does not feel rubbery or stiff. The edges are typically clean-cut and produce high contrast.

Designers can also create multiple color designs, or multi-layered designs, using HTV. This process is done in the design software before the design is sent to the cutter for the different materials. A heat press is then used to apply pressure and heat to the vinyl so that the material permanently adheres to the garment. The temperature and pressure vary according to manufacturer specifications.

=== Dye-sublimation printing ===
Dye-sublimation printing is a widely used direct-to-garment digital printing technology using full-color artwork to transfer images to polyester and polymer-coated substrate based T-shirts. Dye sublimation (also commonly referred to as all-over printing) came into widespread use in the 21st century, enabling some previously impossible designs. The technology allows unlimited colors using large CMYK printers with special paper and ink, unlike screen printing which requires screens for each color of the design. All-over print T-shirts have solved the problem with color fading, and vibrancy is greater than most standard printing methods, but the process requires synthetic fabrics for the ink to take hold. The key feature of dye-sublimated clothing is that the design is not printed on top of the garment, but permanently dyed into the threads of the shirt, ensuring that it will never fade.

Dye sublimation is economically viable for small-quantity printing; the unit cost is similar for short or long production runs. Screen printing has higher setup costs, requiring large numbers to be produced to be cost-effective, and the unit cost is higher.

Sublimation uses heat and pressure to change solid ink into a gas without first passing through a liquid phase. The design is first produced in a computer image file format such as jpg, gif, png. It is then printed on a purpose-made computer printer (as of 2016, most commonly Epson or Ricoh brands) using large heat presses to vaporize the ink directly into the fabric. By mid-2012, the method had become widely used for T-shirts.

=== Other methods ===
Other methods of decorating shirts include using paints, markers, fabric transfer crayons, dyes and spray paint. Some techniques that can be used include sponging, stenciling, daubing, stamping, screen printing, bleaching, and many more. Some new T-shirt creators have used designs with multiple advanced techniques, which includes using glow-in-the-dark inks, heat-sensitive fabrics, foil printing and all-over printing. Fashion designer Robert Geller created a T-shirt collection featuring oversized graphic T-shirts made from extremely soft jersey materials. Designer Alexander Wang released variations of T-shirts from oversized scoop necks, tanks to striped, slouchy rayon jerseys. Terence Koh T-shirts featured an upside down portrait with a real bullet hole in the head.

== See also ==
- Concert T-shirt
- Inkjet transfer
- Kit (association football)
- Polo shirt
- Raglan sleeve
- Wet T-shirt contest
