= Snorg Tees =

American clothing company

SnorgTees
- Industry: Apparel
- Founded: 2004; 21 years ago in Atlanta, Georgia
- Founders: Matt Walls; Bryan Walls
- Headquarters: Atlanta, Georgia, United States
- Website: snorgtees.com

SnorgTees is an American company based in the US state of Georgia, specializing in T-shirt designs that reference popular culture or make humorous assertions about the wearer. Auburn University student Alice Fraasa became a minor internet celebrity after modelling for the company's online advertisements.

== History ==
The company was started during 2004 by two brothers in Atlanta, Georgia. Matt Walls is the president of the company, and his brother Bryan Walls is in charge of the designs.

The business grew rapidly, becoming profitable within a year, and earning SnorgTees the number 6 rank on the Bulldog 100, which is a list of the fastest growing companies owned by University of Georgia alumni.

== See also ==
- Headline Shirts
