= Thermotropic crystal =

A liquid crystal phase is thermotropic if its order parameter is determined by temperature. At high temperatures, liquid crystals become an isotropic liquid and at low temperatures, they tend to glassify. In a thermotropic crystal, those phase transitions occur only at temperature extremes; the phase is insensitive to concentration.

Most thermotropic liquid crystals are composed of rod-like molecules, and admit nematic, smectic, or cholesterolic phases.

== See also ==
- Thermochromism
- Thermotropic liquid crystals
