= Headline Shirts =

American T-shirt company

Headline Shirts is an American online T‑shirt company headquartered in San Francisco, California. Founded in 2004 by Atticus Von, the brand is known for its satirical and popular culture inspired graphics, frequently drawing on current events, history, politics, and humor.

== History ==
Headline Shirts was founded in 2004 by San Francisco–based designer Atticus Von. The brand gained attention for its subversive, media‑commentary apparel, often described as a wearable version of The Colbert Report. In the early 2010s, the brand was featured in outlets such as Boing Boing, San Francisco Bay Guardian, Modern Luxury, NOTCOT, and Tcritic.

== Partnership ==
In 2024, Headline Shirts partnered with Solid Threads, a San Francisco–based apparel curator, allowing the brand's 150+ top designs to be sold on T‑shirts, hoodies, long‑sleeves, hats, and kids’ sizes. The brand has been carried by retailers such as Tees.ca and Nerd Kung Fu.

== See also ==
- Snorg Tees
- T Shirt Hell
