= Hypercolor =

Clothing brand that changes color

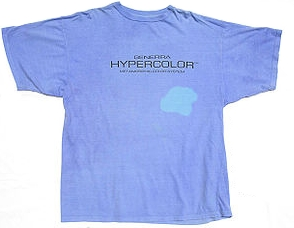
Example of a Hypercolor T-shirt. A hair dryer was used to change the blue to turquoise.

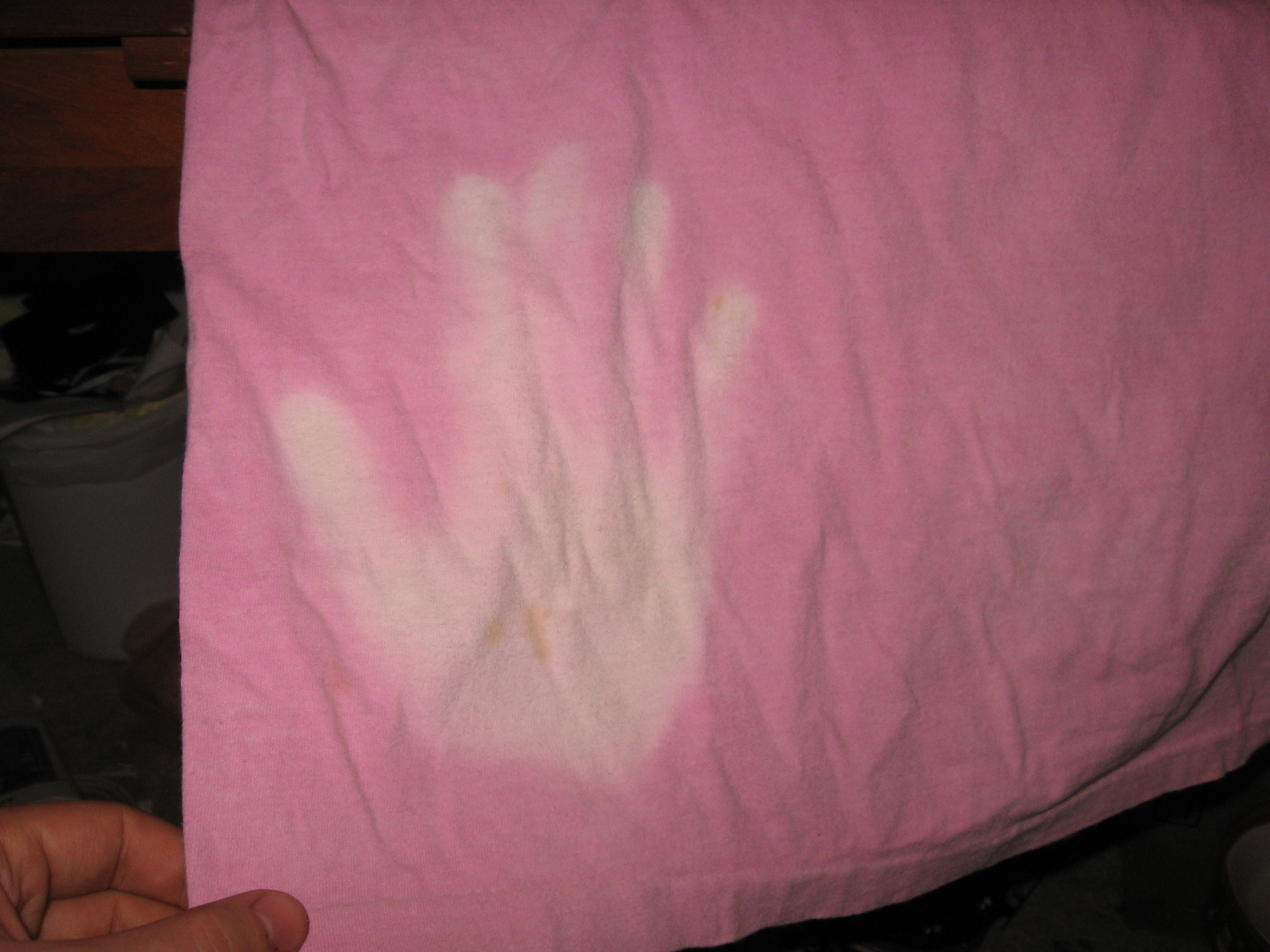
Another example of a Hypercolor T-shirt.

Hypercolor was a line of clothing, mainly T-shirts and shorts, that changed color with heat.

They were manufactured by Generra Sportswear Company of Seattle and marketed in the United States as Generra Hypercolor or Generra Hypergrafix and elsewhere as Global Hypercolor. They contained a thermochromic pigment made by Matsui Shikiso Chemical of Japan, that changed between two colors—one when cold, one when warm. The shirts were produced with several color change choices beginning in 1991. The effect could easily be permanently damaged, particularly when the clothing was washed in hotter than recommended water, ironed, bleached, or tumble-dried.

Generra Sportswear Co. had originally been founded as a men's sportswear distributor and importer in Seattle in 1980. The company was sold to Texas-based Farah Manufacturing Co. in 1984 and bought back by its founders in 1989. In 1986, the company added childrenswear and womenswear items to their portfolio. They struggled to meet the overwhelming demand for Hypercolor products. Between February and May 1991 they sold $50 million in Hypercolor garments. Generra went bankrupt due to mismanagement and fading demand in 1992. The Hypercolor business for the U.S. market was sold to The Seattle T-shirt Company in 1993; Generra kept the rights for the international market. The company emerged from bankruptcy in 1995 as a licensing business. The Generra name was acquired by Public Clothing Co. of New York in 2002. Today, Generra Co. is a contemporary women's and men's apparel brand headquartered in New York City.

In the early 2000s, the technique was revived by a number of apparel brands. In mid-2020, the color-changing clothing trend was revived yet again by several online retailers selling color-changing swim trunks.

== Principle ==
Substances that can change color due to a change in temperature are called thermochromes. There are two common types of thermochromes: liquid crystals (used in mood rings) and leuco dyes (used in Hypercolor T-shirts).

The color change of Hypercolor shirts is based on combination of two colors: the color of the dyed fabric, which remained constant, and the color of the thermochromic dye. Droplets of the thermochromic dye mixture are enclosed in transparent microcapsules, a few micrometers in diameter, bound to the fibers of the fabric.

Transformation between leuco and colored form of crystal violet lactone in response to varying acidity, which is caused by changing temperature

The thermochromic droplets are actually a mixture of several chemicals—crystal violet lactone (the color-changing dye itself), benzotriazole (a weak acid), and a quaternary ammonium salt of a fatty acid (myristylammonium oleate) dissolved in 1-dodecanol as solvent. Together, these lead to a reversible chemical reaction in response to temperature change that produces a change of color.

At low temperatures, the mixture is a solid. The weak acid forms a colored complex with the leuco dye by causing the lactone ring in the center of the dye molecule to open. At high temperatures, above 24–27 °C (75–81 °F), the solvent melts and the ammonium salt dissociates, allowing it to react with the weak acid. This reaction increases the pH, which leads to closing of the lactone ring of the dye to convert it to its colorless (leuco) form.

Therefore, at the low temperature the color of the shirt is the combination of the color of the encapsulated colored dye with the color of the dyed fabric, while at higher temperatures the capsules become colorless and the color of the fabric prevails.
