= Cholesteryl oleyl carbonate =

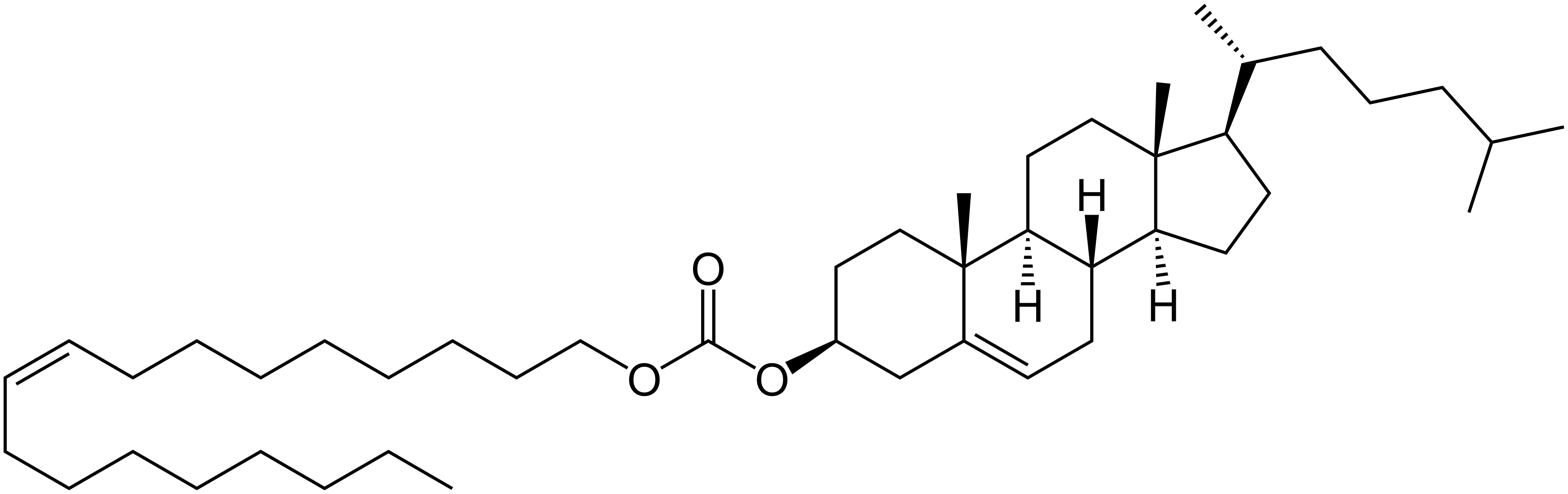

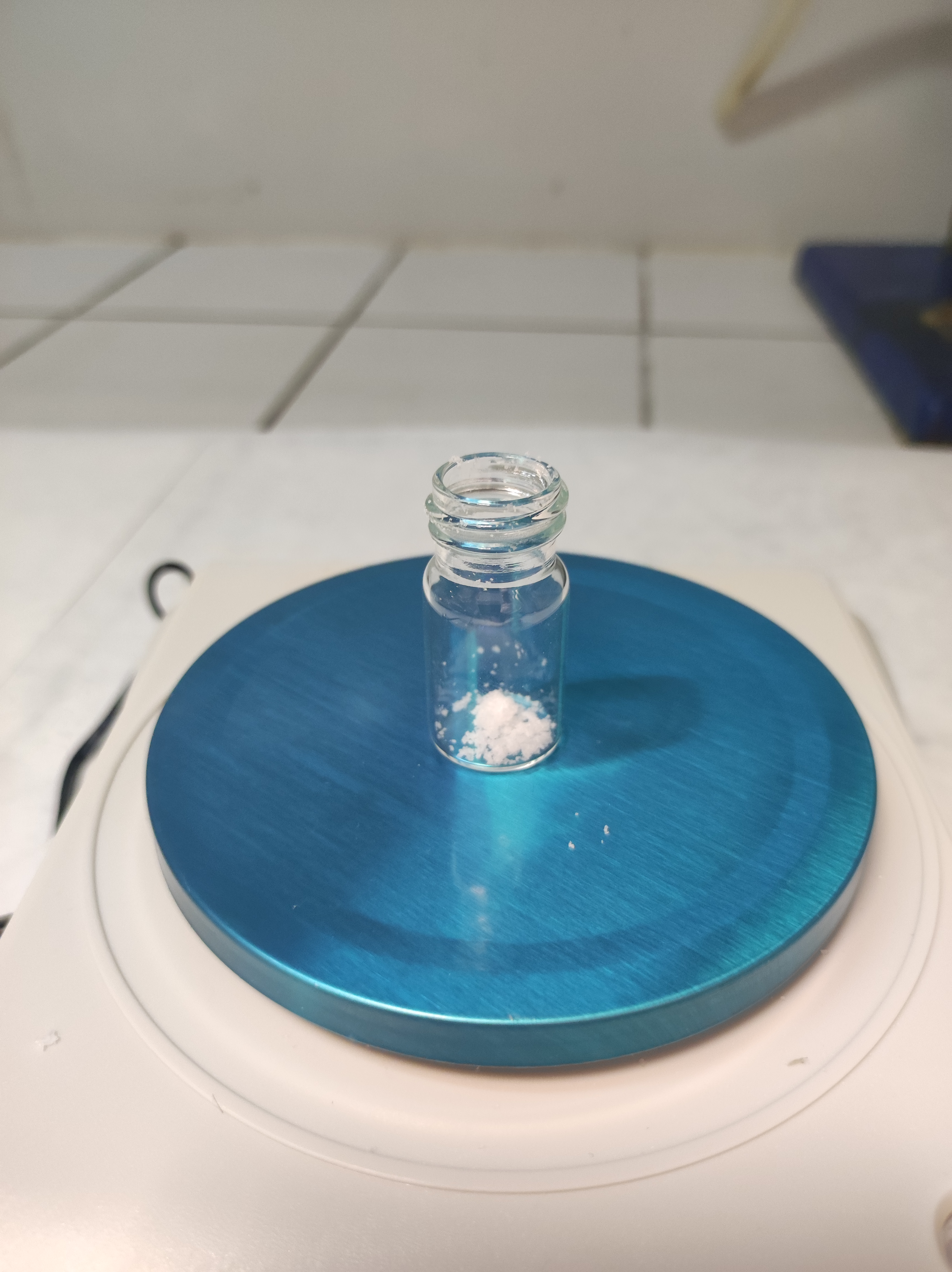

Names
- IUPAC name Cholest-5-en-3β-yl (9Z)-octadec-9-en-1-yl carbonate
- Systematic IUPAC name (1R,3aS,3bS,7S,9aR,9bS,11aR)-9a,11a-Dimethyl-1-[(2R)-6-methylheptan-2-yl]-2,3,3a,3b,4,6,7,8,9,9a,9b,10,11,11a-tetradecahydro-1H-cyclopenta[a]phenanthren-7-yl (9Z)-octadec-9-en-1-yl carbonate

Identifiers
CAS Number	17110-51-9
3D model (JSmol)	Interactive image; Interactive image
ChemSpider	4895486
ECHA InfoCard	100.037.421
PubChem CID	6364539
UNII	95LLB1K2WE
CompTox Dashboard (EPA)	DTXSID70889389
- InChI: InChI=1S/C46H80O3/c1-7-8-9-10-11-12-13-14-15-16-17-18-19-20-21-22-34-48-44(47)49-39-30-32-45(5)38(35-39)26-27-40-42-29-28-41(37(4)25-23-24-36(2)3)46(42,6)33-31-43(40)45/h14-15,26,36-37,39-43H,7-13,16-25,27-35H2,1-6H3/b15-14-/t37-,39+,40+,41-,42+,43+,45+,46-/m1/s1 Key: XMPIMLRYNVGZIA-TZOMHRFMSA-N; InChI=1/C46H80O3/c1-7-8-9-10-11-12-13-14-15-16-17-18-19-20-21-22-34-48-44(47)49-39-30-32-45(5)38(35-39)26-27-40-42-29-28-41(37(4)25-23-24-36(2)3)46(42,6)33-31-43(40)45/h14-15,26,36-37,39-43H,7-13,16-25,27-35H2,1-6H3/b15-14-/t37-,39+,40+,41-,42+,43+,45+,46-/m1/s1 Key: XMPIMLRYNVGZIA-TZOMHRFMBY
- SMILES: O=C(OCCCCCCCC\C=C/CCCCCCCC)O[C@@H]4C/C3=C/C[C@@H]1[C@H](CC[C@]2([C@H]1CC[C@@H]2[C@H](C)CCCC(C)C)C)[C@@]3(C)CC4; C[C@H](CCCC(C)C)[C@H]4CC[C@@]3([H])[C@]2([H])CC=C1C[C@@H](OC(OCCCCCCCC/C=C\CCCCCCCC)=O)CC[C@@](C)1[C@]([H])2CC[C@@]34C

Properties
Chemical formula	C_{46}H_{80}O_{3}
Molar mass	681.13 g/mol
- Except where otherwise noted, data are given for materials in their standard state (at 25 °C [77 °F], 100 kPa). verify (what is ?) Infobox references

Cholesteryl oleyl carbonate (COC) is an organic chemical, a carbonate ester of cholesterol and oleyl alcohol with carbonic acid. It is a liquid crystal material forming cholesteric liquid crystals with helical structure. It is a transparent liquid, or a soft crystalline material with melting point around 20 °C. It can be used with cholesteryl nonanoate and cholesteryl benzoate in some thermochromic liquid crystals.

It is used in some hair colors, make-ups, and some other cosmetic preparations.

It can be also used as a component of the liquid crystals used for liquid crystal displays.
