= Crew neck =

Shirt or sweater that has a round neckline and no collar

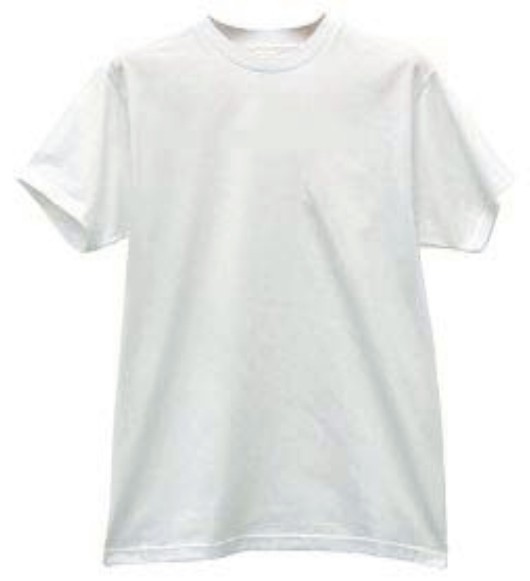
A crew-neck T-shirt

A crew neck (also spelled crewneck or crew-neck) is a type of shirt or sweater that has a round neckline and no collar and is often worn with other layers. The name dates back to as early as 1930 and was named after a type of sweater worn by rowers.

In 1913, the U.S. Navy issued crew-necked t-shirts as undergarments. The U.S. Navy was the first of the U.S. armed forces to adopt the crew-neck T-shirt, or "Gob Shirt". Military historian Michael B. Kirby claims the crew neck t-shirt was developed by Jockey International, Inc. for the USC Trojans football team in 1932.
