= B115 =

Names
- IUPAC name 1-Methyl-4-[(E)-2-naphthalen-1-ylethenyl]-3,6-dihydro-2H-pyridine

Identifiers
3D model (JSmol)	Interactive image
ChEMBL	ChEMBL1185801
ChemSpider	4771700
PubChem CID	5986405
- InChI: InChI=1S/C18H19N/c1-19-13-11-15(12-14-19)9-10-17-7-4-6-16-5-2-3-8-18(16)17/h2-11H,12-14H2,1H3/b10-9+ Key: BPVAGRSEOWNGCE-MDZDMXLPSA-N
- SMILES: CN1CCC(=CC1)/C=C/C2=CC=CC3=CC=CC=C32

Properties
Chemical formula	C_{18}H_{19}N
Molar mass	249.357 g·mol^{−1}
- Except where otherwise noted, data are given for materials in their standard state (at 25 °C [77 °F], 100 kPa). Infobox references

B115 (IUPAC name 1-methyl-4-[(E)-2-naphthalen-1-ylethenyl]-3,6-dihydro-2H-pyridine) is an inhibitor of the enzyme choline acetyltransferase (ChAT).

== In vivo activity ==
B115 inhibits human ChAT with an IC_{50} of 4.3 μM. During in vivo testing, B115 has been found to partially protect against soman, a nerve agent, but it has been suggested that this may not be due to ChAT inhibition.
