= Fluoran =

Chemical compound

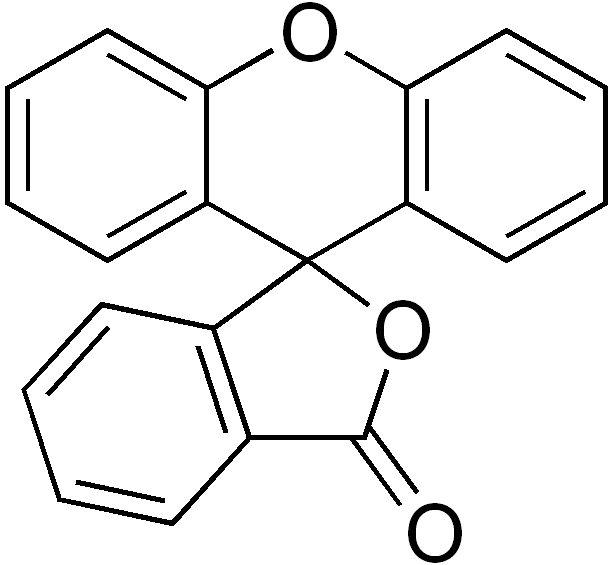

Names
- Preferred IUPAC name 3H-Spiro[[2]benzofuran-1,9′-xanthen]-3-one

Identifiers
CAS Number	596-24-7
3D model (JSmol)	Interactive image
ChEBI	CHEBI:37915
ChemSpider	62216
ECHA InfoCard	100.008.984
PubChem CID	68994
UNII	C8A6LHH76W
CompTox Dashboard (EPA)	DTXSID50208276
- InChI: InChI=1S/C20H12O3/c21-19-13-7-1-2-8-14(13)20(23-19)15-9-3-5-11-17(15)22-18-12-6-4-10-16(18)20/h1-12H Key: FWQHNLCNFPYBCA-UHFFFAOYSA-N; InChI=1/C20H12O3/c21-19-13-7-1-2-8-14(13)20(23-19)15-9-3-5-11-17(15)22-18-12-6-4-10-16(18)20/h1-12H Key: FWQHNLCNFPYBCA-UHFFFAOYAD
- SMILES: O=C2OC4(c1ccccc12)c5ccccc5Oc3ccccc34

Properties
Chemical formula	C_{20}H_{12}O_{3}
Molar mass	300.31
- Except where otherwise noted, data are given for materials in their standard state (at 25 °C [77 °F], 100 kPa). verify (what is ?) Infobox references

Fluoran is a triarylmethane dye. It is the structural core of a variety of other dyes.

These dyes have a variety of applications such as chemical stains (for example eosins) and in thermal paper. Black 305 is a common leuco dye product for thermal paper.

The chemical structure of eosin, a fluoran-based dye
