= Octadecyltrichlorosilane =

Organometallic chemical

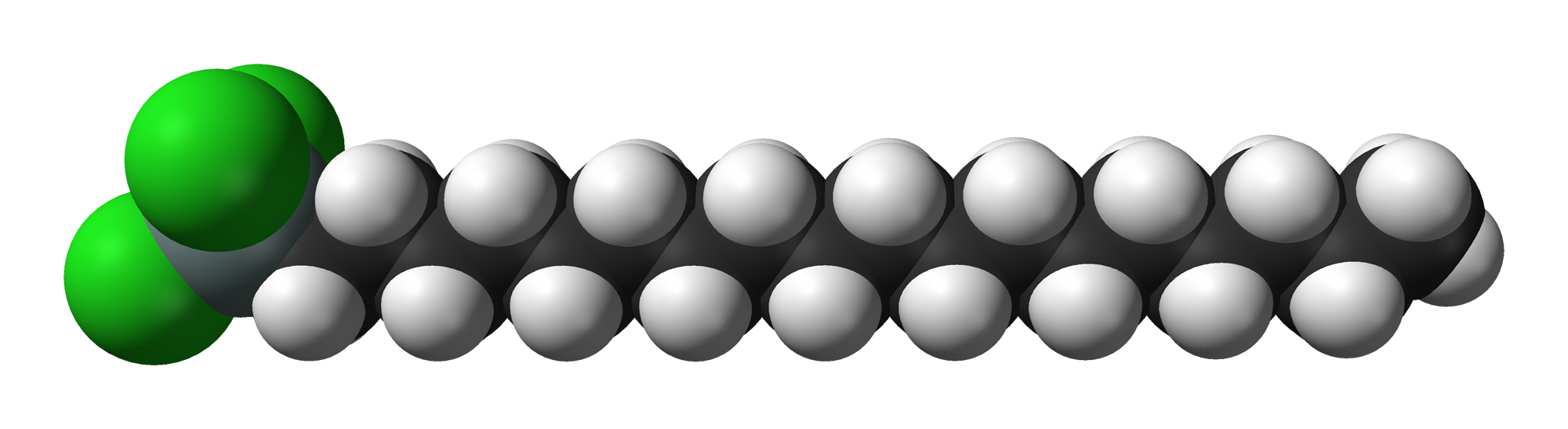

Names
- Preferred IUPAC name Trichloro(octadecyl)silane
- Other names Trichlorooctadecylsilane; Stearyltrichlorosilane

Identifiers
CAS Number	112-04-9
3D model (JSmol)	Interactive image
Abbreviations	ODTS
ChemSpider	7865
ECHA InfoCard	100.003.573
EC Number	203-930-7
PubChem CID	8157
UNII	1QLE771PKE
CompTox Dashboard (EPA)	DTXSID50868051
- InChI: InChI=1S/C18H37Cl3Si/c1-2-3-4-5-6-7-8-9-10-11-12-13-14-15-16-17-18-22(19,20)21/h2-18H2,1H3 Key: PYJJCSYBSYXGQQ-UHFFFAOYSA-N; InChI=1/C18H37Cl3Si/c1-2-3-4-5-6-7-8-9-10-11-12-13-14-15-16-17-18-22(19,20)21/h2-18H2,1H3 Key: PYJJCSYBSYXGQQ-UHFFFAOYAA
- SMILES: CCCCCCCCCCCCCCCCCC[Si](Cl)(Cl)Cl

Properties
Chemical formula	C_{18}H_{37}Cl_{3}Si
Molar mass	387.93 g·mol^{−1}
Appearance	Colorless liquid
Density	0.984 g/mL, liquid
Boiling point	223 °C (433 °F; 496 K) at 10 Torr
Solubility	organic solvents, decomp by amines and alcohols

Hazards
- Occupational safety and health (OHS/OSH)
Main hazards	flammable, corrosive
- GHS labelling
Pictograms	(GHS05: Corrosive)
Signal word	Danger
Hazard statements	H314
Precautionary statements	P280, P305+P351+P338, P310
NFPA 704 (fire diamond)	3 2 2

Related compounds
Related Chlorosilanes	Dodecyltrichlorosilane
- Except where otherwise noted, data are given for materials in their standard state (at 25 °C [77 °F], 100 kPa). verify (what is ?) Infobox references

Octadecyltrichlorosilane (ODTS or n-octadecyltrichlorosilane) is an organosilicon compound with the formula CH_{3}(CH_{2})_{17}SiCl_{3}. A colorless liquid, it is used as a silanization agent to prepare hydrophobic stationary phase, for reversed-phase chromatography.

It is also evaluated for forming self-assembled monolayers on silicon dioxide substrates. Its structural chemical formula is CH_{3}(CH_{2})_{17}SiCl_{3}. It is flammable and hydrolyzes readily with release of hydrogen chloride.

Dodecyltrichlorosilane, an ODTS analog with shorter alkyl chain, is used for the same purpose.

ODTS-PVP films are used in organic-substrate LCD displays.

== See also ==
- Octadecylsilane
