= Cholesteric liquid crystal =

Subclass of liquid crystal

Cholesteric liquid crystals (ChLCs), also known as chiral nematic liquid crystals, are a supramolecular assembly and a subclass of liquid crystal characterized by their chirality. Contrary to achiral liquid crystals, the common orientational direction of ChLCs (known as the director) is arranged in a helix whose axis of rotation is perpendicular to the director in each layer. ChLCs can be thermotropic and lyotropic. ChLCs are formed from a variety of anisotropic molecules, including chiral small molecules and polymers. ChLCs can be also formed by introducing a chiral dopant at low concentrations into achiral liquid crystalline phases.

Examples of ChLCs range from scarab beetle shells to liquid crystal displays. Many natural molecules and polymers spontaneously form the cholesteric phase. ChLCs have been used to manufacture products ranging from smart paints to textiles to and sensors. Scientists often employ biomimicry to develop ChLC-based materials inspired by natural examples.

== History ==
Cholesteryl benzoate, the first liquid crystal. Due to its chirality, cholesteryl benzoate forms the cholesteric phase.

Cholesteric liquid crystals (ChLCs) have a history dating back nearly 150 years. In 1888, the first liquid crystal — cholesteryl benzoate, a thermotropic ChLC — was discovered by Austrian botanist and chemist Friedrich Reinitzer. Although he initially believed that cholesteryl benzoate consisted of aggregates of tiny, flowing crystals, he was confounded by the presence of two melting points. The first transition (around 145-146 °C) corresponded to a phase transition to a liquid state that possessed vibrant colors, and the second high-temperature melting point (178-180 °C) changed this cloudy liquid to a clear melt. He also discovered that this process was fully reversible. These discoveries Reinitzer reported in what is recognized as the first paper on liquid crystals.

Reinitzer was a close collaborator with Otto Lehmann, along with whom Reinitzer is considered the "father" of liquid crystals. Lehmann was the inventor of the first hot stage microscope capable of studying the thermal properties of thermotropic ChLCs, which he created in 1876. One of the key features of his microscope was crossed-polarizers. Polarized light microscopy remains highly important in the study of liquid crystals, including ChLCs. While Reinitzer quickly lost interest in the substances, Lehmann continued studying his apparently "flowing crystals" on his hot stage microscope, realizing they exhibited orientationally-dependent, vibrant colors under crossed polarizers. Lehmann was the first to coin the term liquid crystal. Studies in liquid crystals soon blossomed, and in 1922 Georges Friedel created the classification system of liquid crystals still used today. In this system, he named the chiral variety of liquid crystals cholesteric, as they were discovered from a cholesterol derivative.

Liquid crystals emerged from the status of a curiosity necessitating high temperatures to function in the 1960s, with the advent of liquid crystal display technology. Although liquid crystal displays (LCDs) are typically made of nematic liquid crystals, ChLCs have been utilized in display technology. Examples include a thermal sensor range meter created by James Fergason using ChLCs in 1959, an invention which was patented in 1960. Another example is a stress-sensing card, which when applied to skin — ordinarily black — becomes blue when the wearer is relaxed and red when stressed. The technology relies on body temperature differences between relaxation and stress.

== Theory ==
=== Structure ===
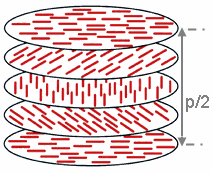
Cholesteric liquid crystals, here depicted as a half-rotation of the cholesteric helix. The liquid crystalline director is along the backbone of the long axis of the mesogen. In the cholesteric phase, the director rotates layer by layer, ultimately creating a twisted supramolecular structure.

Due to their properties intermediate between pure liquids and crystalline solids, liquid crystals are known as mesogens, a name deriving from Greek for mésos, or "intermediate". The property underpinning all liquid crystals is anisotropy (directional nonuniformity, typically manifested by an elongated rodlike shape), which under appropriate conditions (ex. high temperatures and concentrations) allows for local order around a preferred axis, named the director. Cholesteric liquid crystals are no exception. Like nematic liquid crystals, ChLCs exhibit a medium-range director along which the long axis of the liquid crystals are arranged. Unlike nematics, along a twist axis perpendicular to the director, ChLCs are arranged in layers that rotate with helical pitch p, typically defined as twice the periodicity along the twist axis.

There exist two classes of liquid crystals based on the conditions under which they form: thermotropic and lyotropic. Thermotropic liquid crystals undergo phase transitions based on temperature, whereas lyotropic liquid crystalline phases transition based on concentration within a solvent, most commonly water. For example, 5CB — a classic example of an achiral nematic thermotropic LC — undergoes an isotropic-nematic transition at 308K and a nematic-crystalline transition at 252K. Similarly, poly(n-hexyl isocyanate), a lyotropic liquid crystal, undergoes the analogous isotropic-nematic transition at weight fractions ranging from 0.225 to 0.438 in toluene, depending on molecular weight of the polymer. Cholesteric liquid crystals comprise both classes. Both small molecules and polymers can form cholesteric liquid crystals. In nature, examples include DNA, chitin, cellulose, and collagen, among others.

The local ordering in both nematic and ChLCs can be characterized according to the local nematic order parameter S. This parameter is formulated according to the following equation, a rank-2 tensor:

$S_{\alpha \beta} (\mathbf{r}) = \frac{1}{N} \sum_{i} \left( v_{\alpha}^{(i)} \otimes v_{\beta}^{(i)} - \frac{1}{3} \delta_{\alpha \beta} \right)$

Here, for an anisotropic molecule, the nematic order tensor is a function of number of molecules N, the outer product of the unit vector along the long axis v(i), and a traceless correction term, the Kronecker delta δ. The largest eigenvalue of the resulting tensor is the local nematic order. For an isotropic sample, the nematic order will be calculated as 0. For a fully-ordered sample, the nematic order approaches 1. Typically, the cholesteric pitch ranges in values from as small as 100 nm to several micrometers. The orientation of the nematic director at a certain distance along the director twist axis (usually defined as the z-axis in Cartesian coordinates) is:

$n_x = \cos(qz)$$n_y = \sin(qz)$$n_z = 0$

Here, q is defined as the helicity of a ChLC, $\frac{2\pi}{p}$. The helicity is positive for a right-handed cholesteric helix, and negative for left-handed helices. The origin of the helical pitch can be described with Frank-Oseen elastic free energy density:

$f_{FO} = \frac{1}{2} K_1 (\text{div} \, \mathbf{n})^2 + \frac{1}{2} K_2 (\mathbf{n} \cdot \text{curl} \, \mathbf{n} + q)^2 + \frac{1}{2} K_3 (\mathbf{n} \times \text{curl} \, \mathbf{n})^2$

Where div is the divergence for a vector field n (representing the individual molecular long-axis vectors) and curl is the curl of the same vector field. In 3D space, with unit vectors i, j, and k along each coordinate axis. The constants K are known as Frank elastic constants, and are empirical. By minimizing the free energy, we obtain an expression for the cholesteric helicity q.

=== Inducement of chirality ===
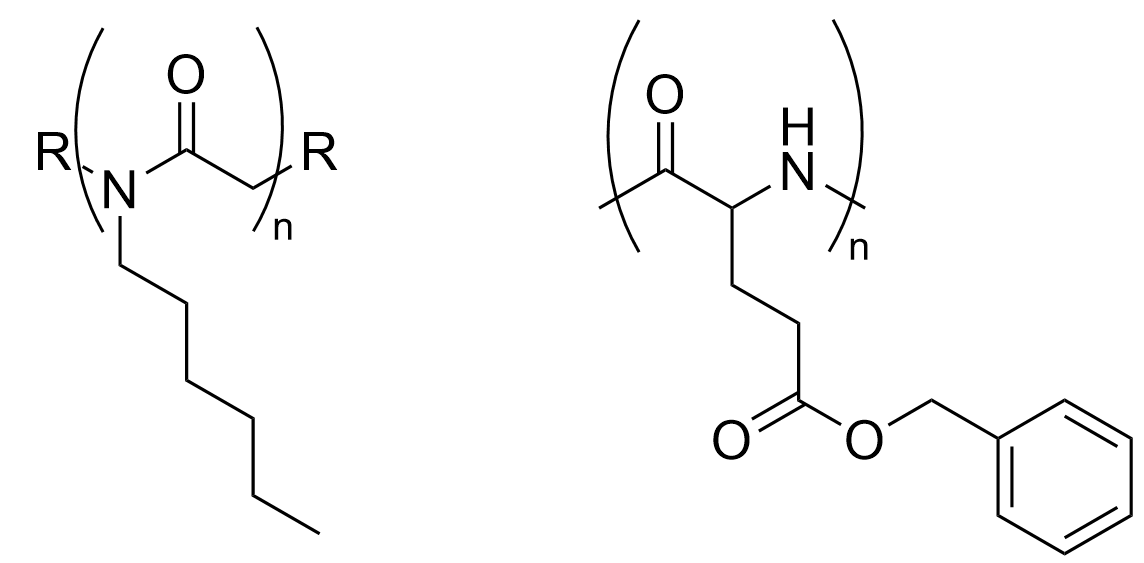
Polymeric liquid crystals; left: PHIC, right: PBLG. Since PBLG is synthesized from homochiral monomers, it forms a strong α-helix via hydrogen bonding and readily forms cholesteric phases, whereas PHIC can helix-flip and requires a dopant to form the cholesteric phase

ChLCs can form either from intrinsically chiral molecules or polymers or can be formed via chiral-dopant mediated processes. An example of a chiral-dopant mediated process is poly(n-hexyl isocyanate) (PHIC). PHIC, which is a helical polymer that is typically racemic and exhibits a nematic liquid crystalline phase due to the presence of dynamic helix-flips (i.e. where the helix flips its handedness), becomes cholesteric when exposed to a small amount of chiral dopant. The mechanism by which this transition occurs is via the slight displacement of the racemic mixture to a small enantiomeric excess, which then drives the formation of cholesteric helices.

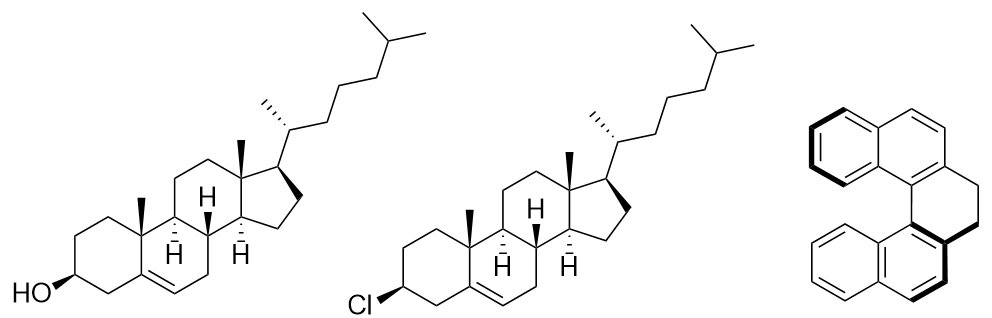
Some dopants; from left to right: cholesterol, cholesteryl chloride, bridged biaryls

Different chiral dopants may be quantitatively compared using their empirical helical twisting power:

$\beta_M=\frac{1}{PC}$

Where C is the mole fraction of the dopant, corrected for enantiomeric purity. Dopants also induce chirality on small molecules by biasing a specific chiral spatial configuration, which has an amplifying effect that ultimately leads to the formation of a chiral phase from a small enantiomeric biasing.

An example of inherently chiral ChLCs is poly-γ-benzyl-l-glutamate (PBLG), a lyotropic liquid crystal that forms cholesteric phases without dopant. This is attributed to the strong α-helix formed between individual peptides, whose handedness arises from homochiral monomers during synthesis. Examples of small-molecule ChLCs include cholesterol-doped 5CB and 1,2-dipalmitoyl-sn-glycero-3-phosphocholine. The pitch of thermotropic ChLCs is temperature-dependent.

=== Optical Textures ===
Due to their anisotropy, liquid crystals are birefringent. Formally, this means that the index of refraction is directionally dependent, with characteristic indices defined along perpendicular optical axes. Upon incident light, these different indices break up the waves into multiple with different wavelengths.

When observed under a polarized optical microscope, ChLCs can create a number of textures due to a combination of their inherent birefringence and their relative alignment with the incident light. To relate the pitch with the observed textures, the Bragg equation is used:

$\lambda_r=npcos\phi$

Where n is the average refractive index of the birefringent material and Φ is the observation angle. Therefore, the pitch of the ChLC influences the observed texture.

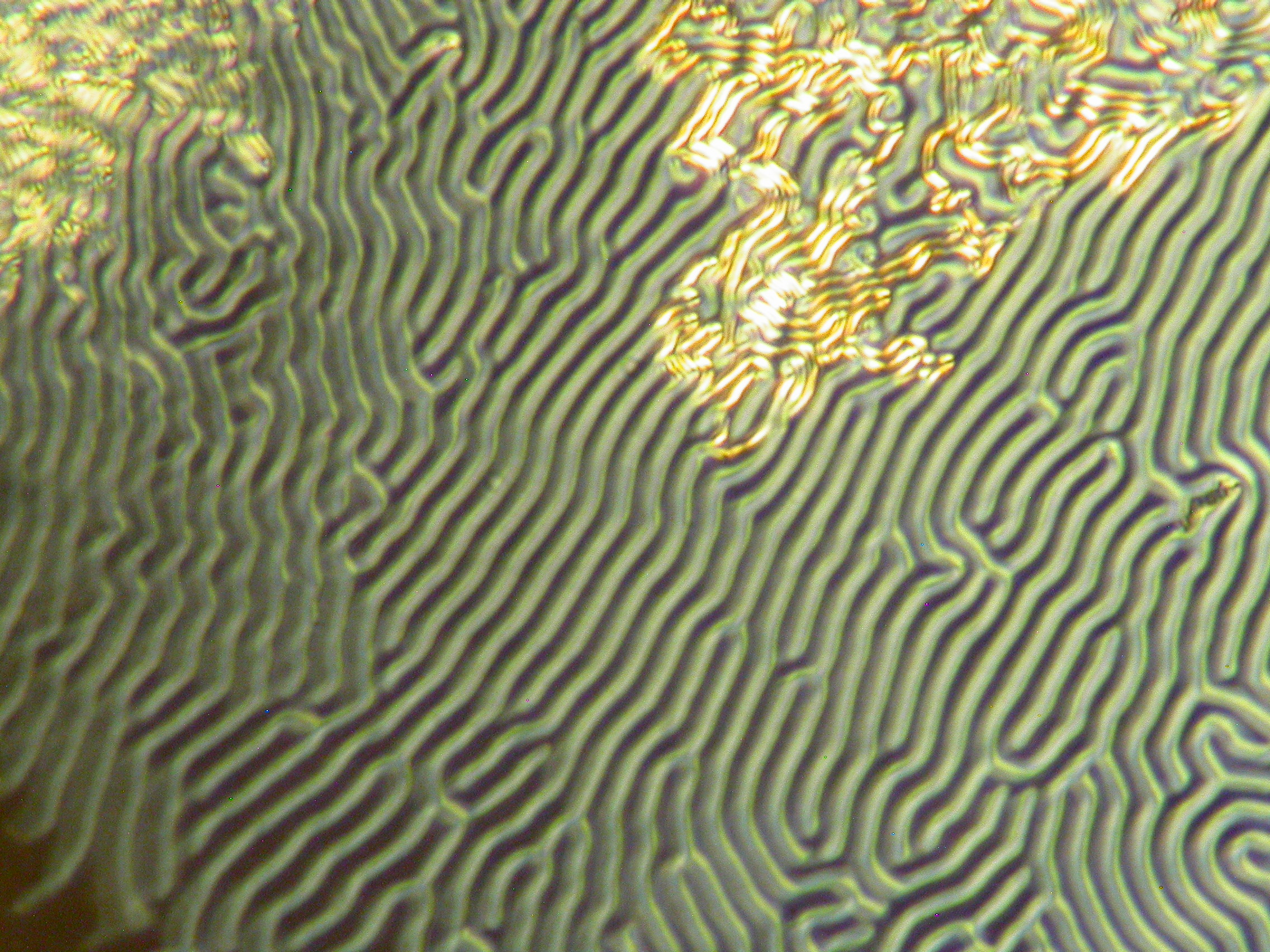
The classic fingerprint texture of a cholesteric liquid crystal. The distance between dark fringes is half the cholesteric pitch.

Among the most common textures is the oily streak texture, which was the first texture experimentally observed in cholesteryl benzoate. This texture arises when the director helix axis is parallel to the incident light, and manifests as small streaks of birefringence against a dark background under crossed polarizers. If the pitch is very short, this orientation can also give rise to the Grandjean texture. This texture appears monochromic under crossed-polarizers.

Another texture is the classical fingerprint texture, where the director helix axis is perpendicular to incident light. Here, the cholesteric helix can be easily observed and measured, as the pitch is calculated as the distance between two dark fringes. This information can be used to measure helical twisting power of the liquid crystal or monitor changes to the physical structure of the cholesteric helix in applications such as optical sensing. Particularly long pitches arranged this way give rise to the focal-conic texture.

The textures can be tuned with external stimuli. Pijper and coworkers invented a ChLCs whose pitch can be dynamically controlled via light irradiation. A chiral, photoswitchable chromophore was functionalized onto the ends of PHIC polymers, whose enantiomeric excess could be tuned with irradiation time. Upon irradiation with characteristic wavelengths of light, the texture changed from fingerprint to nematic to the opposite-handed fingerprint.

== Characterization ==
By nature, cholesteric liquid crystals share a significant number of characterization methods with achiral liquid crystalline phases. Some are highlighted:

=== Differential Scanning Calorimetry ===
Differential scanning calorimetry (DSC) is a technique that measures heat flow differences between a sample and a reference. In the case of thermotropic liquid crystals, DSC can determine the presence of phase transitions between isotropic and cholesteric, and cholesteric and other phases. This double melting point is characteristic of the liquid crystalline phase.

=== Nuclear Magnetic Resonance Spectroscopy ===
Like in nematic liquid crystals, nuclear magnetic resonance (NMR) spectroscopy can be used to probe the supramolecular structure of ChLCs. Due to the relative orientation of quadrupole moments in individual molecules, NMR can observe characteristic peak splitting that evolves with temperature and phase changes. For example, NMR studies of cholesteryl alkanoates found that cooling the isotropic phase to the smectic phase (a phase where molecules are arranged in discrete planes) via the cholesteric phase showed a singlet peak become increasingly split with decreasing temperature and increasing local order.

=== Polarized Light Microscopy ===
Chemical structure of octadecyltrichlorosilane

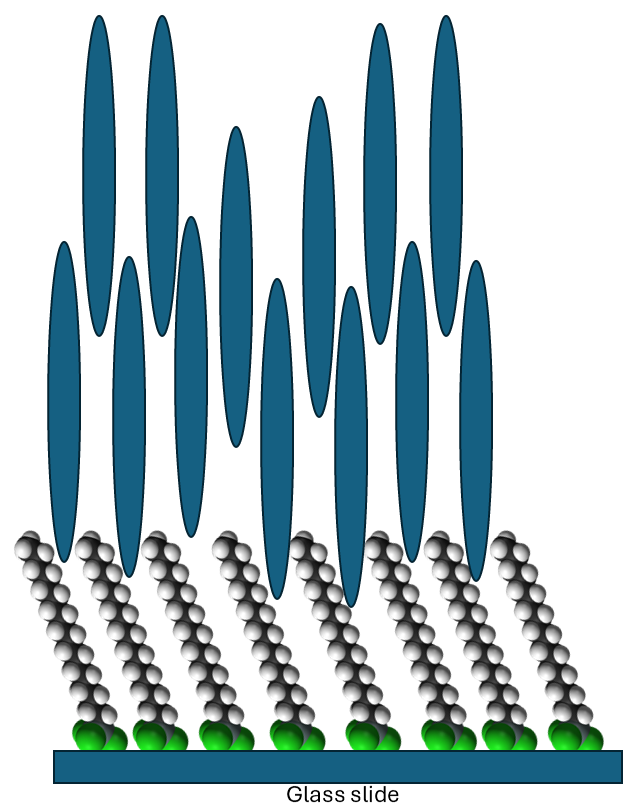
Pictographic representation of the mechanism of liquid crystal alignment via an octadecyltrichlorosilane self-assembled monolayer

Due to the birefringence of liquid crystalline samples, liquid crystals display vivid characteristic textures under cross-polarizers (note that isotropic samples will be completely dark under crossed polarizers). These textures are typically characteristic of the studied phase, meaning that ChLCs can be qualitatively identified by simple microscopy. On top of allowing for qualitative phase assignment, the cholesteric pitch can be quantitatively determined by simple measurement of the fringe displacement in the fingerprint texture.

Polarized light microscopy is widely used in studies of liquid crystals. However, textures are reliant on the surfaces by which they are confined — that is, their relative alignment with incident light. In order to provide control for alignment, adsorbents such as octadecyltrichlorosilane (OTS) have been proposed to create self-assembled monolayers on the glass surface. These monolayers then act as aligners for the bulk liquid crystalline mesophase.

=== Circular Dichroism Spectroscopy ===
Circular dichroism (CD) spectroscopy characterizes chiral materials by differential absorption of left and right handed circularly-polarized light. In the context of ChLCs, CD spectroscopy can distinguish between different helical senses — for example, a cholesteric helix that primarily transmits left-handed circularly polarized light is considered left-handed. The CD spectrum is also dependent on other quantities associated with the supramolecular helix, such as pitch and orientation/texture with respect to incident light.

== Examples and Applications ==
=== Helical Templates ===
The helical structure of ChLCs can serve as templates to induce supramolecular helical structures in otherwise-structureless dopants. When the dopant is introduced into a liquid crystalline matrix, it self-assembles into the empty spaces between helices, creating helical structures. For example, Li and coworkers templated latex nanoparticles in a matrix of cholesteric cellulose nanocrystals (CNCs). These nanoparticles arranged into the cholesteric defects, creating helicoidal nanoparticle assemblies.

=== Natural Mimics ===
ChLCs are widely present in nature. Many biological polymers such as DNA, chitin, cellulose, collagen, and certain viruses (for example, filamentous bacteriophages) can exhibit cholesteric phases naturally, or via dopant-mediated processes.

Natural selection has favored the natural development of ChLCs in some beetle shells. The classic metallic sheen of scarab beetle genera such as plusiotis arises from ChLCs — mostly chitin — in their shells. The appealing aesthetics of these insects have led scientists to pursue nature-inspired design of ChLC-based products ranging from mood rings to nail polish, mimicking scarab beetle sheen.

=== Color-Changing Films ===
Kizhakidathazhath and coworkers invented a color-changing film based on cholesteric liquid crystal elastomers (ChLCE). Formed from lyotropic ChLCs, dry films with a frozen cholesteric helix were created by rapid solvent evaporation followed by photocrosslinking of the resulting gel. This thin film is mechanochromically responsive, changing colors with stress and bending.

=== Smart Textiles ===
Kao and coworkers incorporated ChLC microspheres into a polyvinyl alcohol matrix. The composite was found to have superior mechanical properties compared to raw polyvinyl alcohol, and remained color stable even under extreme conditions, such as high electric field. The composite was able to be spun into thin fibers.

Similarly, Geng and coworkers created ChLCE-based spinnable fibers that exhibit mechanochromic responses, changing colors from red to blue with increasing strain.

=== Smart Paints ===
Ko and coworkers invented a smart color-changing paint whose color is both tunable and subsequently freezable using ultraviolet (UV) light. Starting with an achiral photopolymerizable monomer precursor, chiral dopants were added to tune the pitch (according to the aforementioned helical twisting power equation), allowing for colorimetric tuning. Upon irradiation with UV light, the monomers polymerized, creating freestanding colored films with frozen molecular arrangement. The authors were able to create red, green, and blue films using this method.
