= Thermochromism =

Property of substances to change colour due to a change in temperature

A video showing how to make thermochromatic thermal cards based on cholesteric liquid crystals

Thermochromism is the property of substances to change color due to a change in temperature. A mood ring is an example of this property used in a consumer product, although thermochromism also has more practical uses, such as for baby bottles that change to a different color when cool enough to drink, or kettles that change color when water is at or near boiling point. Thermochromism is one of several types of chromism.

== Organic materials ==
=== Leuco dyes ===
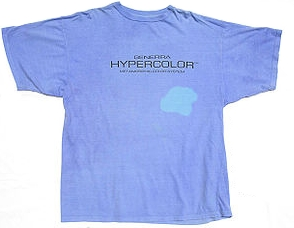
Example of a thermochromic T-shirt. A hairdryer was used to change the blue to turquoise.

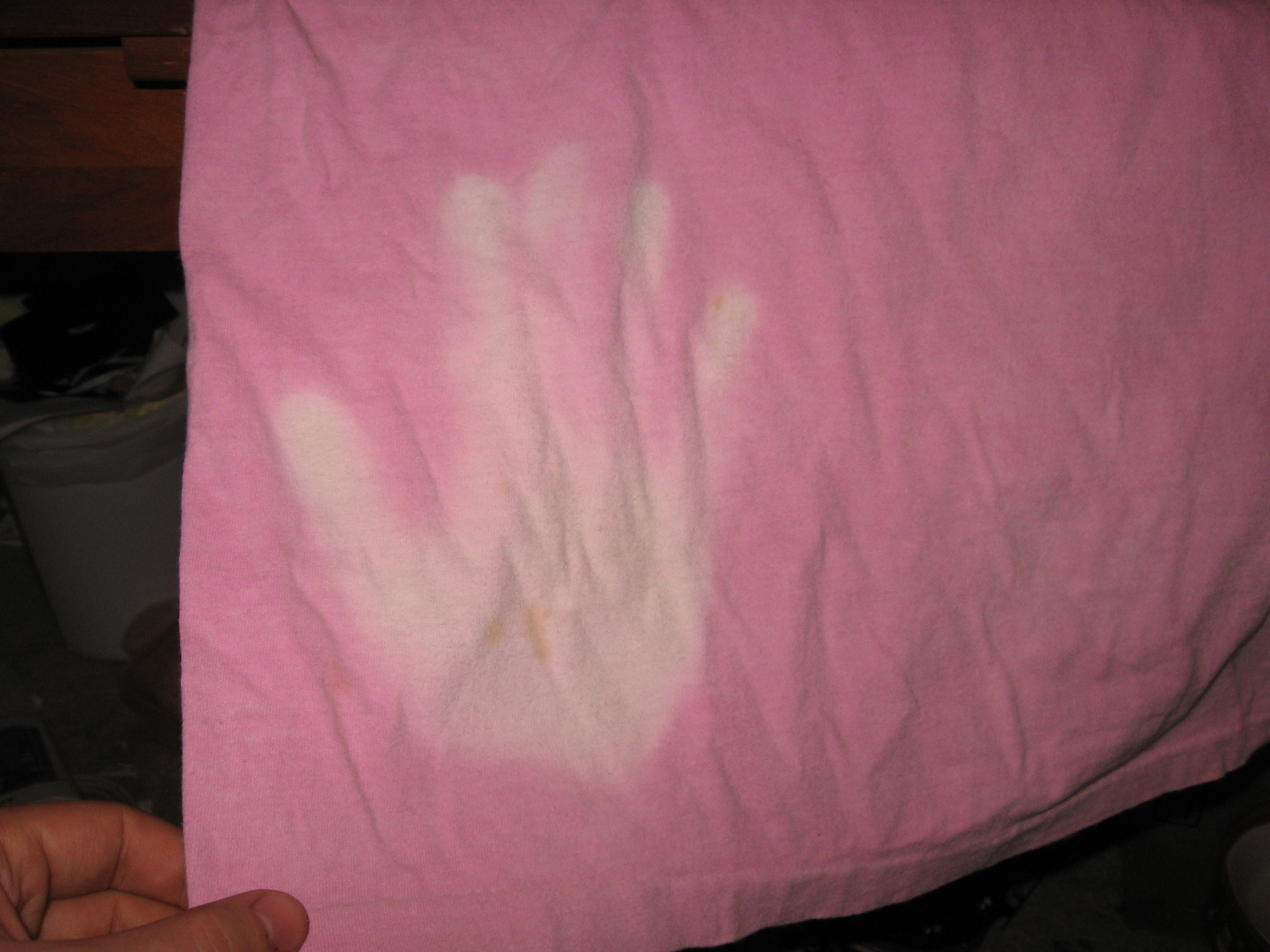
Another example of a thermochromic T-shirt.

From the applications perspective, leuco dyes are " the most important class of thermochromic compounds". The dyes are typically applied in the form of microcapsules with the mixture sealed inside. An illustrative example is the Hypercolor fashion, where microcapsules with crystal violet lactone, weak acid, and a dissociable salt dissolved in dodecanol are applied to the fabric. When the solvent is solid, the dye exists in its lactone leuco form, while when the solvent melts, the salt dissociates, the pH inside the microcapsule lowers, the dye becomes protonated, its lactone ring opens, and its absorption spectrum shifts drastically, therefore it becomes deeply violet. Dyes most commonly used are spirolactones, fluorans, spiropyrans, and fulgides.

=== Thermochromatic liquid crystals ===
Demonstration of the phenomenon of discontinuous thermochromism

Demonstration of the phenomenon of continuous thermochromism

Thermochromic liquid crystals are used in precision applications, as their responses can be engineered to accurate temperatures. Their color range is limited by their principle of operation. Some liquid crystals are capable of displaying different colors at different temperatures as illustrated by liquid crystal-based thermometers that are black at low temperature and red or blue when warm.This change is dependent on selective reflection of certain wavelengths by the crystallic structure of the material, as it changes between the low-temperature crystallic phase, through anisotropic chiral or twisted nematic phase, to the high-temperature isotropic liquid phase. Only the nematic mesophase has thermochromic properties; this restricts the effective temperature range of the material.

The twisted nematic phase has the molecules oriented in layers with regularly changing orientation, which gives them periodic spacing. The light passing through the crystal undergoes Bragg diffraction on these layers, and the wavelength with the greatest constructive interference is reflected back, which is perceived as a spectral color. A change in the crystal temperature can result in a change of spacing between the layers and therefore in the reflected wavelength. The color of the thermochromic liquid crystal can therefore continuously range from non-reflective (black) through the spectral colors to black again, depending on the temperature. Typically, the high temperature state will reflect blue-violet, while the low-temperature state will reflect red-orange. Since blue is a shorter wavelength than red, this indicates that the distance of layer spacing is reduced by heating through the liquid-crystal state.

Some such materials are cholesteryl nonanoate or cyanobiphenyls.

Mixtures with 3–5 °C (37–41 °F) span of temperatures and ranges from about 17–23 °C (63–73 °F) to about 37–40 °C (99–104 °F) can be composed from varying proportions of cholesteryl oleyl carbonate, cholesteryl nonanoate, and cholesteryl benzoate. For example, the mass ratio of 65:25:10 yields range of 17–23 °C (63–73 °F), and 30:60:10 yields range of 37–40 °C (99–104 °F).

Liquid crystals used in dyes and inks often come microencapsulated, in the form of suspensions.

Liquid crystals are used in applications where the color change has to be accurately defined. They find applications in thermometers for room, refrigerator, aquarium, and medical use, and in indicators of level of propane in tanks. A popular application for thermochromic liquid crystals are mood rings.

Liquid crystals are difficult to work with and require specialized printing equipment. The material itself is also typically more expensive than alternative technologies. High temperatures, ultraviolet radiation, some chemicals and/or solvents have a negative impact on their lifespan.

==== Papers ====
Thermochromic papers are used for thermal printers, e.g. for cash register receipts. In one manifestation, the paper is impregnated with the solid mixture of a fluoran dye and octadecylphosphonic acid. This mixture is stable in solid phase; however, when the octadecylphosphonic acid is melted, the dye undergoes a chemical reaction in the liquid phase, and assumes the protonated colored form. This state is then conserved when the matrix solidifies again, if the cooling process is fast enough. As the leuco form is more stable in lower temperatures and solid phase, the records on thermochromic papers slowly fade out over years.

==== Polymers ====
Thermochromism can appear in thermoplastics, duroplastics, gels or any kind of coatings. The polymer itself, an embedded thermochromic additive or a high ordered structure built by the interaction of the polymer with an incorporated non-thermochromic additive can be the origin of the thermochromic effect. Furthermore, from the physical point of view, the origin of the thermochromic effect can be multifarious. So it can come from changes of light reflection, absorption and/or scattering properties with temperature. The application of thermochromic polymers for adaptive solar protection is of great interest. For instance, polymer films with tunable thermochromic nanoparticles, reflective or transparent to sunlight depending on the temperature, have been used to create windows that optimize to the weather. A function by design strategy, e.g. applied for the development of non-toxic thermochromic polymers, has come into the focus in the last decade.

==== Inks ====
Thermochromic inks or dyes are well developed technologies. Some consist of microencapsulated leuco dyes. temperature sensitive compounds, developed in the 1970s, that temporarily change color with exposure to heat. They come in two forms, liquid crystals and leuco dyes. Leuco dyes are easier to work with and allow for a greater range of applications. These applications include: flat thermometers, battery testers, clothing, and the indicator on bottles of maple syrup that change color when the syrup is warm. The thermometers are often used on the exterior of aquariums, or to obtain a body temperature via the forehead. Coors Light uses thermochromic ink on its cans, changing from white to blue to indicate the can is cold.

== Inorganic materials ==
The dramatic color changes in inorganic materials can be related to structural changes, such as change in the coordination sphere for chromophores. Virtually all inorganic compounds are at least subtly thermochromic. Relevant example include titanium dioxide, zinc sulfide and zinc oxide are white at room temperature, but when heated change to yellow. Similarly indium(III) oxide is yellow and darkens to yellow-brown when heated. Lead(II) oxide exhibits a similar color change on heating. Such subtle shifts linked to changes in the electronic properties (energy levels, populations) of these materials.

More dramatic examples of thermochromism are found in materials that undergo phase transition or exhibit charge-transfer bands near the visible region. Examples include:

- Cuprous mercury iodide (Cu_{2}[HgI_{4}]) undergoes a phase transition at 67 °C (153 °F), reversibly changing from a bright red solid material at low temperature to a dark brown solid at high temperature, with intermediate red-purple states. The colors are intense and seem to be caused by Cu(I)–Hg(II) charge-transfer complexes.
- Silver mercury iodide (Ag_{2}[HgI_{4}]) is yellow at low temperatures and orange above 47–51 °C (117–124 °F), with intermediate yellow-orange states. The colors are intense and seem to be caused by Ag(I)–Hg(II) charge-transfer complexes.
- Mercury(II) iodide is a crystalline material which at 126 °C (259 °F) undergoes reversible phase transition from red alpha phase to pale yellow beta phase.
- Bis(dimethylammonium) tetrachloronickelate(II) ([(CH_{3})_{2}NH_{2}]_{2}NiCl_{4}) is a raspberry-red compound, which becomes blue at about 110 °C (230 °F). On cooling, the compound becomes a light yellow metastable phase, which over 2–3 weeks turns back into original red. Many other tetrachloronickelates are also thermochromic.
- Bis(diethylammonium) tetrachlorocuprate(II) ([(CH_{3}CH_{2})_{2}NH_{2}]_{2}CuCl_{4}) is a bright green solid material, which at 52–53 °C (126–127 °F) reversibly changes color to yellow. The color change is caused by relaxation of the hydrogen bonds and subsequent change of geometry of the copper-chlorine complex from planar to deformed tetrahedral, with appropriate change of arrangement of the copper atom's d-orbitals. There is no stable intermediate, the crystals are either green or yellow.
- Chromium(III) oxide and aluminium(III) oxide in a 1:9 ratio is red at room temperature and grey at 400 °C (752 °F), due to changes in its crystal field.

Few or no commercial applications exist for inorganic thermochromic materials, in contrast to organic species discussed above. Vanadium dioxide has been investigated for use as a "spectrally-selective" window coating to block infrared transmission and reduce the loss of building interior heat through windows. This material behaves like a semiconductor at lower temperatures, allowing more transmission, and like a conductor at higher temperatures, providing much greater reflectivity. The phase change between transparent semiconductive and reflective conductive phase occurs at 68 °C (154 °F); doping the material with 1.9% of tungsten lowers the transition temperature to 29 °C (84 °F).

Other thermochromic solid semiconductor materials include:

- Cd_{x}Zn_{1−x}S_{y}Se_{1−y}; x,y = 0.5–1
- Zn_{x}Cd_{y}Hg_{1−x−y}O_{a}S_{b}Se_{c}Te_{1−a−b−c}; x,a,c = 0–0.5, y,b = 0.5–1
- Hg_{x}Cd_{y}Zn_{1−x−y}S_{b}Se_{1−b}; x,y = 0–1, b = 0.5–1

Many tetraorganodiarsine, -distibine, and -dibismuthine compounds are strongly thermochromic. The color changes arise because they form van der Waals chains when cold, and the intermolecular spacing is sufficiently short for orbital overlap. The energy levels of the resulting bands then depend on the intermolecular distance, which varies with temperature.

Some minerals are thermochromic as well; for example, some chromium-rich pyropes, normally reddish-purplish, become green when heated to about 80 °C (176 °F).

=== Irreversible inorganic thermochromes ===
Some materials change color irreversibly. These can be used for, e.g., laser marking of materials.

- Copper(I) iodide is a solid pale tan material transforming at 60–62 °C (140–144 °F) to orange color.
- Ammonium metavanadate is a white material, turning to brown at 150 °C (302 °F) and then to black at 170 °C (338 °F).
- Manganese violet (Mn(NH_{4})_{2}P_{2}O_{7}) is a violet material, a popular pigment, turning to white at 400 °C (752 °F).

== Applications in buildings ==
Thermochromic materials, in the form of coatings, can be applied in buildings as a technique of passive energy retrofit. Thermochromic coatings are characterized as active, dynamic and adaptive materials that can adjust their optical properties according to external stimuli, usually temperature. Thermochromic coatings modulate their reflectance as a function of their temperature, making them an appropriate solution for combating cooling loads, without diminishing the building's thermal performance during the winter period.

Thermochromic materials are categorized into two subgroups, dye-based and non-dye-based thermochromic materials. However, the only class of dye-based thermochromic materials that are widely, commercially available and have been applicated and tested into buildings, are the leuco dyes.
