= Cholesteryl benzoate =

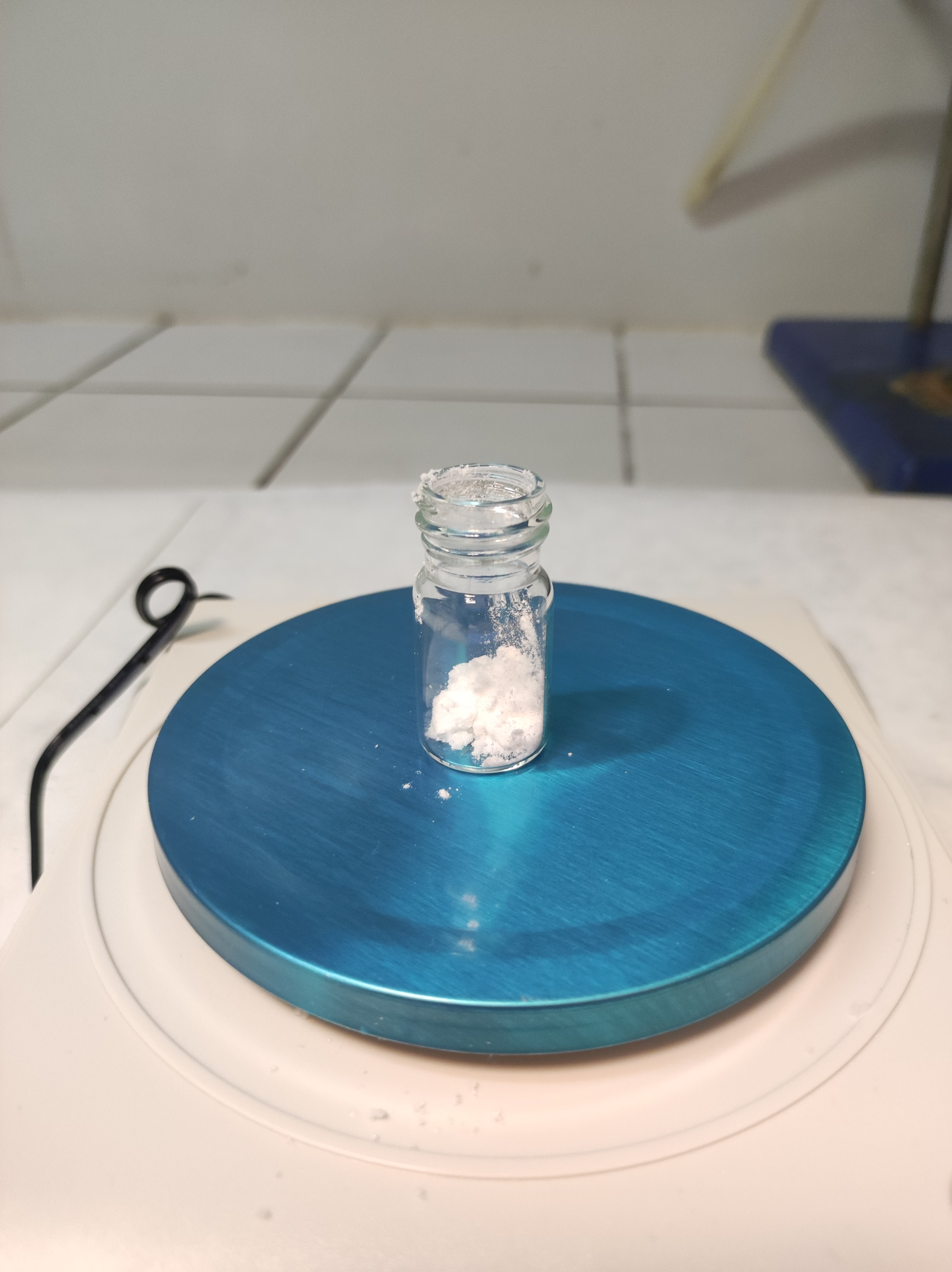

Names
- IUPAC name Cholest-5-en-3β-yl benzoate
- Systematic IUPAC name (1R,3aS,3bS,7S,9aR,9bS,11aR)-9a,11a-Dimethyl-1-[(2R)-6-methylheptan-2-yl]-2,3,3a,3b,4,6,7,8,9,9a,9b,10,11,11a-tetradecahydro-1H-cyclopenta[a]phenanthren-7-yl benzoate

Identifiers
CAS Number	604-32-0
3D model (JSmol)	Interactive image; Interactive image
ChemSpider	2005815
ECHA InfoCard	100.009.150
PubChem CID	2723613
UNII	N09H13SHLB
CompTox Dashboard (EPA)	DTXSID10897509
- InChI: InChI=1S/C34H50O2/c1-23(2)10-9-11-24(3)29-16-17-30-28-15-14-26-22-27(36-32(35)25-12-7-6-8-13-25)18-20-33(26,4)31(28)19-21-34(29,30)5/h6-8,12-14,23-24,27-31H,9-11,15-22H2,1-5H3/t24-,27+,28+,29-,30+,31+,33+,34-/m1/s1 Key: UVZUFUGNHDDLRQ-LLHZKFLPSA-N; InChI=1/C34H50O2/c1-23(2)10-9-11-24(3)29-16-17-30-28-15-14-26-22-27(36-32(35)25-12-7-6-8-13-25)18-20-33(26,4)31(28)19-21-34(29,30)5/h6-8,12-14,23-24,27-31H,9-11,15-22H2,1-5H3/t24-,27+,28+,29-,30+,31+,33+,34-/m1/s1 Key: UVZUFUGNHDDLRQ-LLHZKFLPBM
- SMILES: c1ccccc1C(=O)O[C@@H]2C/C3=C/C[C@@H]4[C@@H]([C@@]3(C)CC2)CC[C@@]5(C)[C@H]4CC[C@@H]5[C@H](C)CCCC(C)C; C(C)CCCC[C@@H](C)[C@H]1CC[C@H]2[C@@H]3CC=C4C[C@@H](OC(=O)c5ccccc5)CC[C@]4C)[C@H]3CC[C@]12C

Properties
Chemical formula	C_{34}H_{50}O_{2}
Molar mass	490.76 g/mol
Melting point	149 to 150 °C (300 to 302 °F; 422 to 423 K)
- Except where otherwise noted, data are given for materials in their standard state (at 25 °C [77 °F], 100 kPa). verify (what is ?) Infobox references

Cholesteryl benzoate, also called 5-cholesten-3-yl benzoate, is an organic chemical, an ester of cholesterol and benzoic acid. It is a liquid crystal material forming cholesteric liquid crystals with helical structure.

It can be used with cholesteryl nonanoate and cholesteryl oleyl carbonate in some thermochromic liquid crystals.

It is used in some hair colors, make-ups, and some other cosmetic preparations.

It can be also used as a component of the liquid crystals used for liquid crystal displays.

Cholesteryl benzoate was the first material in which liquid crystal properties were discovered. In the late 1880s Friedrich Reinitzer, an Austrian botanist, while studying the chemicals in plants, heated cholesteryl benzoate. At 145 °C the material melted, yielding a cloudy fluid, which changed to the originally expected clear liquid at 178.5 °C. In 1888, the German physicist Otto Lehmann concluded the cloudy fluid presents a new phase of matter, and coined the term liquid crystal.

== See also ==
- Chemical crystallography before X-rays
