= 4-Cyano-4'-pentylbiphenyl =

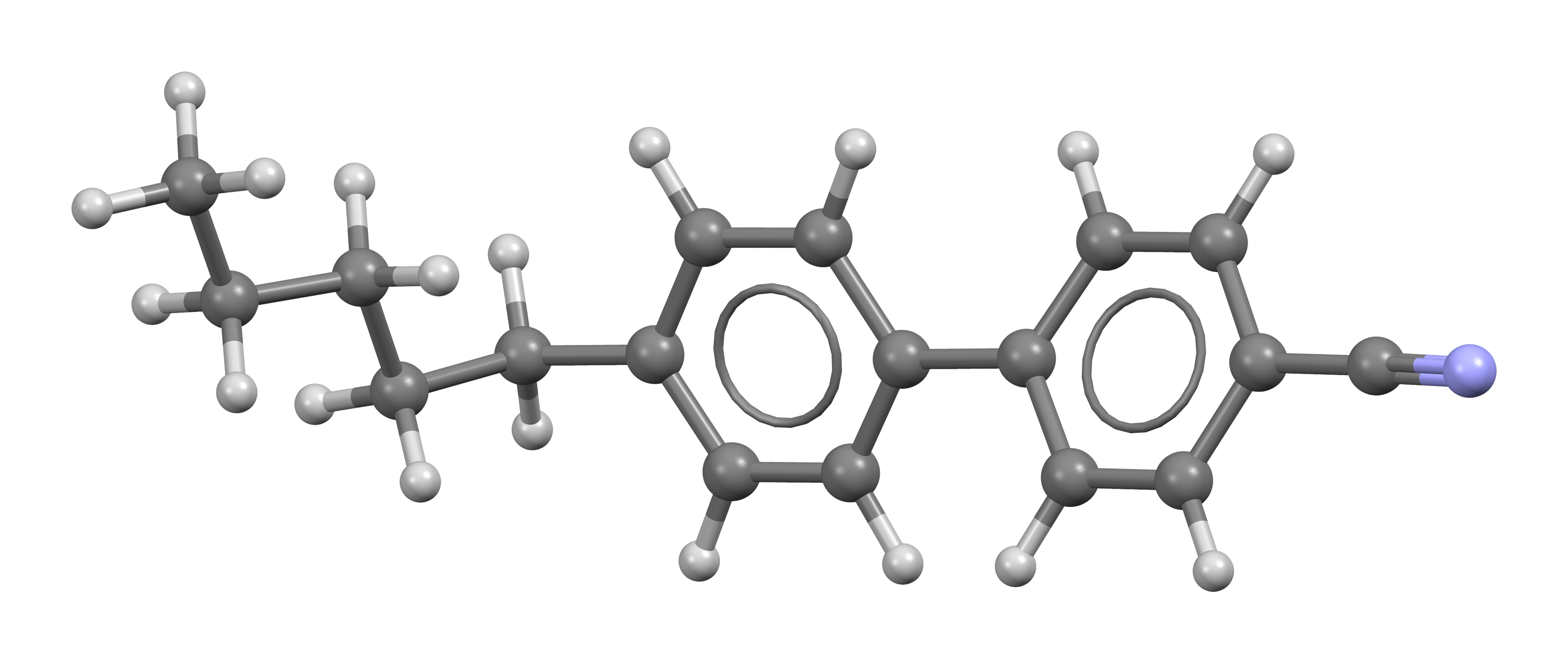

Names
- Preferred IUPAC name 4′-Pentyl[1,1′-biphenyl]-4-carbonitrile
- Other names 4'-Amyl-4-biphenylcarbonitrile, 4'-Pentyl-4-biphenylcarbonitrile, 4-Amyl-4'-cyanobiphenyl

Identifiers
CAS Number	40817-08-1
3D model (JSmol)	Interactive image
ChemSpider	83347
ECHA InfoCard	100.050.068
EC Number	255-093-2
PubChem CID	92319
UNII	2R6RYG3ZGM
CompTox Dashboard (EPA)	DTXSID3068255
- InChI: InChI=1S/C18H19N/c1-2-3-4-5-15-6-10-17(11-7-15)18-12-8-16(14-19)9-13-18/h6-13H,2-5H2,1H3 Key: HHPCNRKYVYWYAU-UHFFFAOYSA-N; InChI=1/C18H19N/c1-2-3-4-5-15-6-10-17(11-7-15)18-12-8-16(14-19)9-13-18/h6-13H,2-5H2,1H3 Key: HHPCNRKYVYWYAU-UHFFFAOYAV
- SMILES: N#Cc1ccc(cc1)c2ccc(cc2)CCCCC

Properties
Chemical formula	C_{18}H_{19}N
Molar mass	249.357 g·mol^{−1}
Appearance	Colorless if isotropic or cloudy white if nematic
Density	1.022 g/cm^{3}
Melting point	22.5 °C (72.5 °F; 295.6 K)
Refractive index (n_{D})	n_{//} = 1.71, n_{⟂} = 1.53
Viscosity	28 mPa·s

Hazards
- GHS labelling
Pictograms	(GHS07: Exclamation mark)
Signal word	Warning
Hazard statements	H302, H312, H315, H319, H332, H335
Precautionary statements	P261, P264, P270, P271, P280, P301+P312, P302+P352, P304+P312, P304+P340, P305+P351+P338, P312, P321, P322, P330, P332+P313, P337+P313, P362, P363, P403+P233, P405, P501
NFPA 704 (fire diamond)	2 1 0
- Safety data sheet (SDS)
- Except where otherwise noted, data are given for materials in their standard state (at 25 °C [77 °F], 100 kPa). verify (what is ?) Infobox references

4-Cyano-4'-pentylbiphenyl is a commonly used nematic liquid crystal with the chemical formula C_{18}H_{19}N. It frequently goes by the common name 5CB. 5CB was first synthesized by George William Gray, Ken Harrison, and J.A. Nash at the University of Hull in 1972 and at the time it was the first member of the cyanobiphenyls. The liquid crystal was discovered after Gray's group received a grant from the UK Ministry of Defence to find a liquid crystal that had liquid crystal phases near room temperature with the specific intention of using them in liquid crystal displays. The molecule is about 20 Å long. The liquid crystal 5CB undergoes a phase transition from a crystalline state to a nematic state at 22.5 °C and it goes from a nematic to an isotropic state at 35.0 °C.

== Production ==
5CB is produced by modifying biphenyl in a linear manner. First Br_{2} is added to the biphenyl to introduce a bromine atom to the end of the moiety. Next aluminium chloride and C_{4}H_{9}COCl is added to the sample, followed by the addition of potassium hydroxide and NH_{2}NH_{2}. By this point the molecule will have a bromine atom on one end of the rigid core and C_{5}H_{11} on the other end. Finally, introduction of copper(I) cyanide and DMF results in the removal of the bromine and its replacement with CN, yielding 5CB.
