= Anisotropic conductive film =

Adhesive that is commonly used in liquid crystal display manufacturing

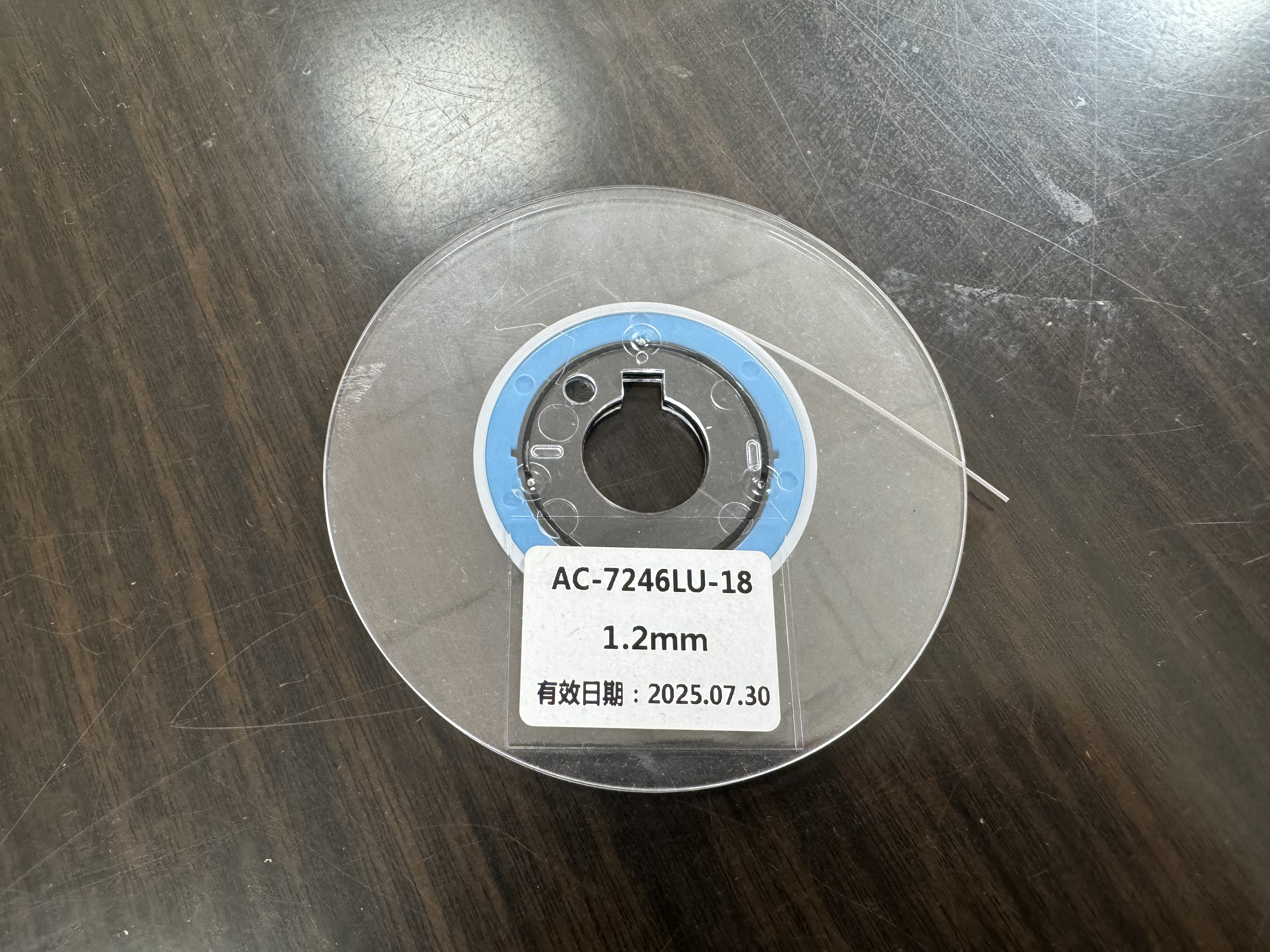
A reel of ACF film

Anisotropic conductive film (ACF) is an adhesive interconnect system that is commonly used in panel display manufacturing, including liquid crystal displays (LCDs) and organic light-emitting diode (OLED) technology. In display manufacturing, ACF facilitates the electrical and mechanical connections between the driver electronics and substrates.

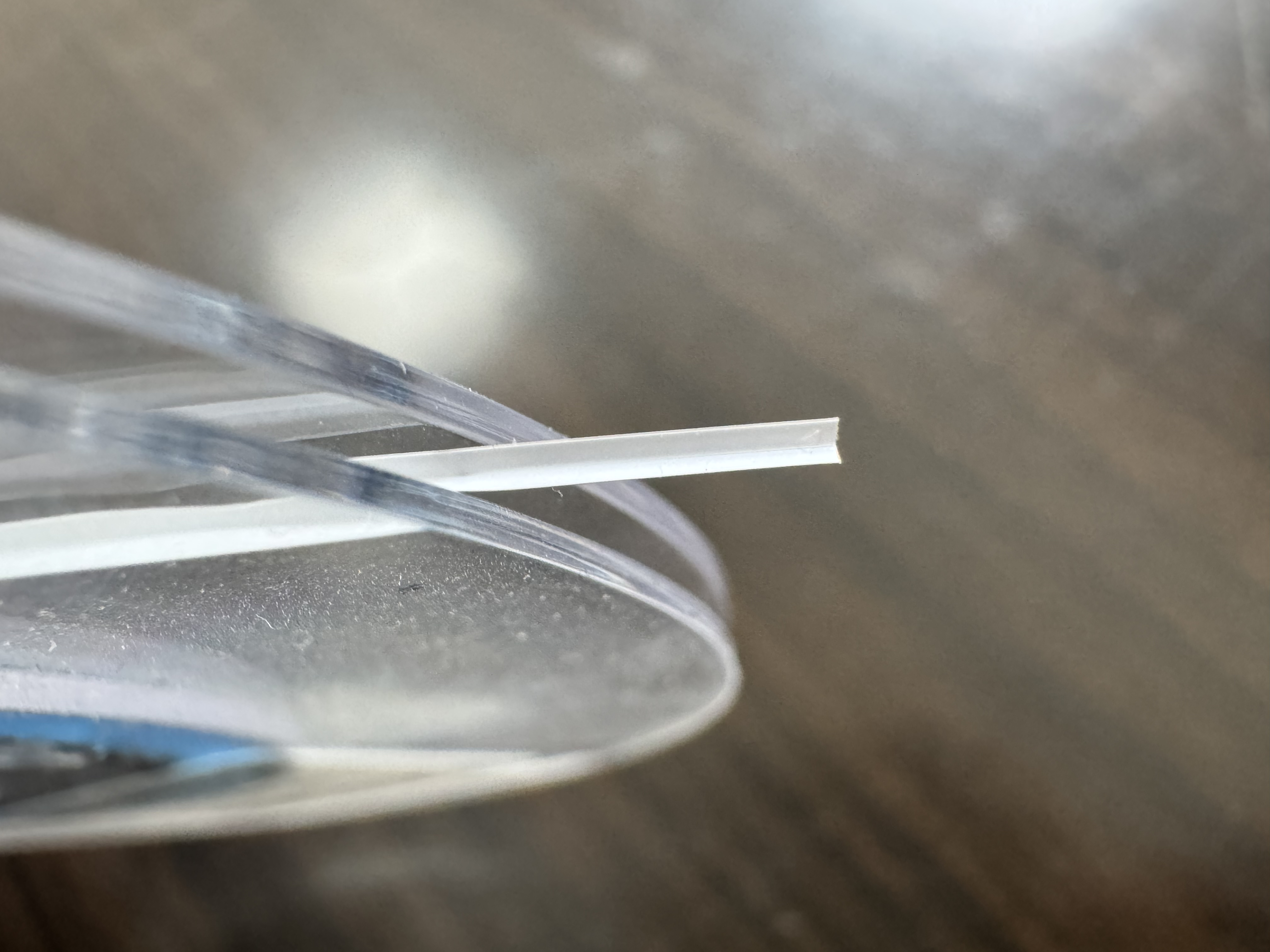
1.2mm width ACF film

The material is also available in a paste form referred to as anisotropic conductive paste (ACP), and both are grouped together as anisotropic conductive adhesives (ACAs). ACAs have more recently been used to perform the flex-to-board or flex-to-flex connections used in handheld electronic devices such as mobile phones, MP3 players, or in the assembly of CMOS camera modules.

== History ==
ACAs developed in the late 1970s and early 1980s, with heat seal connectors by Nippon Graphite Industries, and ACFs by Hitachi Chemicals and Dexerials (formerly known as Sony Chemicals & Information Devices). ACA technology evolved alongside OLED technology, particularly as OLED gained momentum in the late 2000s. During this time, ACA adapted to meet OLED's electrical and circuit design requirements, enabling its broader adoption in devices such as smartphones, TVs, and flexible displays. Currently there are many manufacturers of heat seal connectors and ACAs, but Hitachi and Sony continue to dominate the industry in terms of market share. Other manufacturers of ACAs include 3M, Loctite, DELO, Creative Materials, Henkel, Sun Ray Scientific, Kyocera, Three Bond, Panacol, and Btech.

In the very early years, ACAs were made from rubber, acrylic, and other adhesive compounds, but they rapidly converged on several different variations of thermoset biphenyl type epoxy resins. The temperatures required were relatively high at 170-180C, however, and the market leaders Sony and Hitachi developed and released acrylic-based materials in the early 2000s that brought the curing temperatures down below 150C while keeping the curing times in the 10–12 second range. Further advances in the acrylic compounds used decreased the curing cycle times to below 5 seconds in many cases, which is where they remain as of this writing. Specification sheets are available at all of the manufacturers' sites listed above.

== Current market ==
ACF continues to be the most popular form factor for ACAs, largely due to the ability to precisely control the volume of material, density of the particles in any sample, and the distribution of those particles within the sample. This is particularly true in the traditional ACF stronghold of display interconnects, but ACF has also seen strong growth out of the display industry and into areas long dominated by surface-mount technologies. The ability to make interconnections in a very small XYZ space has been the key driver in this expansion, helped by the ability under certain conditions to greatly lower cost either by the reduction of component counts or total material used.

ACPs are widely used in lower-end applications, primarily in the assembly of chips on to RFID antenna substrates. They are also used in some board or flex assembly applications, but at a much lower level than ACFs. While ACPs are generally lower cost than ACFs, they cannot provide the same level of control in adhesive quantity and particle dispersion as ACF. For this reason it is very difficult to use them for high-density applications.

== Technology overview ==
ACF technology is used in chip-on-glass (COG), flex-on-glass (FOG), flex-on-board (FOB), flex-on-flex (FOF), chip-on-flex (COF), chip-on-board (COB), and similar applications for higher signal densities and smaller overall packages. ACPs are typically used only in chip-on-flex (COF) applications with low densities and cost requirements, such as for RFID antennas, or in FOF and FOB assemblies in handheld electronics. COG, in particular, also uses gold bumps to connect to the display.

In all cases the anisotropic material, for example, a thermosetting resin containing conductive particles, is first deposited on the base substrate. This may be done using a lamination process for ACF, or either a dispense or printing process for ACP. The device or secondary substrate is then placed in position over the base substrate and the two sides are pressed together to mount the secondary substrate or device to the base substrate. In many cases this mounting process is done with no heat or a minimal amount of heat that is just sufficient to cause the anisotropic material to become slightly tacky. In the case of using a thermosetting resin containing conductive particles, the particles are trapped between prominent points, such as electrodes, between the substrate and the component, thereby creating an electrical connection therebetween. Other particles are insulated by the thermosetting resin. In some cases this mounting step is skipped and the two sides go directly to the bonding portion of the process. In high volume manufacturing, however, this would lead to inefficiencies in the manufacturing process, so direct bonding is usually done only in the lab or in small scale manufacturing.

Bonding is the third and final process required to complete an ACF assembly. In the first two processes the temperatures can range from ambient to 100 °C, with the heat applied for 1 second or less. For bonding, the amount of thermal energy required is higher due to the need to first flow the adhesive and allow the two sides to come together into electrical contact, and then to cure the adhesive and create a lasting reliable bond. The temperatures, times, and pressure required for these processes can vary as shown in the following table.

Table 1: Common ACF Assembly Conditions

| Assembly Type | Adhesive Type | Time(Sec) | Temp (°C) | Pressure |
|---|---|---|---|---|
| Flex-on-Glass (FOG) | Epoxy | 10–12 | 170–200 | 2-4MPa▲ |
| Chip-on-Glass(COG) | Epoxy | 5–7 | 190–220 | 50-150MPa※ |
| Chip-on-Flex (COF) | Epoxy | 5–10 | 190–220 | 30-150MPa※ |
| Flex-on-Board (FOB) | Epoxy | 10–12 | 170–190 | 1-4MPa▲ |
| Flex-on-Board (FOB) | Acryl | 5–10 | 130–170 | 1-4MPa▲ |
| Flex-on-Flex (FOF) | Epoxy | 10–12 | 170–190 | 1-4MPa▲ |
| Flex-on-Flex (FOF) | Acryl | 5–10 | 130–170 | 1-4MPa▲ |

▲ Pressures for flex assemblies (FOG, FOB, FOF) are measured across the entire area under the bondhead.

※Pressures for chip assemblies (COG, COF) are calculated on the cumulative surface area of the bumps on the chip.

== See also ==
- Elastomeric connector, another connecting technology
- LCD
