= LCD classification =

There are various classifications of the electro-optical modes of liquid crystal displays (LCDs).

== LCD operation in a nutshell ==
The operation of TN, VA and IPS-LCDs can be summarized as follows:

- a well aligned LC configuration is deformed by an applied electric field,
- this deformation changes the orientation of the local LC optical axis with respect to the direction of light propagation through the LC layer,
- this change of orientation changes the polarization state of the light propagating through the LC layer,
- this change of the polarization state is converted into a change of intensity by dichroic absorption, usually by external dichroic polarizers.

== Activation ==
Liquid crystals can be aligned by both magnetic and electric fields. The strength of the required magnetic field is too high to be feasible for display applications.

One electro-optical effect with LCs requires a current through the LC-cell; all other practiced electro-optical effects only require an electric field (without current) for alignment of the LC.

Electro-optical effects in Liquid Crystals LCs can be aligned by electric and magnetic fields
electric field effects	electro-hydrodynamic effects
the electrical field aligns the liquid crystal no current is necessary (very low power required for operation).	current induced domain formation and scattering requires current for activation.
twisted nematic field effect	dynamic scattering mode, DMS
Visual information can be generated by the processes of: absorption (either by dichroic dyes in the LC or by external dichroic polarizers), scattering, index matching (e.g. holographic PDLCs).

== Absorption Effects ==
The state of polarization of the light traveling through the LC layer cannot be perceived by human observers, it must be converted into intensity (e.g. luminance) in order to become perceivable. This is achieved with absorption by dichroic dyes and dichroic polarizers.

Absorption Effects
internal absorption (dichroic dyes dissolved in LC), guest-host LCDs	external dichroic polarizers
non-twisted configurations with dichroic dyes	electrically controlled birefringence, ECB
twisted configurations with dichroic dyes	twisted nematic field-effect, TN
	supertwisted nematic effects, STN, the total twist is > 90° SBE (supertwisted birefringence effect); DSTN: double layer STN effect FSTN: foil-compensated supertwisted nematic effect (foil = retarder sheet)
	in-plane switching effects, IPS fringe-field switching effect, FFS
	vertically aligned effects, VA multi-domain vertical alignment, MVA patterned vertical alignment, PVA
	PI-cell (aka OCB-cell); OCB: optically compensated bend-mode
cholesteric-nematic phase-change with dichroic dyes	

== Polymer Dispersed Liquid Crystals ==
Liquid crystals with low molecular weight can be mixed with high molecular weight polymers, followed by phase-separation to form a kind of spongy matrix filled with LC droplets. An external electric field can align the LC to match its index with that of the polymer matrix, switching that cell from a milky (scattering) state to a clear transparent state. When dichroic dyes are dissolved in the LC an electric field can switch the PDLC from an absorbing state to a fairly transparent state.

When the amount of polymer is small compared to that of the LC there will be no separation of both components, but the polymer forms an anisotropic fiber-like network within the LC that stabilizes the state in which it has been formed. In such a way, certain physical properties (e.g. elasticities, viscosities, and thus threshold voltages and response times, respectively) can be controlled.

Polymer Dispersed Liquid Crystals PDLCs
absorptive dye-doped PDLCs	scattering PDLCs; holographic PCLCs
	polymer stabilized LCDs

== Bistable LCDs ==
For some applications bistability of electro-optical effects is highly advantageous, since the optical response (visual information) is maintained even after removal of the electrical activation, thus saving battery charge. These effects are beneficial when the displayed visual information is changed only in extended intervals (e.g. electronic paper, electronic price tags, etc.).

Bistable LCDs
ferroelectric LCs	cholesteric LCs	nematic LCs
bistable ferroelectric LCDs	bistable cholesteric phase-change LCDs	bistable nematic displays
		twisted-untwisted bistabilities (180°/360° twist); bistable twisted nematic effects, BTN
		zenithal bistabilities; azimuthal bistabilities

== Reduction of Variations with Viewing Direction in LCDs ==
With the direction of light propagation in the LC layer also the state of polarization of the light changes, and, as a consequence, the intensity and the spectral distribution of transmitted light changes too. In order to reduce such unwanted variations to a minimum, two approaches are used in actual LC displays: multi-domain approaches and application of external birefringent layers (retarder sheets).

Reduction of Variations with Viewing Direction in LCDs
multidomain approaches	(birefringent) retarder sheet compensation
visual averaging of microscopic regions with different viewing-direction properties	correction of unwanted effects in LC by external birefringent (polymeric) layers.

== Literature ==
- Pochi Yeh, Claire Gu, Optics of Liquid Crystal Displays, John Wiley & Sons, 1999
- D.K. Yang, S.T. Wu, Fundamentals of Liquid Crystal Devices, Wiley SID Series in Display Technology, 2006
