= Boogie board =

Boogie board may refer to:

- Bodyboard, a device for riding waves.
- Boogie board (product), an electronic device for note taking that comes in various colors
