= LCD crosstalk =

Visual defect in an LCD screen due to interference between adjacent pixels

LCD crosstalk is a visual defect in an LCD screen which occurs because of interference between adjacent pixels.

Owing to the way rows and columns in the display are addressed, and charge is pushed around, the data on one part of the display has the potential to influence what is displayed elsewhere. This is generally known as crosstalk, and in matrix displays typically occurs in the horizontal and vertical directions. Crosstalk used to be a serious problem in the old passive-matrix (STN) displays, but is rarely discernable in modern active-matrix (TFT) displays.

A fortunate side effect of inversion (see above) is that, for most display material, what little crosstalk there is largely cancelled out. For most practical purposes, the level of crosstalk in modern LCDs is negligible.

Certain patterns, particularly those involving fine dots, can interact with the inversion and reveal visible crosstalk. If you try moving a small Window in front of the inversion pattern (above) which makes your screen flicker the most, you may well see crosstalk in the surrounding pattern.

Different patterns are required to reveal crosstalk on different displays (depending on their inversion scheme).
