= LXD Incorporated =

LXD, Inc.
- Company type: Private
- Founded: 1968
- Headquarters: Cleveland, Ohio; Research Triangle, North Carolina
- Key people: Ed Harrison, CEO
- Products: Liquid Crystal Displays & Related Products
- Website: http://www.lxdinc.com

LXD, Incorporated is an American company that designs and manufactures liquid crystal displays (LCDs). It was one of the first LCD manufacturers in the world. The company, headquartered in Cleveland, Ohio, has factories in the United States and China.

LXD Research & Display LLC is in Raleigh, North Carolina.

== History ==
LXD, Incorporated was founded as ILIXCO (International Liquid Xtal Company) by James Fergason in 1968 in Kent, Ohio and was the first manufacturer of the twisted nematic LCD. ILIXCO became cash strapped while trying to break into the display market with watch and large instrument displays, and it was purchased by then-customer DICKEY-john Corp., a manufacturer of agricultural sensing equipment, in 1974. John Lamphier III, owner of DICKEY-john Corp, renamed the company Liquid Xtal Displays Inc. and later sold the company to the Electronic Components Division of General Electric in September 1979.

In December 1983, the company was purchased by Dr. Hugh Mailer, who shortened the name to LXD, Incorporated. In 1986, majority ownership of LXD was acquired by a Norwegian company, LCDVision.

In July 1994, the company became a subsidiary of the Brenlin Group.

In 1996, James Fergason's son Jeffrey Fergason formed a new company using the Ilixco name. The new Ilixco is a holding company that owns controlling interests in IO Display Systems and Razor Digital Entertainment.

In January 2008, the company was acquired by current management. A joint venture between Jiya-LXD in China was established.

In September 2010, LXD announced the opening of a new 30,000-square-foot (2,800 m^{2}) facility in Research Triangle, North Carolina.

It was a major employer in the Triangle Region in North Carolina.
