= Elastomeric connector =

Electrical signal connector

Elastomeric connectors with different Shore-Numbers (degree of hardness) for different screen sizes. 1: conductor 2: non-conductor A: rubberised flank for midsize displays B: flank of soft foamed rubber for large displays.

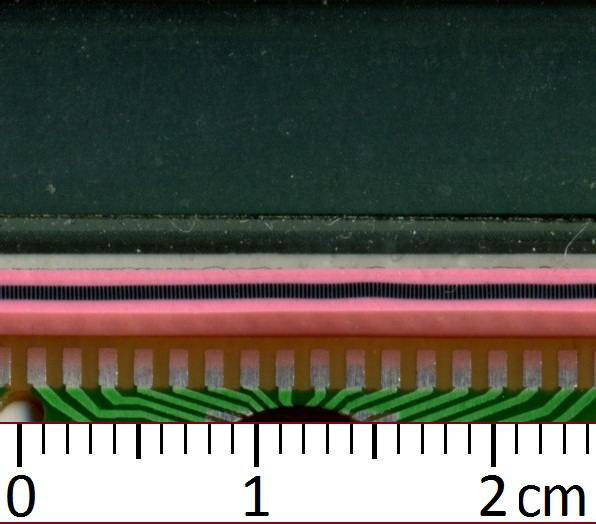
An LCD connector (units are cm)

Elastomeric connectors, also known by the registered trademark ZEBRA connectors, consist of alternating conductive and insulating regions in a rubber or elastomer matrix to produce overall anisotropic conductive properties. The original version consisted of alternating conductive and insulating layers of silicone rubber, cut crosswise to expose the thin layers. They can provide high-density redundant electrical paths for high reliability connections by spacing the conductive layers closely, so that two or more conductive layers touch each circuit board contact pad. One of the first applications was connecting thin and fragile glass liquid-crystal displays (LCDs) to circuit boards in electronic devices, as little current was required.

Because of their flexibility, they excel in shock and anti-vibration applications. They can create a gasket-like seal for harsh environments. Conductor material possibilities include carbon, silver, and gold. The length, width and height may be specified as well as the stripe pitch. Frequently a recess with ribs is specified that captures and provides the elastomer reference surface for alignment (while allowing the lateral dimension of the elastomer to increase as it is compressed) with a deflection stop to control the final part separation, and alignment pins for substrate alignment.

Elastomeric connectors are widely used, from low cost consumer products such as calculators to high reliability flight data recorders.

They are used in two ways:

- spacing of rubber conductive strips equals PCB conductor spacing, with the connector precisely aligned;
- spacing of rubber conductive strips less than half the PCB conductor spacing, without precise alignment.

A "matrix" version consists of short, fine, metallic wires, 300 to 2,000 per square centimeter, aligned parallel but not touching each other, embedded in a rubber sheet. The wires can either protrude slightly from the top and bottom of the rubber sheet, or be curved and flush with the top and bottom planes; the latter is used for repeated assembly or inspection.

== Applications ==
- LCD and electroluminescent displays
- Board-to-board connections
- Chip-to-board connections
- Memory cards

== See also ==
- Anisotropic conductive film, another connecting technology
- Silicone rubber keypad
