= Homogeneous alignment =

In liquid crystals homogeneous alignment, sometimes called planar alignment, is the state of alignment where molecules align in parallel to a substrate. The opposite method is homeotropic alignment.

For planar alignment - polyimides can be used. One of the popular ones is PI-2555.

The surface has to be rubbed by paper or by a velvet or similar cloth in order to make the alignment axis parallel to the rubbing. However the exact mechanism of this alignment is not entirely clear.
