= Homeotropic alignment =

In liquid crystals, homeotropic alignment is one of the ways of alignment of liquid crystalline molecules. Homeotropic alignment is the state in which a rod-like liquid crystalline molecule aligns perpendicularly to the substrate. In the polydomain state, the parts also are called homeotropic domains. In contrast, the state in which the molecule aligns to a substance in parallel is called homogeneous alignment.

There are various other ways of alignment in liquid crystals. Because homeotropic alignment is not anisotropic optically, a dark field is observed between crossed polarizers in polarizing optical microscopy. By conoscope observation, however, a cross image is observed in the homeotropic alignments. Homeotropic alignment often appears in the smectic A phase (S_{A}).

In discotic liquid crystals homeotropic alignment is defined as the state in which an axis of the column structure, which is formed by disc-like liquid crystalline molecules, aligns perpendicularly to a substance. In other words, this alignment looks like a state in which columns formed by piled-up coins are arranged in an orderly way on a table.

In practice, the homeotropic alignment is usually achieved by surfactants and detergent for example lecithin, some esilanes or some special polyimide (PI 1211). Generally liquid crystals align homeotropically at an air or glass interface.
