= Boogie Board =

Device for note taking

Boogie board
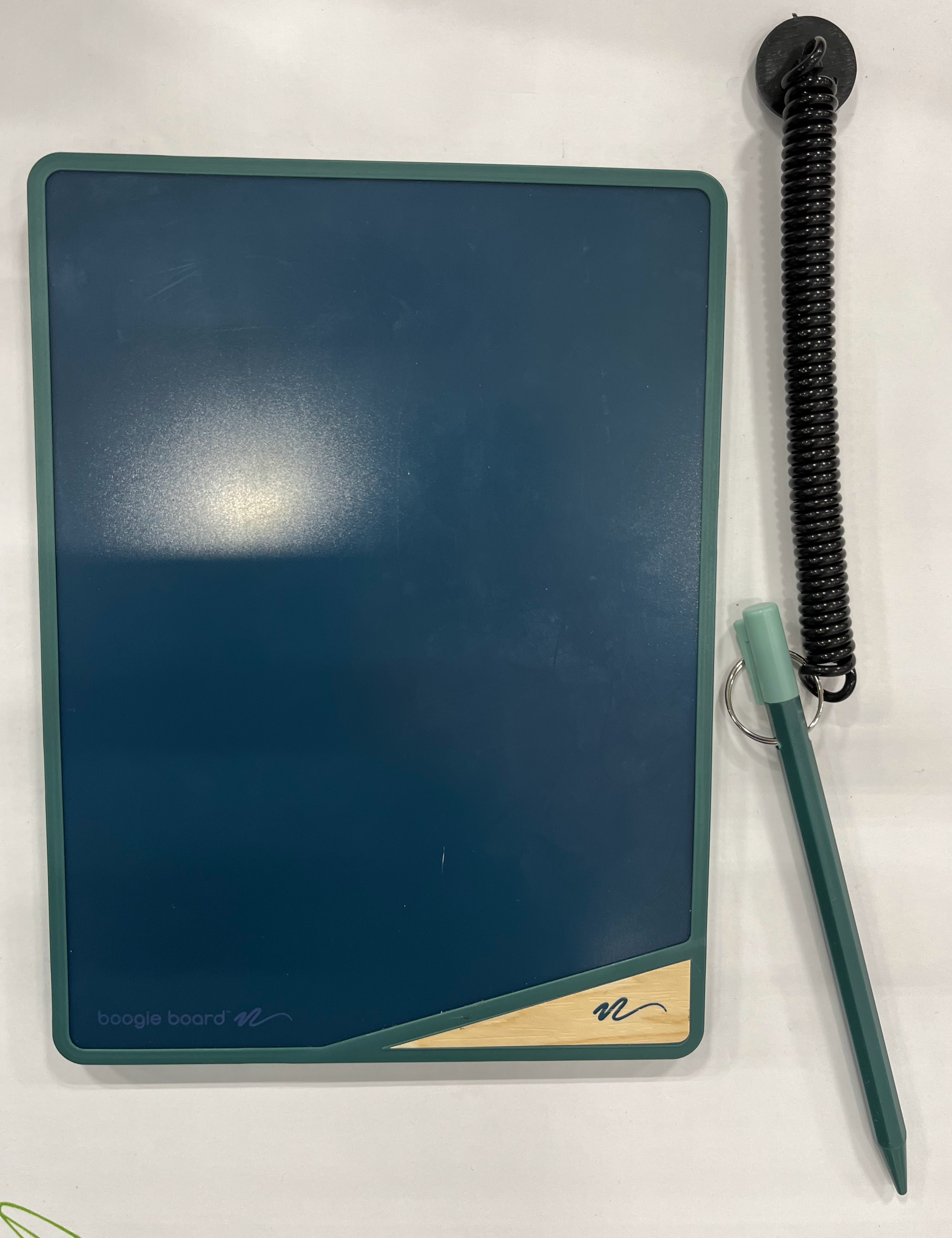
- A Boogie Board Versa Board
- Design firm: Kent Displays Incorporated
- Type: eWriter tablet

Boogie Board is a product line of paperless notetaking tools, utilizing an LCD in conjunction with a stylus, finger, or other implement to replicate the functionality of pen and paper.

The Boogie Board was developed by Kent Displays Incorporated, based on research conducted at Kent State University.

== Technology ==
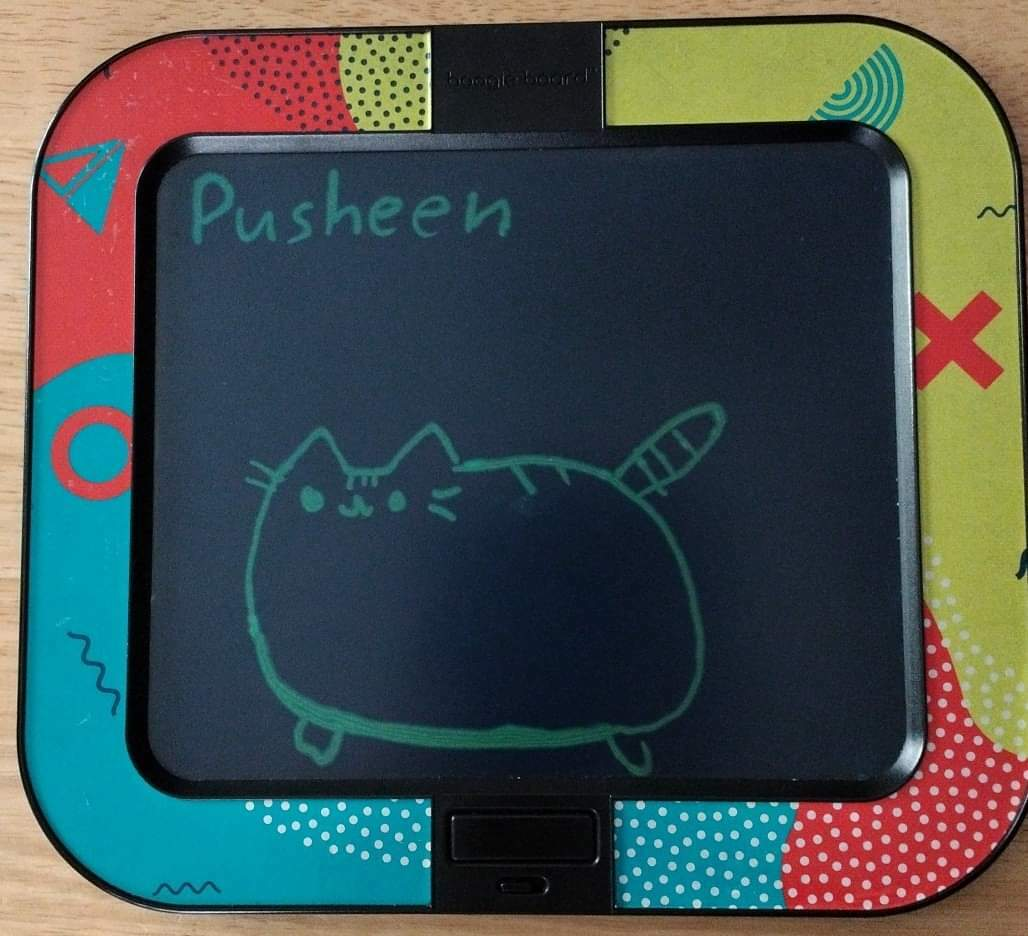
A Boogie Board Dash toy model after a user has drawn Pusheen.

Boogie board is based on reflex display technology; i.e. LCDs that use cholesteric liquid crystal technology to reflect light in one state, and to be dark (non-reflecting) in the other state. The dark state occurs when a flash of voltage re-orients the molecules to a non-reflective state.

Responsiveness has been compared to that of writing on paper. Drawings can be hard to see without illumination.

Battery lifespan is estimated at 50,000 erasures.

=== Digitization ===
Some higher end models add a digitization panel, allowing the user's input to be saved as a PDF. The board itself does not allow direct review of stored pages.

On models lacking internal digitization, capture can be achieved through a smartphone camera using a Mobile app, though quality through this method is low.

== Marketing ==
Boogie Boards are marketed as having uses like writing, drawing, and taking notes. Some models are designed to replicate the form factor of specific notetaking devices, such as the sticky note.

One model was released exclusively in Brookstone stores.
