= Dexerials =

Japanese company

Dexerials Corporation
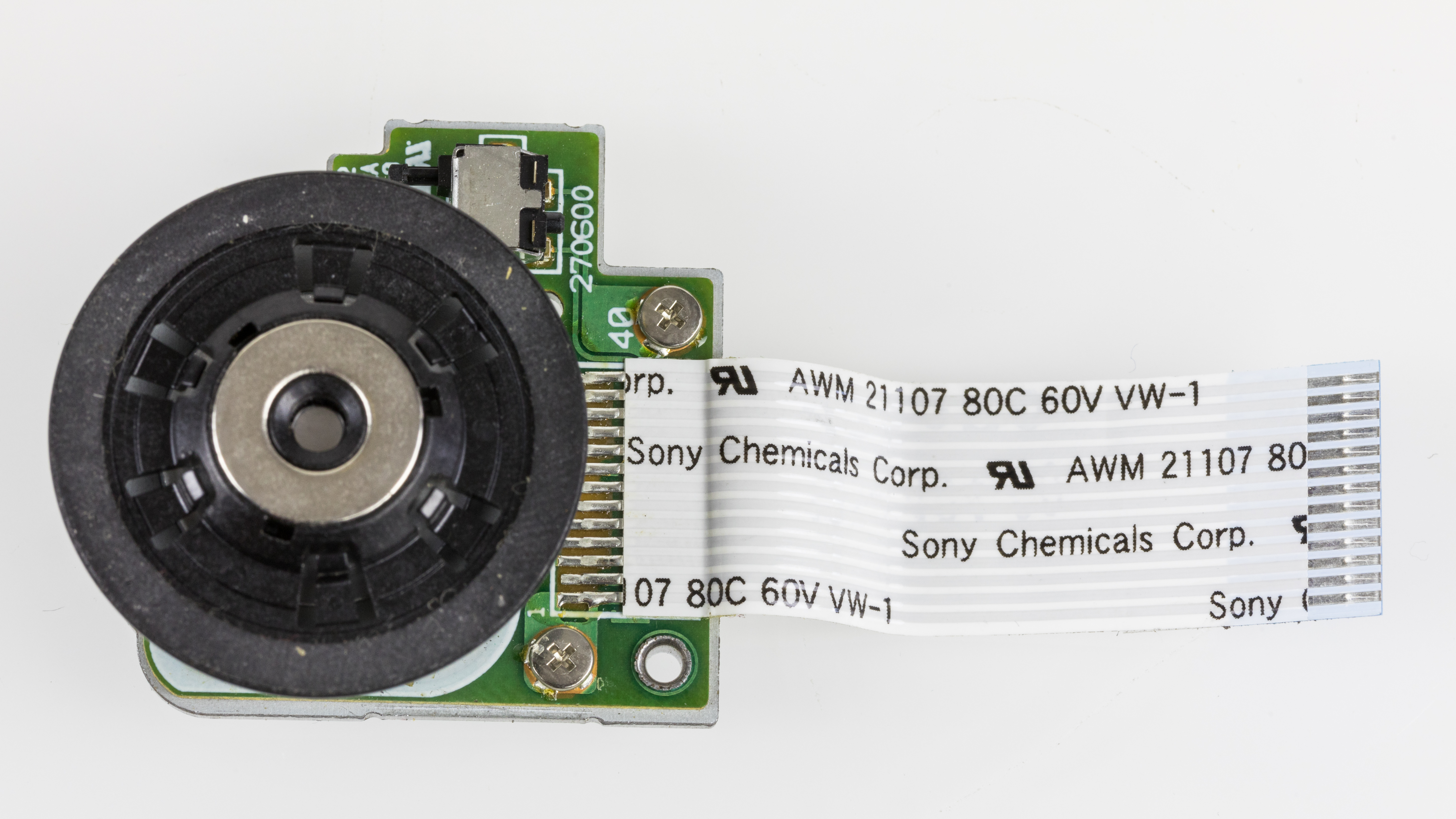
- Flexible flat cable made by Sony Chemicals
- Native name

Japanese name
- Kanji: ソニーケミカル株式会社
Transcriptions
- Revised Hepburn: Sonī Kemikaru Kabushiki-gaisha
- Industry: Electronics
- Founded: 1962; 64 years ago
- Headquarters: Tokyo, Japan
- Parent: Sony Corporation (until 2012)
- Subsidiaries: Sony Chemicals Corporation of America
- Website: www.dexerials.jp

Sony Chemicals Corporation (ソニーケミカル株式会社, Sonī Kemikaru Kabushiki-gaisha) was a Japanese company established 1962, and was a wholly owned subsidiary of Sony Corporation. In 2008, Sony Chemical & Information Device transferred its thermal transfer ink ribbon business to Dai Nippon Printing. In 2012, Sony Chemicals Corporation was separated from Sony Group and renamed Dexerials Corporation. As of 2024, The Master Trust Bank of Japan, Ltd. is the largest shareholder of the corporation.

== Holdings ==
- Sony Chemicals Corporation of America (100%)

== Categories of product ==
- Electronic materials and parts
- Joining materials
- Others
