= Dynamic scattering mode =

George Heilmeier proposed the dynamic scattering effect which causes a strong scattering of light when the electric field applied to a special liquid crystal mixture exceeds a threshold value.

A DSM cell requires the following ingredients:

- a liquid crystal with negative dielectric anisotropy (aligns the LC long axis perpendicular to the electric field),
- homeotropic alignment of the LC (i.e. perpendicular to the substrate planes),
- doping of the LC with a substance that increases the conductivity of the LC to allow a current to flow.

With no voltage applied the LC-cell with the homeotropically aligned LC is clear and transparent. With increasing voltage and current, the electric field tries to align the long molecular axis of the LC perpendicular to the field while the ion transport through the layer has the tendency to align the LC perpendicular to the substrate plates. As a result, a pattern of repetitive striped regions called Williams domains is generated in the cell. Increasing the voltage further causes this regular pattern to be replaced by a turbulent state which strongly scatters light. This effect belongs to the class of electro-hydrodynamic effects in LCs. Electro-optic displays can be realized with the effect in the transmissive and reflective mode of operation. The driving voltages required for light scattering are in the range of several tens of volts, and the non-trivial current depends on the area of the activated segments. Historically the DSM effect was thus poorly suited for displays in battery-powered devices.
