= Twisted nematic field effect =

Type of liquid-crystal display technology

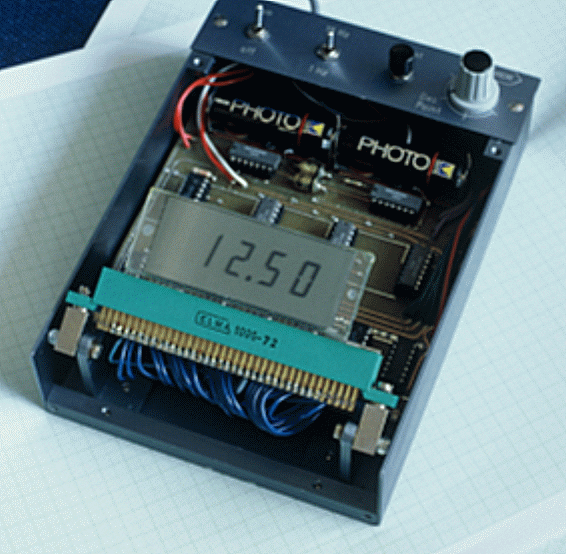
Clock with an early LCD prototype based on the twisted nematic field effect

The twisted nematic effect (TN effect) was a major technological breakthrough that made the manufacture of large, thin liquid crystal displays practical and cost competitive. Unlike earlier flat-panel displays, TN cells did not require a current to flow for operation and used low operating voltages suitable for use with batteries. The introduction of TN effect displays led to their rapid expansion in the display field, quickly pushing out other common technologies like monolithic LEDs and CRTs for most electronics. By the 1990s, TN-effect LCDs were largely universal in portable electronics, although since then, many applications of LCDs adopted alternatives to the TN effect such as in-plane switching (IPS) or vertical alignment (VA).

Many monochrome alphanumerical displays without picture information still use TN LCDs.

TN displays benefit from fast response times and less smearing than other liquid crystal display technologies, but suffer from poor color reproduction and limited viewing angles, especially in the vertical direction. Colors will shift, potentially to the point of completely inverting, when viewed at an angle that is not perpendicular to the display. Viewing the display from above whitens colors, and viewing the display from below dims colors.

== Description ==
The twisted nematic effect is based on the precisely controlled realignment of liquid crystal molecules between different ordered molecular configurations under the action of an applied electric field. This is achieved with little power consumption and at low operating voltages. The underlying phenomenon of alignment of liquid crystal molecules in applied field is called Fréedericksz transition and was discovered by Russian physicist Vsevolod Frederiks in 1927.

To display information with a twisted nematic liquid crystal, transparent electrodes are structured by photolithography to form a matrix or other pattern of electrodes, such as the seven-segment display used in low-information content applications like watches or calculators. Only one of the electrodes has to be patterned in this way, the other can remain continuous (common electrode). If more complex data or graphics information have to be displayed, a matrix arrangement of electrodes is used. Because of this, voltage-controlled addressing of dot-matrix displays, such as in LCD screens for computer monitors or flat television screens, is more complex than with segmented electrodes. For a matrix of limited resolution or for a slow-changing display on even a large matrix panel, a passive grid of electrodes is sufficient to implement passive matrix addressing, provided that there are independent electronic drivers for each row and column. A high-resolution matrix LCD with required fast response (e.g. for animated graphics and/or video) necessitates integration of additional non-linear electronic elements into each picture element (pixel) of the display (e.g., thin-film diodes, TFDs, or thin-film transistors, TFTs) in order to allow active matrix addressing of individual picture elements without crosstalk (unintended activation of non-addressed pixels).

The following illustrations show the OFF and ON states of a single pixel (which could instead be a segment of a character) of a twisted nematic light modulator liquid crystal display operating in the "normally white" mode, i.e., a mode in which light is transmitted when no electrical field is applied to the liquid crystal:

=== OFF state (transparent) ===
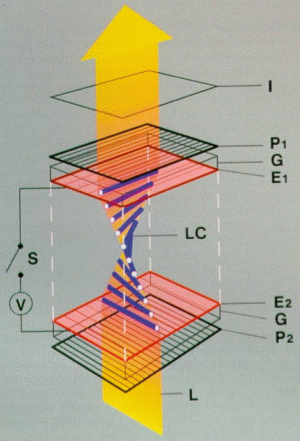
OFF state

In the OFF state, i.e., when no electrical field is applied, the nematic liquid crystal molecules form a twisted configuration (aka helical structure or helix) between the two glass plates, G in the figure, which are separated by several spacers and coated with transparent electrodes, E_{1} and E_{2}. The electrodes themselves are coated with alignment layers (not shown) that precisely twist the liquid crystal by 90° when no external field is present. Incoming light is first polarized by the first polarizer, P_{2}. The helical configuration of the liquid crystal rotates the light's polarization by 90°, so the light will be properly polarized to pass through the second polarizer, P_{1}, set at 90° to the first. Because the light passes through the cell, the pixel, I, appears transparent.

=== ON state (opaque) ===
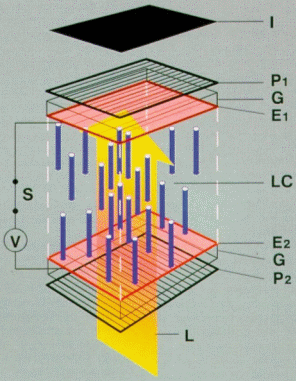
ON state

In the ON state, i.e., when a sufficient electrical field is applied between the two electrodes, the crystal molecules align in the direction of that field. Without the helical configuration of the liquid crystal to reorient the light's polarization angle, polarized light from polarizer P_{2} is instead blocked by polarizer P_{1}, so the pixel, I, appears opaque.

Current is only needed to charge and discharge the capacitance of the corresponding LC cell, which happens only when the applied voltage changes. Current isn't needed to sustain the electric field, because no current (ideally) flows through the liquid crystal layer. Thus, LCDs require very little power.

However, the electric field's direction may need to be periodically reversed during the ON state by using an alternating voltage for "AC operation", because keeping the electric field in only one direction for too long during the ON state (or having a DC component as small as 50 mV in the AC voltage) may cause electrochemical reactions which reduce the cell's life.

=== Semi-transparent ===
The amount of opacity can be controlled by varying the voltage. Below a threshold voltage, which depends on the liquid crystal's mixture, no visual change occurs. At voltages near the threshold, only some crystals will realign, so the cell will be mostly transparent but just barely visible. As the voltage is increased, more crystals will realign until the cell reaches its maximum opacity. Already in 1972, mixtures were developed with a threshold voltage of only 0.9 V rms and which reached 90% of maximum opacity at 1.4 V rms.

== History ==
=== RCA research ===
In 1962, Richard Williams, a physical chemist working at RCA Laboratories, started seeking new physical phenomena that might yield a display technology without vacuum tubes. Aware of the long line of research involving nematic liquid crystals, he started experimenting with the compound p-azoxyanisole which has a melting point of 115 °C (239 °F). Williams set up his experiments on a heated microscope stage, placing samples between transparent tin-oxide electrodes on glass plates held at 125 °C (257 °F). He discovered that a very strong electrical field applied across the stack would cause striped patterns to form. These were later termed "Williams domains". The required field was about 1,000 volts per centimeter, far too high for a practical device. Realizing that development would be lengthy, he turned the research over to physicist George Heilmeier and moved on to other work.

In 1964, RCA's George H. Heilmeier along with Louis Zanoni and chemist Lucian Barton discovered that certain liquid crystals could be switched between a transparent state and a highly scattering opaque one with the application of electric current. The scattering was primarily forward, into the crystal, as opposed to backscattering towards the light source. By placing a reflector on the far side of the crystal, the incident light could be turned on or off electrically, creating what Heilmeier dubbed dynamic scattering. In 1965 Joseph Castellano and Joel Goldmacher, organic chemists, sought crystals that remained in the fluid state at room temperature. Within six months they had found a number of candidates, and with further development, RCA was able to announce the first liquid crystal displays in 1968.

Although successful, the dynamic scattering display required constant current flow through the device, as well as relatively high voltages. This made them unattractive for low-power situations, where many of these sorts of displays were being used. Not being self-lit, LCDs also required external lighting if they were going to be used in low-light situations, which made existing display technologies even more unattractive in overall power terms. A further limitation was the requirement for a mirror, which limited the viewing angles. The RCA team was aware of these limitations, and continued development of a variety of technologies.

One of these potential effects had been discovered by Heilmeier in 1964. He was able to get organic dyes to attach themselves to the liquid crystals, and they would stay in position when pulled into alignment by an external field. When switched from one alignment to the other, the dye was either visible or hidden, resulting in two colored states called the guest-host effect. Work on this approach stopped when the dynamic scattering effect had been demonstrated successfully.

=== TN effect ===
Another potential approach was the twisted-nematic approach, which had first been noticed by French physicist Charles-Victor Mauguin in 1911. Mauguin was experimenting with a variety of semi-solid liquid crystals when he noted that he could align the crystals by pulling a piece of paper across them, causing the crystals to become polarized. He later noticed when he sandwiched the crystal between two aligned polarizers, he could twist them in relation to each other, but the light continued to be transmitted. This was not expected. Normally if two polarizers are aligned at right angles, light will not flow through them. Mauguin concluded that the light was being re-polarized by the twisting of the crystal itself.

Wolfgang Helfrich, a physicist who joined RCA in 1967, became interested in Mauguin's twisted structure and thought it might be used to create an electronic display. However RCA showed little interest because they felt that any effect that used two polarizers would also have a large amount of light absorption, requiring it to be brightly lit. In 1970, Helfrich left RCA and joined the Central Research Laboratories of Hoffmann-LaRoche in Switzerland, where he teamed up with Martin Schadt, a solid-state physicist. Schadt built a sample with electrodes and a twisted version of a liquid-crystal material called PEBAB (p-ethoxybenzylidene-p'-aminobenzonitrile), which Helfrich had reported in prior studies at RCA, as part of their guest-host experiments. When voltage is applied, PEBAB aligns itself along the field, breaking the twisting structure and the redirection of the polarization, making the cell turn opaque.

=== Patent battle ===
At this time Brown, Boveri & Cie (BBC) was also working with the devices as part of a prior joint medical research agreement with Hoffmann-LaRoche. BBC demonstrated their work to a physicist from the US who was associated with James Fergason, an expert in liquid crystals at the Westinghouse Research Laboratories. Fergason was working on the TN effect for displays, having formed ILIXCO to commercialize developments of the research being carried out in conjunction with Sardari Arora and Alfred Saupe at Kent State University's Liquid Crystal Institute.

When news of the demonstration reached Hoffmann-LaRoche, Helfrich and Schadt immediately pushed for a patent, which was filed on 4 December 1970. Their formal results were published in Applied Physics Letters on 15 February 1971. To demonstrate the feasibility of the new effect for displays, Schadt fabricated a 4-digit display panel in 1972.

Fergason published a similar patent in the US on either 9 February 1971 or 22 April 1971. This was two months after the Swiss patent was filed and set the stage for a three-year legal confrontation that was settled out of court. In the end, all the parties received a share of what would become many millions of dollars in royalties.

=== Commercial development of liquid crystal materials ===
PEBAB was subject to breakdown when exposed to water or alkalines, and required special manufacturing to avoid contamination. In 1972 a team led by George W. Gray developed a new type of cyanobiphenyls that could be mixed with PEBAB to produce less reactive materials. These additives also made the resulting liquid less viscous, thereby providing faster response times, while at the same time making them more transparent, which produced a pure-white color display.

This work, in turn, led to the discovery of an entirely different class of nematic crystals by Ludwig Pohl, Rudolf Eidenschink and their colleagues at Merck KGaA in Darmstadt, called cyanophenylcyclohexanes. They quickly became the basis of almost all LCDs, and remain a major part of Merck's business today.

== See also ==
- History of display technology
- Segmented liquid-crystal display
