= Antal Jákli =

Hungarian-American physicist (born 1958)

Antal István Jákli
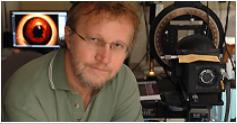
- Born: 3 October 1958 (age 68); Szombathely, Hungary
- Education: Eötvös Loránd University, Hungarian Academy of Sciences
- Known for: Bent-core liquid crystals; Flexoelectricity; Piezoelectricity; Ferroelectricity
- Awards: Alfred Saupe Prize (2020); Luckhurst-Samulski Prize (2010)
- Scientific career
- Fields: Physics
- Workplaces: Kent State University
- Doctoral advisor: Ágnes Buka

Antal I. "Tony" Jákli (born 3 October 1958) is a Hungarian-American physicist and professor of physics and materials science at Kent State University. He is known for his work with bent-core, flexoelectric, and ferroelectric liquid crystals.

== Education and career ==
Jákli received a Master of Science in 1983 and a Ph.D. in 1986 in Physics from Eötvös Loránd University in Budapest, Hungary. After postdoctoral fellowships with Alfred Saupe at Kent State University (1989–1992) and at the Max Planck Institute in Halle, Germany (1993–1995), he served as a research fellow at the Research Institute for Solid State Physics in Budapest. He was awarded a D.Sc. from the Hungarian Academy of Sciences in 2000.

In 1999, Jákli joined the Liquid Crystal Institute (now the Advanced Materials and Liquid Crystal Institute) at Kent State University as a research fellow. He was appointed assistant professor in 2004, received tenure in 2007, and was promoted to full professor in 2012.

== Research ==
Jákli's research focuses on the physical, electro-optical, and electromechanical properties of liquid crystals, particularly molecular systems with reduced symmetry. His work has significantly advanced the understanding of bent-core (or "banana-shaped") molecules, which exhibit polar and chiral phases that are absent in traditional rod-shaped liquid crystals. He is particularly recognized for his contributions to the study of "banana mania" in nematic phases and the characterization of the twist-bend nematic phase.

His research also encompasses flexoelectricity—the coupling between polarization and strain—where he demonstrated "giant" flexoelectric effects in bent-core systems. Since the emergence of the field in 2020, Jákli's research has extensively focused on ferroelectric nematic liquid crystals. In 2024, his team reported the first demonstration of converse piezoelectricity in three-dimensional fluids using these materials, a discovery termed "liquid piezoelectricity" with potential applications in soft robotics and sensors.

Additionally, he has developed responsive materials including ionic liquid crystal elastomers (iLCEs) and electrospun fibers for use in soft actuators. His interdisciplinary work also extends to biotechnology, where he has utilized thermotropic liquid crystal films as label-free biosensors for the detection of antigens and enzymatic activity.

== Selected publications ==
- Jákli, A.; Lavrentovich, O. D.; Selinger, J. V. (2018). "Physics of liquid crystals of bent-shaped molecules". Reviews of Modern Physics. 90 (4) 045004. doi:10.1103/RevModPhys.90.045004.
- Jákli, A.; Saupe, A. (2006). One- and Two-Dimensional Fluids: Properties of Smectic, Lamellar and Columnar Liquid Crystals. CRC Press. doi:10.1201/9781420012200. ISBN 978-0-7503-0969-1.
- Popov, P.; Mann, E. K.; Jákli, A. (2017). "Thermotropic liquid crystal films for biosensors and beyond". Journal of Materials Chemistry B. 5 (26): 5061–5078. doi:10.1039/C7TB00809K.
- Borshch, V.; Kim, Y.K.; Xiang, J.; Gao, M.; Jákli, A. (2013). "Nematic twist-bend phase with nanoscale modulation of molecular orientation". Nature Communications. 4 (2635): 1–8. arXiv:1309.1452. doi:10.1038/ncomms3635. PMID 24189583.
- Harden, J.; Mbanga, B.; Éber, N.; Fodor-Csorba, K.; Sprunt, S.; Gleeson, J. T.; Jákli, A. (2006). "Giant Flexoelectricity of Bent-Core Nematic Liquid Crystals". Physical Review Letters. 97 (15) 157802. doi:10.1103/PhysRevLett.97.157802.

== Awards ==
- Alfred Saupe Prize (2020), awarded by the German Liquid Crystal Society.
- Luckhurst-Samulski Prize (2010), for the paper "Electro-mechanical effects in liquid crystals" published in the journal Liquid Crystals.
- Outstanding Research Scholar of Kent State University (2012)
- Bólyai Young Researchers Scholar (1998–1999), Hungarian Academy of Sciences
