= Yuriy Reznikov =

Ukrainian physicist

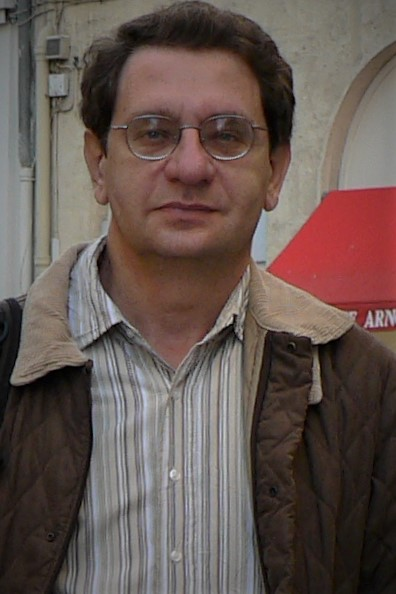
- Born: October 16, 1953
- Died: October 8, 2016 (aged 62)
- Education: Taras Shevchenko National University of Kyiv
- Organization: NASU Institute of Physics
- Known for: Liquid Crystals; Photoalignment; Nanoparticles; Nonlinear Optics

Yuriy Reznikov (16 October 1953 – 8 October 2016) was a Ukrainian physicist, Head of the Department of Crystals at NASU Institute of Physics and a world-renown expert in the field of liquid crystals. He is known for his work on photoalignment, "giant" optical non-linearity of liquid crystals and nano-colloids.

== Education and career ==
Yuriy Reznikov received his Master's degree in radiophysics from Taras Shevchenko National University of Kyiv in 1976. In 1985, he received his doctorate in physics in NASU Institute of Physics. His Ph.D. thesis was titled “The study of the optical nonlinearity of liquid crystals near their electron absorption bands”. In 1995, Yuriy has received his Doctor of Sciences degree after defending the thesis titled “Light Induced Impurities in Liquid Crystals”. Since 1995, he was a head of the Department of Crystals in NASU Institute of Physics.

== Research ==
During 1979-1984 Yuriy Reznikov has discovered and studied “Giant” optical nonlinearity of liquid crystals caused by photo-transformation of their molecules (so called “conformational nonlinearity”). Prof. Francesco Simoni of Polytechnic University of the Marches (Ancona, Italy) wrote in his condolence for the death of Yuriy: “This nonlinearity is considered as a milestone for researches that followed and had many consequences as the ones related to effects of photo-isomerization on the liquid crystalline state carried out by several groups over the world and leading to the exciting research of photomobile materials”. The conformational nonlinearity then was applied for optical information processing and hologram recording.

After finishing the PhD thesis Yuriy has developed a method to measure the liquid crystal anchoring energy using light scattering technique. In the 1985-89 he has also studied the effect of a light-induced change of a cholesteric pitch under molecular photo-transformations.

Later on in 1989-1995 Yuriy’s significant accomplishments include the development of the photoalignment technology and control of the liquid crystal anchoring parameters by photoalignment technique. His groundbreaking work has paved the way for the development of this technology all the way to the widespread use in the LCD manufacturing since 2010. Other Yuriy's achievements in this time frame include conformational optical nonlinearity in two-phase region of liquid crystals, surface-driven reorientation effects in liquid crystal cells with photosensitive aligning layer.

Since 1995, Yuriy’s main milestones include light manipulation of nanoparticles in arrays of topological defects, developing a technique to measure ultra-large cholesteric pitch, studying orientational coupling in two-component suspensions of rod-like nanoparticles, discovering strong thermal optical nonlinearity in liquid crystalline metal nano-colloids, developing stable liquid crystal ferromagnetic nano-colloids, observation of high magnetic sensitivity of the aggregated ferromagnetic nano-colloids, surface mediated photorefraction in liquid crystals, developing rollable bistable plastic liquid crystal displays, studying diluted liquid crystal ferroelectric nano-colloids, finding surface bistability in liquid crystals sandwiched between photo-aligning surfaces.

== Selected publications ==
- Odulov, S. G., Reznikov, Y. A., Soskin, M. S., & Khizhnyak, A. I. (1984). Photostimulated change of phase-transition temperature and “giant” optical nonlinearity of liquid crystals. In Opticals Effects in Liquid Crystals (pp. 224–228). Springer, Dordrecht. doi: 10.1007/978-94-011-3180-3_29
- Vinvogradov, V., A. Khizhnyak, L. Kutulya, Yu Reznikov, and V. Reshetnyak. "Photoinduced change of cholesteric LC-pitch." Molecular crystals and liquid crystals incorporating nonlinear optics 192, no. 1 (1990): 273-278. doi:10.1080/00268949008035640
- Dyadyusha, A. G., Marusii, T. Y., Reshetnyak, V. Y., Reznikov, Y. A., & Khizhnyak, A. I. (1992). Orientational effect due to a change in the anisotropy of the interaction between a liquid crystal and a bounding surface. JETP lett, 56(1), 17-21.
- Voloshchenko, D., Khyzhnyak, A., Reznikov, Y., & Reshetnyak, V. (1995). Control of an easy-axis on nematic-polymer interface by light action to nematic bulk. Japanese journal of applied physics, 34(2R), 566.
- Glushchenko, A., Kresse, H., Reshetnyak, V., Reznikov, Y., & Yaroshchuk, O. (1997). Memory effect in filled nematic liquid crystals. Liquid crystals, 23(2), 241-246. doi:10.1080/026782997208505
- Simoni, F., Francescangeli, O., Reznikov, Y., & Slussarenko, S. (1997). Dye-doped liquid crystals as high-resolution recording media. Optics letters, 22(8), 549-551. doi:10.1364/OL.22.000937
- Francescangeli, O., Slussarenko, S., Simoni, F., Andrienko, D., Reshetnyak, V., & Reznikov, Y. (1999). Light-induced surface sliding of the nematic director in liquid crystals. Physical review letters, 82(9), 1855. doi:10.1103/PhysRevLett.82.1855
- Zhang, J., Ostroverkhov, V., Singer, K. D., Reshetnyak, V., & Reznikov, Y. (2000). Electrically controlled surface diffraction gratings in nematic liquid crystals. Optics letters, 25(6), 414-416. doi:10.1364/ol.25.000414
- Ouskova, E., Yu Reznikov, S. V. Shiyanovskii, L. Su, John L. West, O. V. Kuksenok, O. Francescangeli, and F. Simoni. "Photo-orientation of liquid crystals due to light-induced desorption and adsorption of dye molecules on an aligning surface." Physical Review E 64, no. 5 (2001): 051709. doi:10.1103/physreve.64.051709
- Fedorenko, Denis, Elena Ouskova, Victor Reshetnyak, and Yuriy Reznikov. "Evolution of light-induced anchoring in dye-doped nematics: Experiment and model." Physical Review E 73, no. 3 (2006): 031701. doi:10.1103/PhysRevE.73.031701
- Ouskova, E., Buchnev, O., Reshetnyak, V., Reznikov, Y., & Kresse, H. (2003). Dielectric relaxation spectroscopy of a nematic liquid crystal doped with ferroelectric Sn 2 P 2 S 6 nanoparticles. Liquid Crystals, 30(10), 1235-1239.10.1080/02678290310001601996
- Reznikov, Y., Buchnev, O., Tereshchenko, O., Reshetnyak, V., Glushchenko, A., & West, J. (2003). Ferroelectric nematic suspension. Applied Physics Letters, 82(12), 1917-1919. doi: 10.1063/1.1560871
- Buluy, Oleksandr, et al. "Magnetic sensitivity of a dispersion of aggregated ferromagnetic carbon nanotubes in liquid crystals." Soft Matter 7.2 (2011): 644-649. doi:10.1039/C0SM00131G
- Yaroshchuk, Oleg, and Yuriy Reznikov. "Photoalignment of liquid crystals: basics and current trends." Journal of Materials Chemistry 22.2 (2012): 286-300. doi: 10.1039/C1JM13485J
- Kasyanyuk, D., P. Pagliusi, A. Mazzulla, V. Reshetnyak, Yu Reznikov, C. Provenzano, M. Giocondo, M. Vasnetsov, O. Yaroshchuk, and G. Cipparrone. "Light manipulation of nanoparticles in arrays of topological defects." Scientific reports 6, no. 1 (2016): 1-7. doi:10.1038/srep20742
- Reznikov, Yuriy, Anatoliy Glushchenko, and Yuriy Garbovskiy. "Ferromagnetic and ferroelectric nanoparticles in liquid crystals." Liquid crystals with nano and microparticles. 2017. 657-693. doi:10.1142/9789814619264_0019
- Complete list of publications is available at Google Scholar

== Awards ==
- Freedericksz medal (Liquid Crystal Society "Commonwealth"), 2010
- A. F. Prikhot’ko award (National Academy of Sciences of Ukraine), 2012
