= Landau–de Gennes theory =

In physics, Landau–de Gennes theory describes the NI transition, i.e., phase transition between nematic liquid crystals and isotropic liquids, which is based on the classical Landau's theory and was developed by Pierre-Gilles de Gennes in 1969. The phenomenological theory uses the $\mathbf{Q}$ tensor as an order parameter in expanding the free energy density.

== Mathematical description ==
The NI transition is a first-order phase transition, albeit it is very weak. The order parameter is the $\mathbf{Q}$ tensor, which is symmetric, traceless, second-order tensor and vanishes in the isotropic liquid phase. We shall consider a uniaxial $\mathbf Q$ tensor, which is defined by

$$\mathbf Q = S(\mathbf n\otimes\mathbf n - \tfrac{1}{3}\mathbf I)$$

where $S=S(T)$ is the scalar order parameter and $\mathbf n$ is the director. The $\mathbf Q$ tensor is zero in the isotropic liquid phase since the scalar order parameter $S$ is zero, but becomes non-zero in the nematic phase.

Near the NI transition, the (Helmholtz or Gibbs) free energy density $\mathcal{F}$ is expanded about as

$$\mathcal{F} = \mathcal{F}_0 + \frac{A}{2} Q_{ij}Q_{ji} - \frac{B}{3} Q_{ij}Q_{jk}Q_{ki} + \frac{C}{4} (Q_{ij}Q_{ij})^2$$

or more compactly

$$\mathcal{F} = \mathcal{F}_0 + \frac{A}{2}\mathrm{tr} \,\mathbf{Q}^2 -  \frac{B}{3}\mathrm{tr} \,\mathbf{Q}^3 + \frac{C}{4}(\mathrm{tr} \,\mathbf{Q}^2)^2$$

where $(A,B,C)$ are functions of temperature. Near the phase transition, we can expand $A(T)=a (T-T_*)+\cdots$, $B(T) = b + \cdots$ and $C(T)=c + \cdots$ with $(a,b,c)$ being three positive constants. Now substituting the $\mathbf Q$ tensor results in

$$\mathcal{F} - \mathcal{F}_0 = \frac{a}{3}(T-T_*)S^2  - \frac{2b}{27} S^3 + \frac{c}{9}S^4.$$

This is minimized when

$$3a(T-T_*) S - b S^2 + 2c S^3=0.$$

The two required solutions of this equation are

$$\begin{align}\text{Isotropic:} & \,\,S_I = 0,\\
\text{Nematic:} & \,\,S_N = \frac{b}{4c} \left[1+\sqrt{1-\frac{24ac}{b^2}(T-T_*)}\,\right]>0.
\end{align}$$

The NI transition temperature $T_{NI}$ is not simply equal to $T_*$ (which would be the case in second-order phase transition), but is given by

$$T_{NI} = T_* + \frac{b^2}{27ac}, \quad S_{NI} = \frac{b}{3c}$$

$S_{NI}$ is the scalar order parameter at the transition.
