= Alignment layer =

Component of LCDs

Alignment layers, or alignment films, are thin films which are a crucial component of liquid crystal displays (LCDs). They are applied to the surfaces of the glass substrates that contain the liquid crystals. The primary function of these layers is to control the orientation of the liquid crystal molecules, which is essential for the proper operation of the display. The alignment layer controls the alignment of the liquid crystal immediately adjacent to itself, and long-range interactions force that alignment to extend significantly into the crystal itself.

Alignment layers ensure that liquid crystal molecules are aligned in a specific direction when no electric field is applied. This is critical for the display's function; for example, in twisted nematic (TN) displays, the alignment layers on the two glass substrates are oriented at right angles to each other, creating a 90-degree twist in the liquid crystal molecules, allowing display to modulate light effectively when an electric field is applied. By applying a voltage across the liquid crystal layer, however, the orientation of the molecules can be altered, affecting the passage of light through the display, and enabling the control of brightness and contrast.

As of 2025, the two main techniques used to produce alignment layers are rubbing and photo-alignment. The rubbing method is a process that is nearly 100 years old—by rubbing spin-coated polymers with velvet cloth. As this process presents difficulties when used to make larger displays, other options have been investigated. The rubbing method can result in static electricity issues, dust deposition, and scratches.

== Techniques ==
Traditionally, liquid crystals are aligned by rubbing electrodes on polymer covered glass substrates. Rubbing techniques are widely used in mass production of liquid crystal displays and small laboratories as well. Due to the mechanical contact during rubbing, often debris are formed resulting in impurities and damaged products. Also, static charge is generated by rubbing which can damage sensitive and increasingly miniature electronics in displays.

Photoalignment is a technique for orienting liquid crystals to desired alignments by exposure to polarized light and a photo-reactive alignment chemical. It is usually performed by exposing the alignment chemical ('command surface') to polarized light with desired orientation which then aligns the liquid crystal cells or domains to the exposed orientation. The advantages of photoalignment technique over conventional methods are non-contact high quality alignment, reversible alignment and micro-patterning of liquid crystal phases.

=== Advantages of photoalignment ===
Many of the problems of rubbing can be addressed by photoalignment:

- Photoalignment is by definition a non-contact process. This allows alignment of liquid crystals even in mechanically inaccessible areas. This has immense implications in use of liquid crystals in telecommunications and organic electronics.
- By optical imaging, very small domains can be aligned which results in extremely high quality alignments.
- By varying the orientation of liquid crystal alignment on a microscopic scale, thin film optical devices can be created like lens, polarizer, optical vortex generator, etc.

== History ==
The first technique used to produce an alignment layer on LCD devices was simply rubbing the surface of the glass with paper or leather. The practice of adding a rubbed polymer layer to the glass was adopted later, for increased reliability. Large, expensive machines were then invented to precisely rub the substrate.

=== Photoalignment ===
Photoalignment was first demonstrated in 1988 by K. Ichimura on Quartz substrates with an azobenzene compound acting as the command surface. Shortly after publication of Ichimura's results, the groups from the USA (Gibbons et al.), Russia/Switzerland (Schadt et al. and Ukraine (Dyadyusha et al.) almost simultaneously demonstrated LC photoalignment in an azimuthal plane of the aligning substrate. The latter results have been particularly important because they provided a real alternative to the rubbing technology. Since then several chemical combinations have been demonstrated for photoalignment and applied in production of liquid crystal devices like modern displays.
