= MBBA (disambiguation) =

MBBA may refer to:

- N-(4-Methoxybenzylidene)-4-butylaniline, an organic compound
- State of New York Municipal Bond Bank Agency, a New York State public-benefit corporation
- Metropolitan Black Bar Association, association of African-American attorneys
