= Alfred Saupe =

Dr. Alfred Saupe
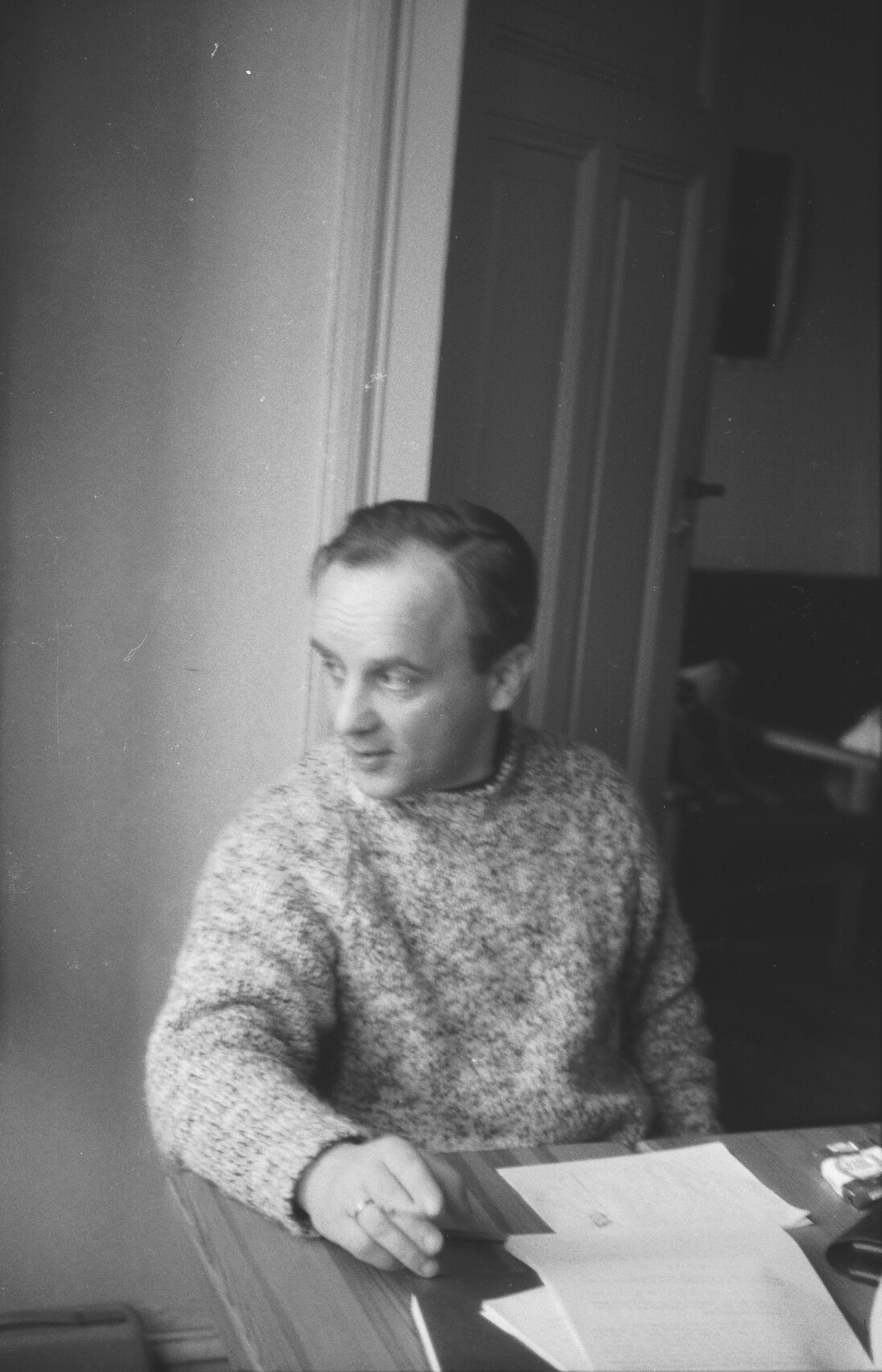
- Born: February 14, 1925; Badenweiler, Germany
- Died: August 3, 2008 (aged 83); Badenweiler, Germany
- Education: Albert Ludwigs University
- Known for: Maier–Saupe theory Biaxial nematic crystal Residual dipolar coupling
- Awards: Nernst Prize 1974; Humboldt Prize 1987; Freederiksz Medal 1999
- Scientific career
- Fields: Physics
- Workplaces: Liquid Crystal Institute; Kent State University
- Doctoral advisor: Dr. Wilhelm Maier

Alfred Saupe (February 14, 1925 – August 3, 2008) was a German Physicist born in Badenweiler, who laid groundbreaking work in the area of liquid crystal studies.

== Biography ==
Saupe, son of a hotelier, attended elementary school in Badenweiler and high school in the neighboring town of Müllheim. In 1943, during his senior year, he was drafted into the army during World War II; later, he served in the Luftwaffe, and finally trained as a paratrooper. In January 1945, he was captured in the Netherlands and became a POW in England. After he was freed in 1948, he completed his high school education in 1949 at the Freiburg Berthold-Gymnasium and began his study of Physics at the Albert-Ludwigs-University in Freiburg.

== Career ==
He received his PhD for his work with the Dr. Wilhelm Maier's liquid crystal group. During that time he completed his ground breaking work on the nematic-isotropic phase transition (Maier-Saupe Theory) . After his promotion in 1958 he stayed on at the University's Physics Institute and began his work with UV spectroscopic studies on liquid crystals and the method to verify the Frank Elastic constants. In 1961, he transferred to the "Freiburger Institut für Elektrowerkstoffe" and became Maier's research assistant. During this time Saupe began performing NMR studies of liquid crystals. He played a lead role in first discovery of NMR spectroscopy in partially oriented media in 1963, and in a very fundamental paper he was also able to present the essential theory to describe and understand the observable phenomena only one year later. In 1965, after the unexpected death of his mentor Maier, he transferred to the group of Hans-Joachim Cantow at the "Freiburger Institut für Makromolekulare Chemie", which, at the time, had one of the world's only superconducting NMR spectrometers.

In 1968, Saupe worked as a visiting professor at the Liquid Crystal Institute at Kent State University, and the following year he became a tenured professor of Physics at Kent State. There he continued his NMR studies, concentrating on the chiral smectic phases and the elastic characteristics of nematic liquid crystals. Saupe retired from Kent State University in 1992 and became the director of the "Max-Planck-Arbeitsgruppe Flüssigkristalline Systeme" at the University of Halle, Germany. He spent his final years, when he was ill of Parkinsons, back in his home town of Badenweiler.

For his work he received the Nernst Prize in 1974, the Humboldt Prize in 1987, the Kent State Presidents Medal in 1992, and the Freederiksz Medal in 1999. He also became one of the first honored members of the International Liquid Crystal Society in 1998. In commemoration of Saupe, the German Liquid Crystal Society began awarding the Alfred Saupe prize to outstanding individuals from all areas of research and technology involving liquid crystals and mesophases.

== Prizes ==
- Nerst-Haber-Bodenstein-Preis of the German Bunsengesellschaft (1974)
- Humboldt Prize (1987)
- Guest at the Max Planck Institute for Polymer Research in Mainz (1987)
- Kent State President's Medal (1992)
- Invitation to the Wissensshaftkolleg in Berlin (1998)
- Honored member of the International Liquid Crystal Society (1998)
- Freedericksz Medal of the Russian Liquid Crystal Society (1999)

== Publications ==
Patricia E. Cladis, Peter Pálffy-Muhoray: Dynamics and Defects in Liquid Crystals: A Festschrift in Honor of Alfred Saupe, CRC Press, 1998
A. Jákli, A. Saupe: One- and Two-dimensional Fluids: Properties of Smectic, Lamellar and Columnar Liquid Crystals, CRC Press, 2006
