= C18H21NO =

The molecular formula C_{18}H_{21}NO (molar mass: 267.36 g/mol, exact mass: 267.1623 u) may refer to:

- Azacyclonol
- MBBA (N-(4-Methoxybenzylidene)-4-butylaniline)
- Pipradrol
