= Spin coating =

Industrial procedure

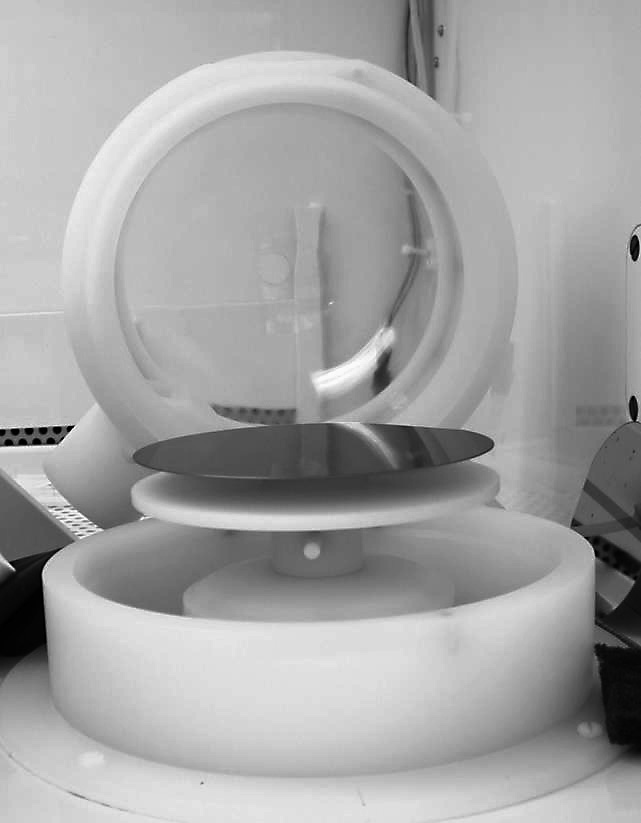
Laurell Technologies WS-400 spin coater used to apply photoresist to the surface of a silicon wafer.

Spin coating is a procedure used to deposit uniform thin films onto flat substrates. Usually a small amount of coating material in liquid form is applied on the center of the substrate, which is either spinning at low speed or not spinning at all. The substrate is then rotated at speeds up to 10,000 rpm to spread the coating material by centrifugal force. A machine used for spin coating is called a spin coater, or simply spinner.

Rotation is continued while the fluid spins off the edges of the substrate, until the desired thickness of the film is achieved. The applied solvent is usually volatile, and simultaneously evaporates. The higher the angular speed of spinning, the thinner the film. The thickness of the film also depends on the viscosity and concentration of the solution, and the solvent. Pioneering theoretical analysis of spin coating was undertaken by Emslie et al., and has been extended by many subsequent authors (including Wilson et al., who studied the rate of spreading in spin coating; and Danglad-Flores et al., who found a universal description to predict the deposited film thickness).

Spin coating is widely used in microfabrication of functional oxide layers on glass or single crystal substrates using sol-gel precursors, where it can be used to create uniform thin films with nanoscale thicknesses. It is used intensively in photolithography, to deposit layers of photoresist about 1 micrometre thick. Photoresist is typically spun at 20 to 80 revolutions per second for 30 to 60 seconds. It is also widely used for the fabrication of planar photonic structures made of polymers. Spin coating is also sometimes used in the preparation of alignment films for LCD displays.

One advantage to spin coating thin films is the uniformity of the film thickness. Owing to self-leveling, thicknesses do not vary more than 1%. The thickness of films produced in this manner may also affect the optical properties of such materials. This is important for electrochemical testing, specifically when recording absorbance readings from ultraviolet-visible spectroscopy, since thicker films have lower optical transmittance. Additionally, films with lower absorbance quality are not as ideal of candidates for processes such as cyclic voltammetry because the low absorbance hinders electrochemical tuning of cations when in an electrochemical cell. Thinner films in this regard have more desirable optical properties that can be tuned for energy storage technologies because of their spin coated influenced properties. However, spin coating thicker films of polymers and photoresists can result in relatively large edge beads whose planarization has physical limits.
