= Ludwig Pohl =

German chemist (1932–2020)

Ludwig Maria Pohl (28 September 1932 – 24 October 2020) was an organic chemist, who was instrumental in developing new liquid crystal substance classes and compounds which made liquid crystal displays (LCDs) widely used. His team at Merck KGaA, Darmstadt, developed liquid crystal mixtures optimized for various applications. Over years, the Merck Group became a leading supplier of liquid crystal compounds worldwide.

== Education and career ==
Pohl was born and raised in Liebau, Lower Silesia. After World War II, his family moved out of Poland to Northern Germany. Starting in 1954, he studied chemistry at the Technische Universität Hannover and at the University of Würzburg. In 1962, he obtained his PhD in physical chemistry at the University of Hanover. The following two years, he acted as assistant at this university. Then, he moved to Würzburg again and worked there as postdoc until 1966. That year, he accepted a research position at Merck KGaA in Darmstadt, where he worked on the analysis of the structure of pharmaceutical drugs.

== Liquid crystals ==
On a trip to the United States in 1968, Pohl became aware of the potential of liquid crystals for display applications, which were still largely unknown at the time. Initially, liquid crystals were not considered to be a business opportunity for the Merck Group. Pohl and his colleagues repeatedly had to overcome internal resistance. They sought outside financing for their research, which was granted by German federal agencies. The resilience of Pohl paid off after years of efforts to find better-suited liquid crystals when he, Rudolf Eidenschink and colleagues successfully synthesized and tested the new class of cyanophenylcyclohexanes based on 4-pentylphenol. Together with other developments in this field, this enable a profitable industrial production and the Merck Group became the leading supplier of liquid crystal substances for various types of LCDs.

Later, the Merck Group bought patents from former competitors and attracted senior professionals such as in 1990 George William Gray to work with Pohl's team.

== Honors ==
- 2014: Ludwig Pohl was inducted into the Hall of Fame of German Research honoring him for his unwavering scientific curiosity and recognizing him with a special distinction for his life's work. He received this honor together with Stefan Hell, who a few weeks later received the Nobel Prize for Chemistry in 2014.

== Publications ==
- Ludwig Pohl: Publications after 2006. researchgate.net. Retrieved 12 July 2022.
- Ludwig Pohl, D. Demus, G. Pelzl, Heino Finkelmann, Karl Hiltrop: Liquid Crystals. (englisch), Stegemeyer Steinkopff, 2012, ISBN 3662083957

== Patents ==
- Pohl was named as inventor or co-inventor of over 100 patents.

== Private life ==
Pohl was married to Hannelore Pohl, had two daughters and a son who is professor at Stanford University.
