= Q-tensor =

Orientational order parameter

In physics, $\mathbf Q$-tensor is an orientational order parameter that describes uniaxial and biaxial nematic liquid crystals and vanishes in the isotropic liquid phase. The $\mathbf Q$ tensor is a second-order, traceless, symmetric tensor and is defined by

$$\mathbf{Q} = S\left(\mathbf n\otimes\mathbf n - \tfrac{1}{3}\mathbf I\right) + R\left(\mathbf m\otimes\mathbf m - \tfrac{1}{3}\mathbf I\right)$$

where $S=S(T)$ and $R=R(T)$ are scalar order parameters, $(\mathbf n,\mathbf m)$ are the two directors of the nematic phase and $T$ is the temperature; in uniaxial liquid crystals, $R=0$. The components of the tensor are

$$Q_{ij} = S\left(n_in_j - \tfrac{1}{3}\delta_{ij}\right)  + R\left(m_im_j - \tfrac{1}{3}\delta_{ij}\right)$$

The states with directors $\mathbf n$ and $-\mathbf n$ are physically equivalent and similarly the states with directors $\mathbf m$ and $-\mathbf m$ are physically equivalent.

The $\mathbf Q$-tensor can always be diagonalized,

$$\mathbf Q=
\frac{1}{3}\begin{bmatrix}
2S-R & 0 &0 \\
0 & 2R-S & 0 \\
0 & 0& -S-R\\
\end{bmatrix}$$

The following are the two invariants of the $\mathbf Q$ tensor,

$$\mathrm{tr}\, \mathbf Q^2= Q_{ij}Q_{ji} = \frac{2}{3}(S^2-SR+R^2), \quad \mathrm{tr}\,\mathbf Q^3 = Q_{ij}Q_{jk}Q_{ki} = \frac{1}{9}[2(S^3+R^3)-3SR(S+R)];$$

the first-order invariant $\mathrm{tr}\,\mathbf Q=Q_{ii}=0$ is trivial here. It can be shown that $(\mathrm{tr}\, \mathbf Q^2)^3\geq 6(\mathrm{tr}\, \mathbf Q^3)^2.$ The measure of biaxiality of the liquid crystal is commonly measured through the parameter

$$\beta = 1 - 6\frac{(\mathrm{tr}\, \mathbf Q^3)^2}{(\mathrm{tr}\, \mathbf Q^2)^3}= \frac{27 S^2 R^2 (S-R)^2}{4(S^2-SR+R^2)^3}.$$

== Uniaxial nematics ==
In uniaxial nematic liquid crystals, $R=0$ and therefore the $\mathbf Q$-tensor reduces to

$$\mathbf{Q} = S\left(\mathbf n\mathbf n - \frac{1}{3}\mathbf I\right).$$

The scalar order parameter is defined as follows. If $\theta_{\mathrm{mol}}$ represents the angle between the axis of a nematic molecular and the director axis $\mathbf n$, then

$$S = \langle P_2(\cos  \theta_{\mathrm{mol}})\rangle = \frac{1}{2}\langle 3 \cos^2 \theta_{\mathrm{mol}}-1 \rangle = \frac{1}{2}\int (3 \cos^2 \theta_{\mathrm{mol}}-1)f(\theta_{\mathrm{mol}}) d\Omega$$

where $\langle\cdot\rangle$ denotes the ensemble average of the orientational angles calculated with respect to the distribution function $f(\theta_{\mathrm{mol}})$ and $d\Omega = \sin \theta_{\mathrm{mol}}d\theta_{\mathrm{mol}}d\phi_{\mathrm{mol}}$ is the solid angle. The distribution function must necessarily satisfy the condition $f(\theta_{\mathrm{mol}}+\pi) = f(\theta_{\mathrm{mol}})$ since the directors $\mathbf n$ and $-\mathbf n$ are physically equivalent.

The range for $S$ is given by $-1/2\leq S\leq 1$, with $S=1$ representing the perfect alignment of all molecules along the director and $S=0$ representing the complete random alignment (isotropic) of all molecules with respect to the director; the $S=-1/2$ case indicates that all molecules are aligned perpendicular to the director axis although such nematics are rare or hard to synthesize.

== See also ==
- Landau–de Gennes theory
