= Vsevolod Frederiks =

Vsevolod Konstantinovich Frederiks (or Fréedericksz; Russian: Всеволод Константинович Фредерикс pronounced [ˈvʲsʲɛvəɫəd fʲrʲɪdʲɪˈrʲiks]; April 29, 1885, Warsaw – January 6, 1944, Gorkiy) was a Russian/Soviet physicist. His primary contribution was in the field of liquid crystals. The Frederiks transition is named after him.

After high school, Frederiks attended the University of Geneva and attended the lectures of Paul Langevin in Paris for one semester. After defending his thesis and obtaining his PhD, Frederiks decided to continue his studies at Göttingen University. He was there for more than eight years, and with the outbreak of World War I he became a civil prisoner. During that period, he became personal assistant to David Hilbert.

In the summer of 1918, Frederiks returned to Russia, and worked at the Institute of Physics and Biophysics in Moscow. In 1919, he became a lecturer at the University of Petrograd. He was arrested by the NKVD in 1937. Although released before World War II, he died before reaching home.

== Works ==
- Fréedericksz, V.; Repiewa, A. (1927). "Theoretisches und Experimentelles zur Frage nach der Natur der anisotropen Flüssigkeiten". Zeitschrift für Physik. 42 (7): 532–546. Bibcode:1927ZPhy...42..532F. doi:10.1007/BF01397711.
- Fréedericksz, V.; Zolina, V. (1933). "Forces causing the orientation of an anisotropic liquid". Trans. Faraday Soc. 29 (140): 919–930. doi:10.1039/TF9332900919.

== Bibliography ==
- David Dunmur & Tim Sluckin (2011) Soap, Science, and Flat-screen TVs: a history of liquid crystals, pp 103–7, Oxford University Press ISBN 978-0-19-954940-5 .
- A.S. Sonin & V.Ya. Frenkel (1995) Vsevolod Konstantinovich Freédericksz, Moscow: Nauka Publishing House.
