= Biaxial nematic =

A biaxial nematic is a spatially homogeneous liquid crystal with three distinct optical axes. This is to be contrasted to a simple nematic, which has a single preferred axis, around which the system is rotationally symmetric. The symmetry group of a biaxial nematic is $D_{2h}$ i.e. that of a rectangular right parallelepiped, having 3 orthogonal $C_2$ axes and three orthogonal mirror planes. In a frame co-aligned with optical axes the second rank order parameter tensor, the so-called Q tensor of a biaxial nematic has the form

$$\mathbf Q=
\begin{pmatrix}
-\frac{1}{2}(S+P) & 0 &0 \\
0 &-\frac{1}{2}(S-P) & 0 \\
0 & 0& S\\
\end{pmatrix}$$

where $S$ is the standard nematic scalar order parameter and $P$ is a measure of the biaxiality.

The first report of a thermotropic biaxial nematic appeared in 2004 based on a boomerang shaped oxadiazole bent-core mesogen. The biaxial nematic phase for this particular compound only occurs at temperatures around 200 °C and is preceded by as yet unidentified smectic phases.

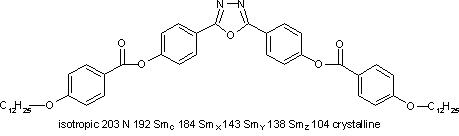
Biaxial nematic boomerang liquid crystal

It is also found that this material can segregate into chiral domains of opposite handedness. For this to happen the boomerang shaped molecules adopt a helical superstructure.

In one azo bent-core mesogen a thermal transition is found from a uniaxial N_{u} to a biaxial nematic N_{b} mesophase, as predicted by theory and simulation. This transition is observed on heating from the N_{u} phase with Polarizing optical microscopy as a change in Schlieren texture and increased light transmittance and from x-ray diffraction as the splitting of the nematic reflection. The transition is a second order transition with low energy content and therefore not observed in differential scanning calorimetry. The positional order parameter for the uniaxial nematic phase is 0.75 to 1.5 times the mesogen length and for the biaxial nematic phase 2 to 3.3 times the mesogen length.

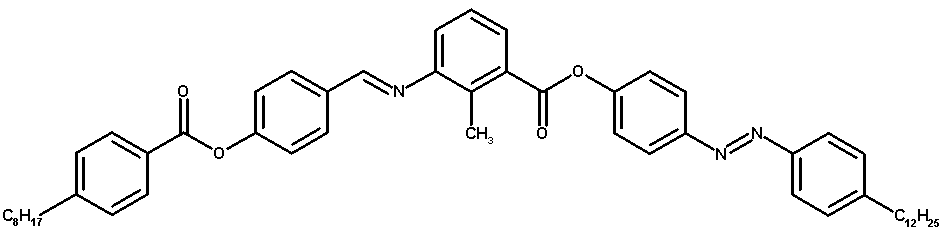
Azo bent-core mesogen thermal transitions in °C: K 82.8 Sy 93.4 Sx 104.3 Sc 118.5 Nb 149 Nu 176.5 I

Another strategy towards biaxial nematics is the use of mixtures of classical rodlike mesogens and disklike discotic mesogens. The biaxial nematic phase is expected to be located below the minimum in the rod-disk phase diagram. In one study a miscible system of rods and disks is actually found although the biaxial nematic phase remains elusive.

== See also ==
- Liquid crystal
- Liquid crystal display
- Liquid crystal polymer
- Lyotropic liquid crystal
- Plastic crystallinity
- Smart glass
- Thermochromics
