= Distortion free energy density =

The distortion free energy density is a quantity that describes the increase in the free energy density of a liquid crystal caused by distortions from its uniformly aligned configuration. It also commonly goes by the name Frank free energy density named after Charles Frank.

== Nematic liquid crystal ==
The distortion-free energy density in a nematic liquid crystal is a measure of the increase in the Helmholtz free energy per unit volume due to deviations in the orientational ordering away from a uniformly aligned nematic director configuration. The total free energy density for a nematic is therefore given by:

$$\mathcal{F}_{T}=\mathcal{F}_{0}+\mathcal{F}_{d} ,$$

where $\mathcal{F}_{T}$ is the total free energy density of a liquid crystal, $\mathcal{F}_{0}$ is the free energy density associated with a uniformly aligned nematic, and $\mathcal{F}_{d}$ is the contribution to the free energy density due to distortions in this order. For a non-chiral nematic liquid crystal, $\mathcal{F}_{d}$ is commonly taken to consist of three terms given by:

$$\mathcal{F}_{d}=\frac{1}{2}K_1(\nabla\cdot\mathbf{\hat{n}})^2+\frac{1}{2}K_2(\mathbf{\hat{n}}\cdot\nabla\times\mathbf{\hat{n}})^2+\frac{1}{2}K_3(\mathbf{\hat{n}}\times\nabla\times\mathbf{\hat{n}})^2 .$$

The unit vector $\mathbf{\hat{n}}$ is the normalized director of the molecules $(|\mathbf{\hat{n}}|=1)$, which describes the nature of the distortion. The three constants $K_i$ are known as the Frank constants and are dependent on the particular liquid crystal being described. They are usually of the order of $10^{-6}$ dyn. Each of the three terms represent a type of distortion of a nematic. The first term represents pure splay, the second term pure twist, and the third term pure bend. A combination of these terms can be used to represent an arbitrary deformation in a liquid crystal. It is often the case that all three Frank constants are of the same order of magnitude and so it is commonly approximated that $K_1=K_2=K_3=K$. This approximation is commonly referred to as the one-constant approximation and is used predominantly because the free energy simplifies when in this much more computationally compact form:

$$\mathcal{F}_{d}=\frac{1}{2}K
\left[(\nabla\cdot\mathbf{\hat{n}})^2+|\nabla\times\mathbf{\hat{n}}|^2 \right]= \frac{1}{2}K |\nabla\mathbf{\hat{n}}|^2.$$

A fourth term is also commonly added to the Frank free energy density called the saddle-splay energy that describes the surface interaction. It is often ignored when calculating director field configurations since the energies in the bulk of the liquid crystal are often greater than those due to the surface. It is given by:

$$\frac{1}{2}K_{4}\nabla\cdot \left[(\mathbf{\hat{n}}\cdot\nabla)\mathbf{\hat{n}}-\mathbf{\mathbf{\hat{n}}}(\nabla\cdot \mathbf{\hat{n}}) \right] .$$

If inclusions are added to a liquid crystal, an additional term contributes to the free energy density due to their presence, often characterized by a term known as the Rapini approximation:

$$\mathcal{F}_{s}=-\oint\frac{1}{2}W(\mathbf{\hat{n}}\cdot\mathbf{\hat{\nu}})^2\mathrm{d}S .$$

The anchoring energy is given by $W$ and the unit vector $\mathbf{\hat{\nu}}$ is normal to the particles surface.

== Chiral liquid crystal ==
For the case when the liquid crystal consists of chiral molecules, an additional term to the distortion free energy density is added. The term changes sign when the axes are inverted and is given by:

$$\mathcal{F}_{Ch}=k_2(\mathbf{\hat{n}}\cdot\nabla\times\mathbf{\hat{n}}) .$$

The prefactor $k_2$ is dependent on the degree of molecular chirality. Therefore, for the case of a chiral liquid crystal, the total free energy density is given by:

$$\mathcal{F}_{T}=\mathcal{F}_{0}+\frac{1}{2}K_1(\nabla\cdot\mathbf{\hat{n}})^2+\frac{1}{2}K_2(\mathbf{\hat{n}}\cdot\nabla\times\mathbf{\hat{n}}+q_0)^2+\frac{1}{2}K_3(\mathbf{\hat{n}}\times\nabla\times\mathbf{\hat{n}})^2 .$$

The quantity $q_0=2 \pi /P_0$ describes the pitch $P_0$ of the cholesteric helix.

== Electric and magnetic field contributions ==
As a result of liquid crystal mesogens' anisotropic diamagnetic properties and electrical polarizability, electric and magnetic fields can induce alignments in liquid crystals. By applying a field, one is effectively lowering the free energy of the liquid crystal.

To understand the effect a magnetic field produces on the distortion free energy density, a small region of local nematic order $\mathbf{\hat{n}}$ is often considered in which $\chi_\perp$ and $\chi_\parallel$ is the magnetic susceptibility perpendicular and parallel to $\mathbf{\hat{n}}$. The value $\Delta\chi\equiv\chi_\parallel-\chi_\perp=N<P_2(\cos{\theta})>$, where N is the number of mesogens per unit volume. The work per unit volume done by the field is then given by:

$$W_{\rm magnetic}=\int_{0}^{H}(-M_\perp\sin{\theta}-M_\parallel\cos{\theta})\, \mathrm{d}H=-\frac{H^2}{2}(\chi_\perp+\Delta\chi\cos{\theta}^2) ,$$

where:

$$M_\parallel=H\chi_\parallel\cos{\theta}$$
$$M_\perp=H\chi_\perp\sin{\theta} .$$

Since the $-\frac{H^2\chi_\perp}{2}$ term is spatially invariant, it can be ignored and so the magnetic contribution to the distortion free energy density becomes:

$$-\frac{\Delta\chi}{2}[\mathbf{H}\cdot\mathbf{\hat{n}}]^2 .$$

From similar arguments the electric field's contribution to the distortion free energy can be found and is given by:

$$-\frac{\Delta\epsilon}{8\pi}[\mathbf{E}\cdot\mathbf{\hat{n}}]^2 .$$

The quantity $\Delta\epsilon\equiv\epsilon_\parallel-\epsilon_\perp$ is the difference between the local dielectric constants perpendicular and parallel to $\mathbf{\hat{n}}$.
