= Liquid Crystal Institute =

Coordinates: 41°8′39.45″N 81°20′23.68″W

Glenn H. Brown Liquid Crystal Institute
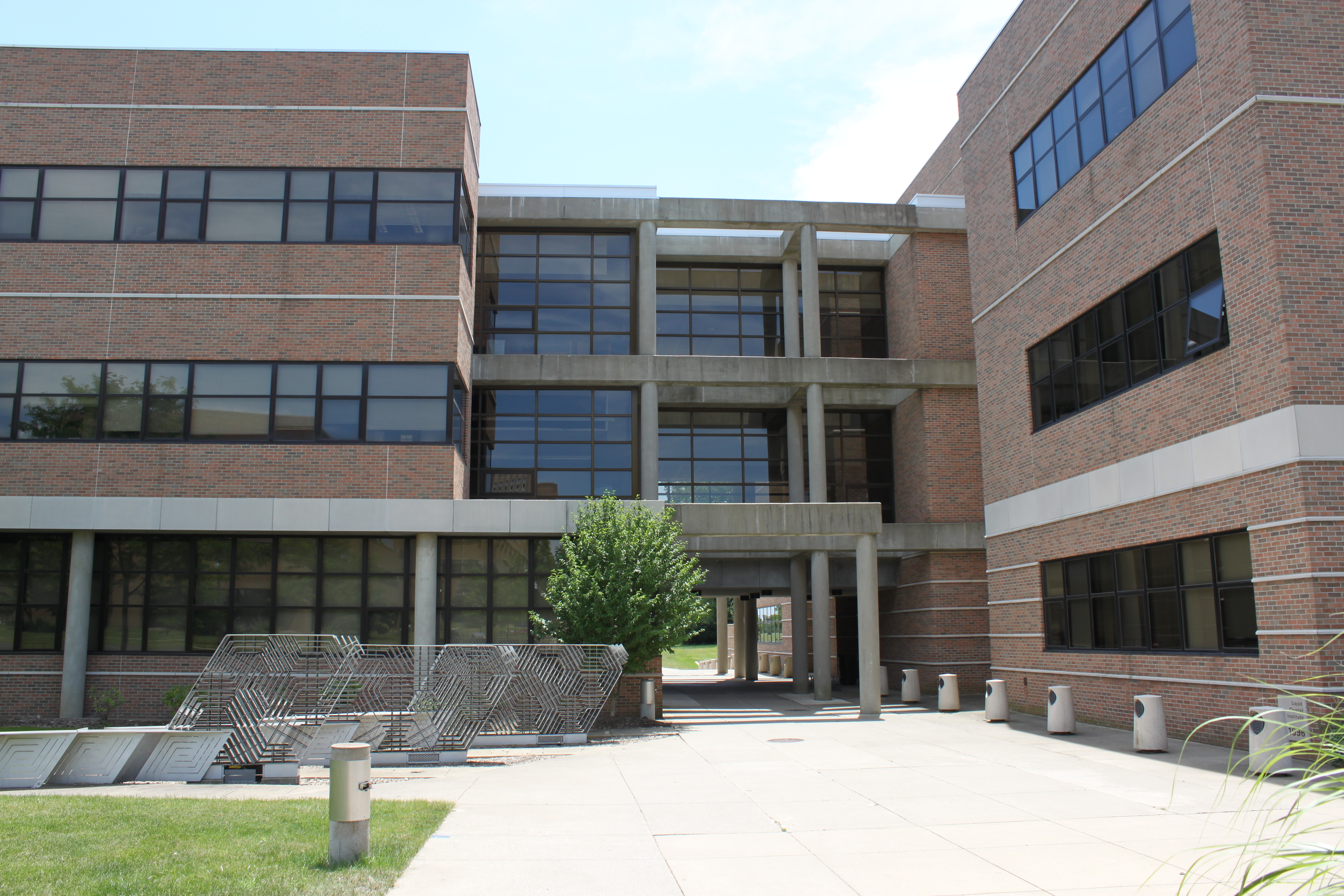
- Liquid Crystal Research Building at Kent State University from Science Mall
- Type: Public
- Established: 1965
- Director: Torsten Hegmann
- Location: Kent, Ohio, U.S.
- Website: www.kent.edu/amlci

The former Glenn H. Brown Liquid Crystal Institute (LCI) at Kent State University is now renamed the Advanced Materials and Liquid Crystal Institute. The AMLCI is a center of study for liquid crystal technology and education, blending basic and applied research on liquid crystals. This approach has resulted in technological advances and new applications such as display tablets, optical shutters, variable transmission windows, projection display devices, and flexible displays. Established in 1965, the institute is now directed by Torsten Hegmann and is housed at KSU's Liquid Crystal and Materials Sciences building, completed in 1996.

The LCI is home to the Chemical Physics Interdisciplinary Program, which offers masters and Ph.D. studies in the physics and chemistry of liquid crystals and their applications. The program is open to incoming students with degrees in physics, chemistry, engineering, and materials science.

== Directors ==
There have been five directors of the Liquid Crystal Institute.

- Glenn H. Brown (1965–1983)

Glenn H. Brown founded the Liquid Crystal Institute in 1965. In 1986 the Kent State University Board of Trustees honored him by naming the institute after him.

- J. William Doane (1983–1996)

Bill Doane received his Ph.D. in Physics from the University of Missouri-Columbia in 1965; he became a member of the Kent State University faculty the same year. In 1983 he became Director of the Liquid Crystal Institute and in 1991 the ALCOM Center's first director, serving in both capacities until his retirement from the University in 1996.

- John L. West (1996–2003, 2016–2019)
- Oleg D. Lavrentovich (2003–2011)
- Hiroshi Yokoyama (2011–2016)
- Torsten Hegmann (2019–present)
