= LCD manufacturing =

Process of making liquid crystal display (LCD) panels

LCD manufacturing is the process of making liquid crystal display (LCD) panels. It involves using glass and silicon substrates. Photolithography is used to pattern the substrates, and liquid crystal materials are added. In the case of a color TFT LCD, color filters are patterned in layers to make red, green, and blue pixels.

Liquid crystal displays are manufactured in cleanrooms, borrowing techniques from semiconductor device manufacturing.

== Process ==
A class of photolithography known as display lithography is used to etch patterns into substrates.

LCD manufacturing shares some of the process with OLED manufacturing.

The process flow involves multiple separate components that are joined together: a process for making a thin-film transistor (TFT) backplane, a process for making color filters, and a liquid crystal cell process.

Large-scale chemical vapor deposition (CVD) systems have been used in the manufacture of LCDs.

Once LCD panels are manufactured, they can be measured for color quality and panel uniformity using characterization equipment.

=== TFT backplane process ===
TFT backplanes are made using photolithography techniques, which involve using photomasks. The photomask(s) are used to create TFTs on a substrate, which involves formation of a gate layer, source/drain layer formation, and contact-hole formation.

The TFT backplane process involves patterning of indium tin oxide (ITO), which is a transparent and electrically conductive material.

Conventional LCDs use a back-channel etched (BCE) TFT display pixel structure.

=== Liquid crystal cell process ===
The cell process involves layer alignment, sealant formation, and depositing liquid crystal. The panels are then bonded and cut into individual displays.

A technique that can be used is one drop fill (ODF).

UV photocuring equipment can be used for bonding LCD panels.

=== Modules ===
An LCD module (LCM) is a ready-to-use LCD with a backlight. Thus, a factory that makes LCD modules does not necessarily make LCDs, it may only assemble them into the modules.

An LCD panel is attached to a driver board using anisotropic conductive film.

== Generations ==
LCD-Glass-sizes-generation

LCDs are manufactured using large sheets of glass whose size has increased over time. Several displays are manufactured at the same time, and then cut from the sheet of glass, also known as the mother glass or LCD glass substrate. The increase in size allows more displays or larger displays to be made, just like with increasing wafer sizes in semiconductor manufacturing. The glass sizes are as follows:

Generation	Length (mm)	Height (mm)	Year of introduction	References
GEN 1	200–300	200–400	1990	
GEN 2	370	470		
GEN 3	550	650	1996–1998	
GEN 3.5	600	720	1996	
GEN 4	680	880	2000–2002	
GEN 4.5	730	920	2000–2004	
GEN 5	1100	1250–1300	2002–2004	
GEN 5.5	1300	1500		
GEN 6	1500	1800–1850	2002–2004	
GEN 7	1870	2200	2003	
GEN 7.5	1950	2250		
GEN 8	2160	2460		
GEN 8.5 (Note: Sometimes incorrectly referred to as GEN 8.)	2200	2500	2007–2016	
GEN 8.6	2250	2600	2016	
GEN 8.7 (Note: Sometimes incorrectly referred to as GEN 8.6.)	2290	2620	2026	
GEN 10	2880	3130	2009	
GEN 10.5 (Note: Also known as GEN 11.)	2940	3370	2018	

In 2004, Sharp started manufacturing panels using the 6th-generation glass size, which is 1.8 meters by 1.5 meters.

Until Gen 8, manufacturers would not agree on a single mother glass size and as a result, different manufacturers would use slightly different glass sizes for the same generation. Some manufacturers have adopted Gen 8.6 mother glass sheets which are only slightly larger than Gen 8.5, allowing for more 50- and 58-inch LCDs to be made per mother glass, specially 58-inch LCDs, in which case 6 can be produced on a Gen 8.6 mother glass vs only 3 on a Gen 8.5 mother glass, significantly reducing waste. The thickness of the mother glass also increases with each generation, so larger mother glass sizes are better suited for larger displays.

== Companies ==
Companies that have made or sold LCD panels include:

- Sharp Corporation
- Japan Display
- AUO Corporation

Companies that have produced FPD lithography equipment include Canon and Nikon.

LCD glass substrates are made by companies such as AGC Inc., Corning Inc., and Nippon Electric Glass.

Display lithography equipment include the H803T and H1003T from Canon. Display Technologies, Inc. is a defunct joint venture that manufactured LCD panels.

== Materials ==
Optically clear adhesives are used to bond display components in the manufacturing process.

== See also ==
- Liquid crystal on silicon
