= MBBA =

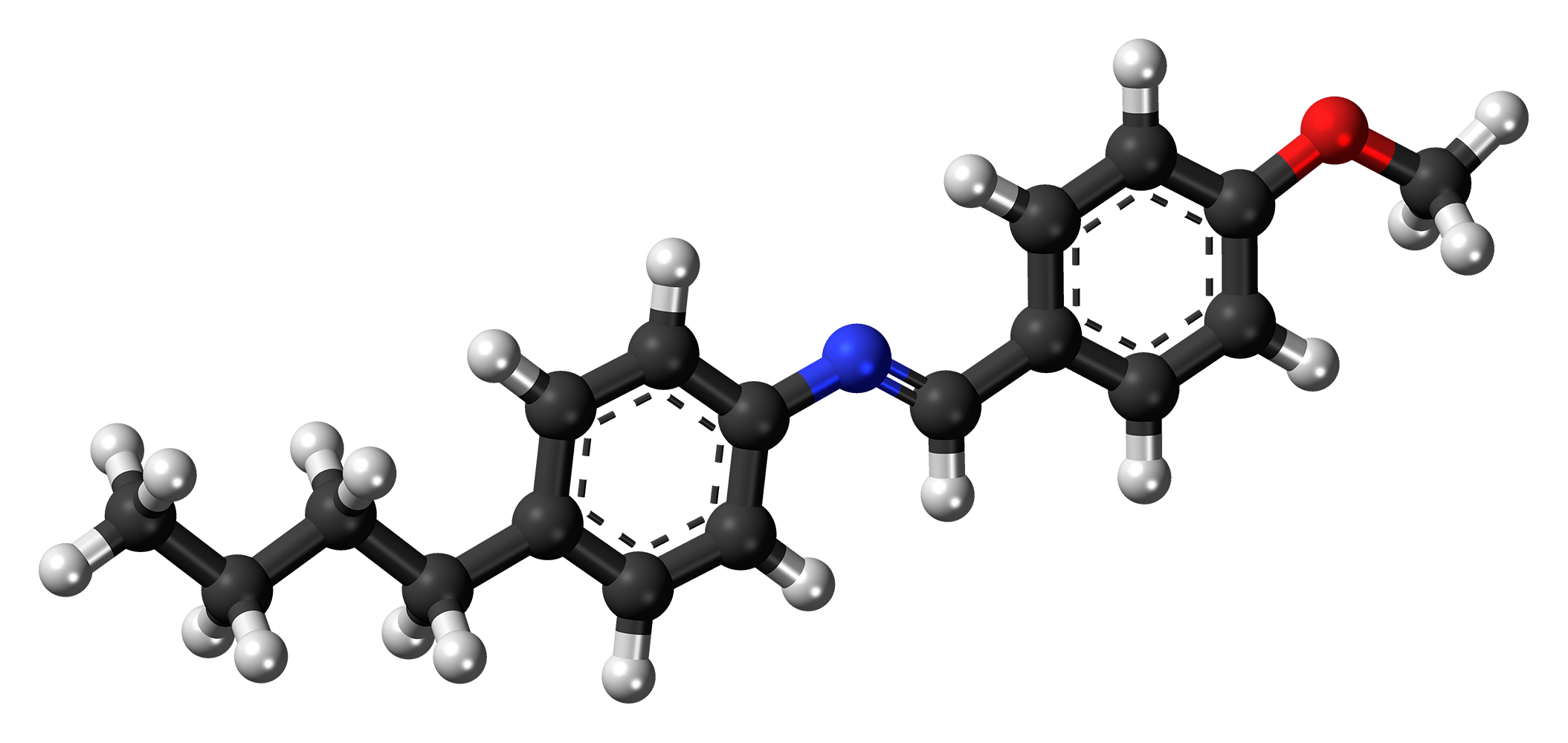

Names
- Preferred IUPAC name N-(4-Butylphenyl)-1-(4-methoxyphenyl)methanimine

Identifiers
CAS Number	26227-73-6
3D model (JSmol)	Interactive image
ChemSpider	30817
PubChem CID	33363
UNII	O69C41149Y
CompTox Dashboard (EPA)	DTXSID8025549
- InChI: InChI=1S/C18H21NO/c1-3-4-5-15-6-10-17(11-7-15)19-14-16-8-12-18(20-2)13-9-16/h6-14H,3-5H2,1-2H3/b19-14+ Key: FEIWNULTQYHCDN-XMHGGMMESA-N; InChI=1/C18H21NO/c1-3-4-5-15-6-10-17(11-7-15)19-14-16-8-12-18(20-2)13-9-16/h6-14H,3-5H2,1-2H3/b19-14+ Key: FEIWNULTQYHCDN-XMHGGMMEBZ
- SMILES: CCCCC1=CC=C(C=C1)N=CC2=CC=C(C=C2)OC

Properties
Chemical formula	C_{18}H_{21}NO
Molar mass	267.372 g·mol^{−1}
Appearance	Turbid yellow liquid
Density	1.027 g/mL at 25 °C

Hazards
NFPA 704 (fire diamond)	0 1 0
Flash point	113 °C (235 °F)
Safety data sheet (SDS)	Sigma-Aldrich
- Except where otherwise noted, data are given for materials in their standard state (at 25 °C [77 °F], 100 kPa). verify (what is ?) Infobox references

N-(4-Methoxybenzylidene)-4-butylaniline (MBBA) is an organic compound often used as a liquid crystal.
