= Chandrasekhar family =

Indian family, several of whom are notable in physics

- Current region: South India
- Origin: Tamil Nadu, India
- Members: C. V. Raman; Subrahmanyan Chandrasekhar; Venkatraman Radhakrishnan; Sivaramakrishna Ramaseshan; Sivaramakrishna Chandrasekhar; Sivaramakrishna Pancharatnam; V. Shanta; Chidambara Chandrasekaran; Vidya Shankar
- Distinctions: physics; crystallography; meteorology; astronomy; literature; mathematics; demography; biostatistics; medicine; musicology

The Chandrasekhar family is a distinguished Indian intellectual family, several of whose members achieved eminence, notably in the field of physics. Two members of the family, Sir C. V. Raman and his nephew, Subrahmanyan Chandrasekhar, were Nobel laureates in physics.

This family does not have a surname and majority of its members follow a patronymic naming custom, which could either be (father's name - name) or (name - father's name).

Members of the Chandrasekhar family are all descended from R. Chandrasekhara Iyer, hence the repeated usage of this name, which is spelled in various ways. The family caste name "Aiyar" is sometimes spelled "Iyer" or "Ayyar".

== Family tree ==
- R. Chandrasekhara Iyer (1866–1910), m. Parvati Ammal (1869–1916)
  - Chandrasekhara Subrahmanyan Iyer (1885–1960), m. Sitalakshmi Iyer (1891–1931)
    - Rajalakshmi, m.
      - Uma (born 1938), m. Parameswaran. Noted Indo-Canadian writer of South Asian-Canadian literature; former English professor at the University of Winnipeg.
    - Balaparvathi, m. Viswanathan
      - V. Shanta (1927–2021)
    - Subrahmanyan Chandrasekhar (1910–1995), m. Lalitha Doraiswamy (1910–2013)
    - Vishwanathan (1911–1979)
    - Balakrishnan (born 1914), famous as Purasu Balakrishnnan, author of The Big Bang & Brahma's day and Glimpses of Kalidasa
    - Ramanathan
    - Sarada
    - Vidya Shankar (1919–2010), famous Carnatic veena player and musicologist
    - Savitri
    - Sundari
  - Chandrasekhara Venkata Raman (1888–1970), m. Lokasundari Ammal (1892–1980)
    - Chandrasekhar (Raja) Raman
    - Venkatraman Radhakrishnan (1929–2011), m. Francoise-Dominique Barnard
      - Vivek Radhakrishnan (born c. 1976), m. Namrata Kini
  - Mangalam (1891–1918), m. Chidambara
    - Chidambara Chandrasekaran (1911–2000)
  - Kumaraswami (Skandan, 1894–1914)
  - Sundaram (1898–1907)
  - Sitalakshmi (1901–1972), m. R.B.S. Sivaramakrishnan
    - S. Ramaseshan (1923–2003)
    - Sivaramakrishna Chandrasekhar (1930–2004)
    - S. Pancharatnam (1934–1969)
  - Meena (1903–1912)
  - Chandrasekhara Ramaswamy (1907–1991), m.
    - 3 sons.

== First generation ==
- Chandrasekhara Venkata (C. V.) Raman FNA, FASc, FRS, was a distinguished physicist whose achievements in the field of light scattering earned him the 1930 Nobel Prize for Physics. He discovered that when light traverses a transparent material, the wavelengths of some of the deflected light change. This phenomenon, now known as Raman scattering, results from the eponymous effect.
- Chandrasekhara Ramaswamy FASc (brother of C. V. Raman) was a noted meteorologist who served as Director-General of the Indian Meteorological Department (1965–1967). He conducted research into the regional and global effects of Indian monsoonal patterns.
- Chandrasekhara Subrahmanya Ayyar (brother of C. V. Raman) joined Indian Finance Service (now Indian Audit and Accounts Service)

== Second generation ==
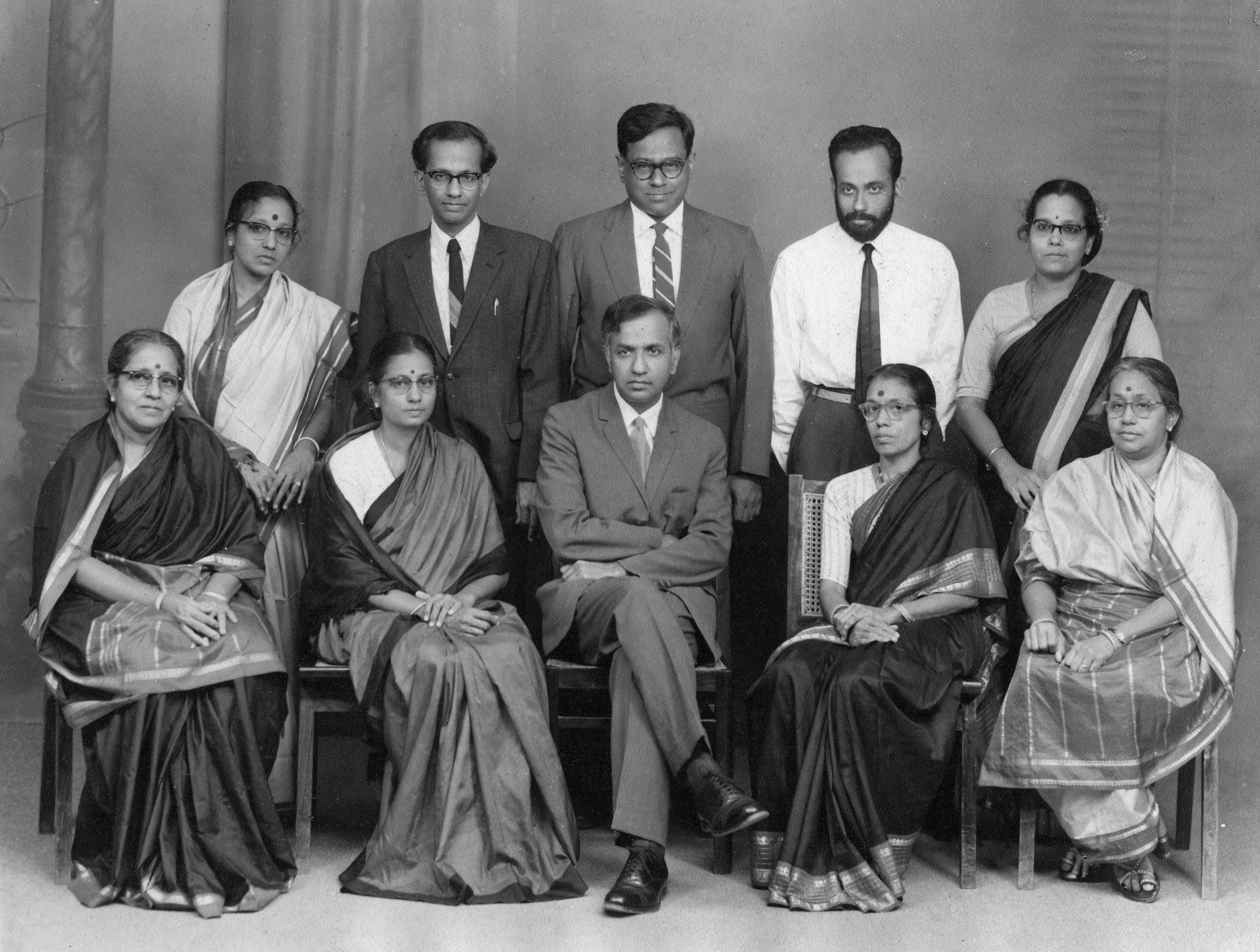
S. Chandrasekhar with his brothers and sisters in Madras [Chennai], India. From left to right seated are: Bala, Savitri, Chandra, Sarada, Rajam; standing: Vidya, Balakrishnan, Vishwam, Ramanathan, Sundari.

- Venkatraman Radhakrishnan FASc (son of C. V. Raman) was a distinguished astrophysicist credited with expanding the field of radio astronomy and for research in pulsars, interstellar clouds and various celestial bodies.
- Subrahmanyan Chandrasekhar FNA, FASc, FRS (nephew of C. V. Raman) was an Indian American astrophysicist who was awarded the 1983 Nobel Prize for Physics with William A. Fowler "for his theoretical studies of the physical processes of importance to the structure and evolution of the stars". His mathematical treatment of stellar evolution yielded many of the best current theoretical models of the later evolutionary stages of massive stars and black holes. The Chandrasekhar limit is named after him.
- Sivaraj Ramaseshan FNA, FASc (nephew of C. V. Raman) was a distinguished crystallographer, director of the Indian Institute of Science (1981–1984), and president of the Indian Academy of Sciences (1983–1985).
- Sivaramakrishna Chandrasekhar FNA, FASc, FRS (nephew of C. V. Raman) was a distinguished physicist and pioneer in the field of liquid crystal technology who served as founder-president of the International Liquid Crystal Society. His efforts helped to establish the indigenous manufacture of liquid crystal displays in India. In 1977, he and his co-workers discovered the columnar phase of liquid crystals.
- Shivaramakrishnan Pancharatnam FASc (nephew of C. V. Raman) was a distinguished optical physicist who, in 1956, discovered the properties of what is now known as the geometric phase (sometimes known as the Pancharatnam phase) for polarized beams passing through crystals.
- Chidambara Chandrasekaran FASc (nephew of C. V. Raman) was an accomplished demographer and biostatistician. In 1949, together with W. Edwards Deming, he devised the Chandra-Deming formula to estimate numbers of vital events by comparing results from two different systems. He was director of the Demographic Training and Research Centre, Mumbai (later renamed the International Institute of Population Sciences) from 1959 to 1964, and conducted several landmark demographic studies for the Indian government, the World Bank and the United Nations. He was president of the International Union for the Scientific Study of Population (IUSSP) from 1969 to 1973.
- Vidya Shankar (niece of C. V. Raman) was a distinguished musicologist and vainika (veena musician) who received the Sangeet Natak Akademi Award in 2007.

== Third generation ==
- V. Shanta (great-niece of C. V. Raman, niece of Subrahmanyan Chandrasekhar) was a prominent oncologist and researcher. In 2005, she received the Ramon Magsaysay Award for Public Service.
- Uma Parameswaran (great-niece of C. V. Raman, niece of Subrahmanyan Chandrasekhar) is a noted Indo-Canadian author of South Asian literature and a biographer of her great-uncle C. V. Raman.

== Sources ==
- Parameswaran, Uma (2011). C. V. Raman: a biography. Penguin Books. ISBN 9780143066897
- Wali, Kameshwar C. (1991). Chandra: a biography of S. Chandrasekhar. The University of Chicago Press. ISBN 0-226-87054-5.
