= Discotic liquid crystal =

Discotic liquid crystals are mesophases formed from disc-shaped molecules known as "discotic mesogens". These phases are often also referred to as columnar phases. Discotic mesogens are typically composed of an aromatic core surrounded by flexible alkyl chains. The aromatic cores allow charge transfer in the stacking direction through the π conjugate systems. The charge transfer allows the discotic liquid crystals to be electrically semiconductive along the stacking direction. Applications have been focusing on using these systems in photovoltaic devices, organic light emitting diodes (OLED), and molecular wires. Discotics have also been suggested for use in compensation films, for LCD displays. Sivaramakrishna Chandrasekhar who first discovered these systems, did lots of important work on liquid crystals, and founded the International Liquid Crystal Society. He was Sir C V Raman's nephew, and brother of Pancharatnam of the geometric phase fame, and cousin of Subrahmanyam Chandrasekhar.

== Photovoltaic devices ==
Discotic liquid crystals have similar potential to the conducting polymers for their use in photovoltaic cells, they have the same technical challenges of low conductivity and sensitivity to UV damage as the polymer designs. However one advantage is the self-healing properties of the discotic mesogens. So far the photovoltaic applications have been limited, using a perylene and hexabenzocoronene mesogens in a simple two layer systems has only resulted in ~2% power efficiency.

== Organic light emitting diodes ==
So far the study into discotic liquid crystals for light emitting diodes are still in its infancy, but there have been some examples produced; a triphenylene and perylene-mesogen combination can be used to make a red LED. The self-assembly properties make them more desirable for manufacturing purposes when producing commercial electronics, than the currently used small molecule crystals in Sony’s new OLED displays. Also they have the added benefit of the self-healing properties that both the small molecule and the polymers lack as conductors, potentially being beneficial for longevity OLED products.
