= C18H12 =

The molecular formula C_{18}H_{12} may refer to:

- Benz[a]anthracene, or benzo[a]anthracene
- Benzo[c]phenanthrene
- Chrysene
- Tetracene, also called naphthacene
- Triphenylene
