= Ekalavya (disambiguation) =

Eklavya is a character from the ancient Indian epic Mahabharata.

Eklavya can also refer to:

- Eklavya (film), a 2007 Indian Hindi-language film
- Eklavya (2023 film), a 2023 Indian Bengali-language film
- Ekalavyan (film), a 1993 Indian Malayalam-language film
- Ekalavyan (novelist), Indian novelist
- Ekalavya Award, sports award in India
- Eklavya Dwivedi, Indian cricketer
- Eklavya foundation, an Indian NGO
- Eklavya Model Residential School, a network of schools run by the Government of India
- Eklavya Sports Stadium, Agra, India
- Eklavya Technology Channel, Indian distance learning programme
- Ekalavya Temple, Hindu temple in Haryana, India
- Eklavya University, university in Damoh, Madhya Pradesh, India
