= Somnath Bharadwaj =

Indian theoretical physicist (born 1964)

- Born: 28 October 1964 (age 61); Kolkata, West Bengal, India
- Education: St. Xavier's School; St. James' School; Indian Institute of Technology; Indian Institute of Science & Raman Research Institute
- Scientific career
- Fields: Physics
- Workplaces: Harish-Chandra Research Institute; Indian Institute of Technology & Centre for Theoretical Studies
- Doctoral advisor: Rajaram Nityananda

Somnath Bharadwaj (born 28 October 1964) is an Indian theoretical physicist who works on Theoretical Astrophysics and Cosmology.

Bharadwaj was born in India, studied at the Indian Institute of Technology in Kharagpur, and later received his PhD from the Indian Institute of Science. After having worked at the Harish-Chandra Research Institute, he is now a professor at IIT Kharagpur. He has made significant contributions to the dynamics of large-scale structure formation.

In 2003, he was selected to be one of the professors from IIT whose class room lectures would be broadcast in the Eklavya Technology Channel.

Bharadwaj was an invited speakers on Galaxy Formation at the prestigious Indo-US Frontier of Science symposium which was organized by the U.S. National Academy of Sciences in 2005.

He is currently in the editorial board of the Journal of Astrophysics & Astronomy published by the Indian Academy of Sciences.
