= V. Radhakrishnan =

V. Radhakrishnan may refer to:

- Velusami Radhakrishnan (born 1952), Sri Lankan politician
- Venkatraman Radhakrishnan (1929–2011), Indian scientist
