= C30H18 =

The molecular formula C_{30}H_{18} (molar mass: 378.46 g/mol, exact mass: 378.1409 u) may refer to:

- 9,10-Bis(phenylethynyl)anthracene (BPEA)
- Heptacene
- Trinaphthylene
