= V. Shanta =

Indian cancer specialist (1927–2021)

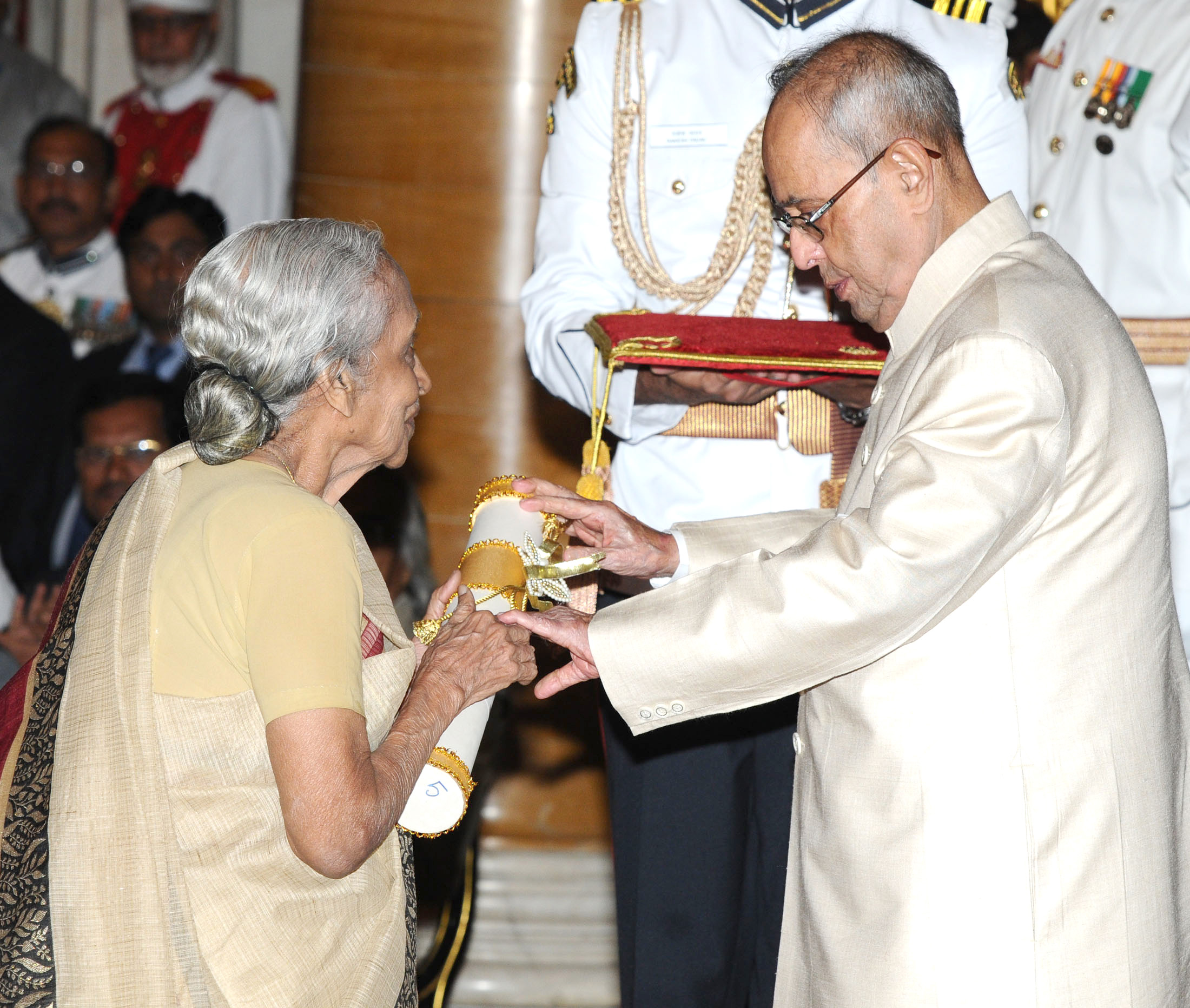
- Pranab Mukherjee, President of India, presenting the Padma Vibhushan to Shanta
- Born: 11 March 1927; Madras, Madras Presidency, British India
- Died: 19 January 2021 (aged 93); Chennai, Tamil Nadu
- Education: Madras Medical College (MBBS, MD)
- Occupation: Chairperson of Adyar Cancer Institute
- Awards: Ramon Magsaysay Award; Padma Vibhushan; Padma Bhushan; Padma Shri

Viswanathan Shanta (11 March 1927 – 19 January 2021) was an Indian oncologist and the chairperson of the Adyar Cancer Institute, Chennai. She is best known for her efforts towards making quality and affordable cancer treatment accessible to all patients in her country. She dedicated herself to the mission of organizing care for cancer patients, study of the disease, research on its prevention and cure, spreading awareness about the disease, and developing specialists and scientists in various subspecialties of oncology. Her work won her several awards, including the Magsaysay Award, Padma Shri, Padma Bhushan, and Padma Vibhushan, the second highest civilian award given by the Government of India.

She was associated with Adyar Cancer Institute since 1955, and held several positions, including that of the director of the institute, between 1980 and 1997. She served as a member of several national and international committees on health and medicine, including the World Health Organization's Advisory Committee on Health.

== Early life and education ==
Shanta was born on 11 March 1927, at Mylapore, Chennai, into a distinguished family that included two Nobel Laureates: C. V. Raman (grand uncle) and S. Chandrasekar (uncle). She did her schooling from National Girls High School (now Lady Sivaswami Ayyar Girls Higher Secondary School) and by the age of 12 she had made up her mind to become a doctor. She did her pre-medical study in Presidency College and obtained her M.B.B.S from the Madras Medical College in 1949, D.G.O. in 1952, and M.D. (in Obstetrics & Gynecology) in 1955.

== Career ==
When Dr. Muthulakshmi Reddy set up the Cancer Institute in 1954, Shanta had just finished her Doctor of Medicine (M.D.). She had passed the Public Service Commission examination and had been posted to the Women and Children Hospital. In the 1940s and 1950s, Indian women who entered the medical profession generally entered the field of obstetrics and gynecology, but Shanta joined the Cancer Institute instead, upsetting many people.

The institute began as a small, 12-bed cottage hospital with a single building, minimal equipment and just two doctors, Shanta and Krishnamurthi. For three years she worked as honorary staff until the Institute offered to pay her Rs.200 per month and residence within the campus. She moved into the campus on 13 April 1955, and remained there until her death on 19 January 2021.

During her long career of over 60 years, Shanta held several positions at the Cancer Institute and served as its director between 1980 and 1997. She was personally concerned about the quality of patient care and believed that a physician's role went beyond treatment and that caring for patients was essential to that role. She developed protocols that went beyond treatment and encompassed holistic care. In addition to caregiving for patients and study of the disease, she focused on creating a pool of specialists and scientists at the institute. She was an advocate of early detection of cancer and the need to change public perception of the disease, especially the extreme fear and hopelessness associated with the disease. She was particularly critical of the metaphorical usage of the name of the disease to describe a dangerous and uncontrollable situation or one of hopelessness.

Shanta served as a member of several national and international committees on health and medicine, including the World Health Organization's Advisory Committee on Health. She was also a member of the Tamil Nadu State Planning Commission for Health.

== Awards ==
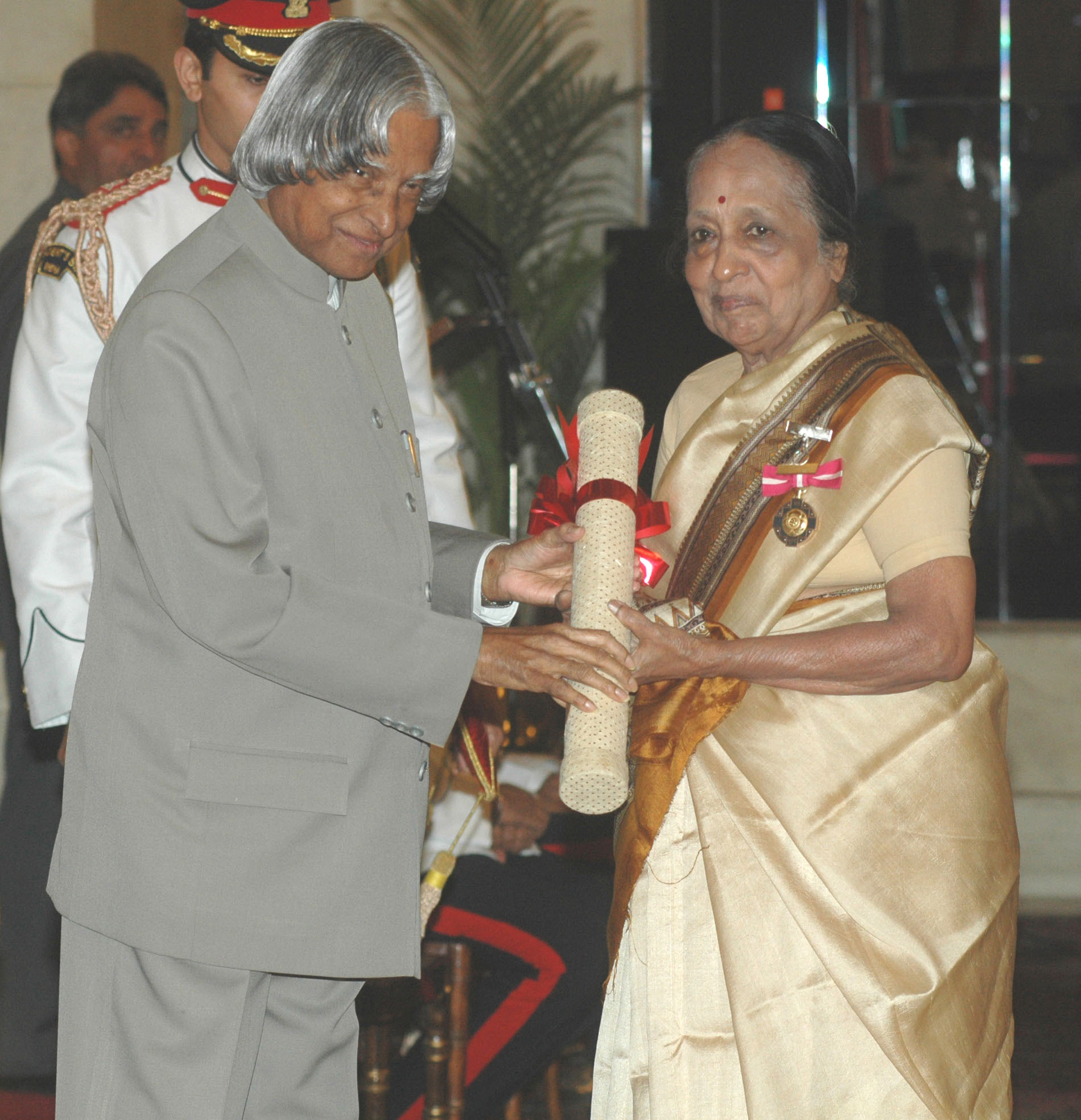
Dr. A.P.J. Abdul Kalam, President of India, presenting the Padma Bhushan to Shanta, in New Delhi on 20 March 2006

Shanta, an elected fellow of the National Academy of Medical Sciences, was a recipient of the Padma Shri award in 1986, Padma Bhushan, in 2006 and Padma Vibhushan in 2016.

She received the Ramon Magsaysay Award in 2005, and dedicated the award to her institute. The award citation is worth quoting to describe aptly Dr. Shanta's service. It reads in part:

"In an era when specialised medical care in India has become highly commercialised, Dr. Shanta strives to ensure that the Institute remains true to its ethos, `Service to all.' Its services are free or subsidised for some 60 per cent of its 100,000 annual patients [...] seventy-eight-year-old Shanta still sees patients, still performs surgery, and is still on call twenty-four hours a day."

== Death ==
Shanta died aged 93 on 19 January 2021. She had complained of chest pain the previous night and was rushed to a private hospital though she had initially insisted on being medically managed within her Institute's campus and did not want invasive ventilation. She was diagnosed as having a massive heart block that could not be rectified.
