= All India Institute of Hygiene and Public Health =

Public Health School in Kolkata, India

- Motto: svacchaṁ bhavatu bhāratam
- Motto in English: May India Be Clean and Healthy
- Recognition: National Medical Commission
- Type: Public Health School
- Established: 30 December 1932; 93 years ago
- Academic affiliations: West Bengal University of Health Sciences
- Budget: ₹107.49 crore (US$11.2 million) (2025–26)
- Director: Dr. Manas Kumar Kundu
- Students: Total Seats: MD - 20; MPH - 7
- Location: Kolkata, West Bengal, India; 22°34′34″N 88°21′31″E
- Campus: Large city
- Language: English
- Acronym: AIIH&PH
- Journal: Indian Journal of Hygiene and Public Health
- Website: aiihph.gov.in

All India Institute of Hygiene and Public Health (AIIH&PH) is a pioneering Indian institute for research and training in public health and allied sciences in Kolkata. It was established on 30 December 1932 with assistance from the Rockefeller Foundation. It functions under Director General of Health Services, New Delhi, Ministry of Health & Family Welfare, Government of India and is now affiliated with West Bengal University of Health Sciences, established in 2003. It also has a rural training centre in Singur and urban training centre in Chetla.

In 1943, the borehole latrine was developed by AIIH&PH in collaboration with the Rockefeller Foundation.

== History ==
Established with the aid of Rockefeller Foundation, AIIH&PH was inaugurated by Sir John Anderson, the Governor of Bengal on 30 December 1932. The AIIH&PH was a constituent college of the University of Calcutta. Since its inception, the college has collaborated with the Calcutta School of Tropical Medicine. In 1953, the institute was accredited by WHO and UNICEF as an International Training Centre. The institute carried out the first village health survey in India in 1944–1945, in which a general health survey of nearly 1200 families comprising 7000 members in West Bengal was done. After independence, extension plans were drawn in 1950, at a cost of 90 lakhs, shared equally by Union Health Ministry and United Nations International Children's Emergency Fund, to build a Child and Maternity Health section at the institute.

In 1995, a public health scientist Dr. Smarajit Jana of AIIH&PH for Durbar Mahila Samanwaya Committee, sex worker's organisation which works for prevention of HIV/AIDS amongst its 65,000 sex workers. In 2004, the AIIH&PH became affiliated to the newly formed West Bengal University of Health Sciences (WBUHS).

In March 2023 Government planning to revive The institute, transforming it into a world-class 'School of Public Health' also plans to convert it into a Deemed university/Deemed Public Health University.

== Departments ==
Departments of AIIH&PH
- Biochemistry and Nutrition
- Epidemiology
- Health Promotion and education
- Maternity and Child health
- Microbiology
- Occupational Health
- Public Health Administration
- Nursing
- Sanitary Engineering
- Preventive and social medicine
- Statistics

It is also one of the nine institutions in India, which offer Post-Graduate Diploma in Public Health Management. While the main campus is at Chittaranjan Avenue, in 2011 its second campus at Salt Lake City, Kolkata also became operational.

== Notable faculty ==
- Chidambara Chandrasekaran, Indian demographer and statistician

== See also ==
- Ministry of Health and Family Welfare
- Central Health Service (CHS)
- List of institutions of higher education in West Bengal
- Education in India
- Education in West Bengal
