= Triphenylene =

- Skeletal formula with numbering convention

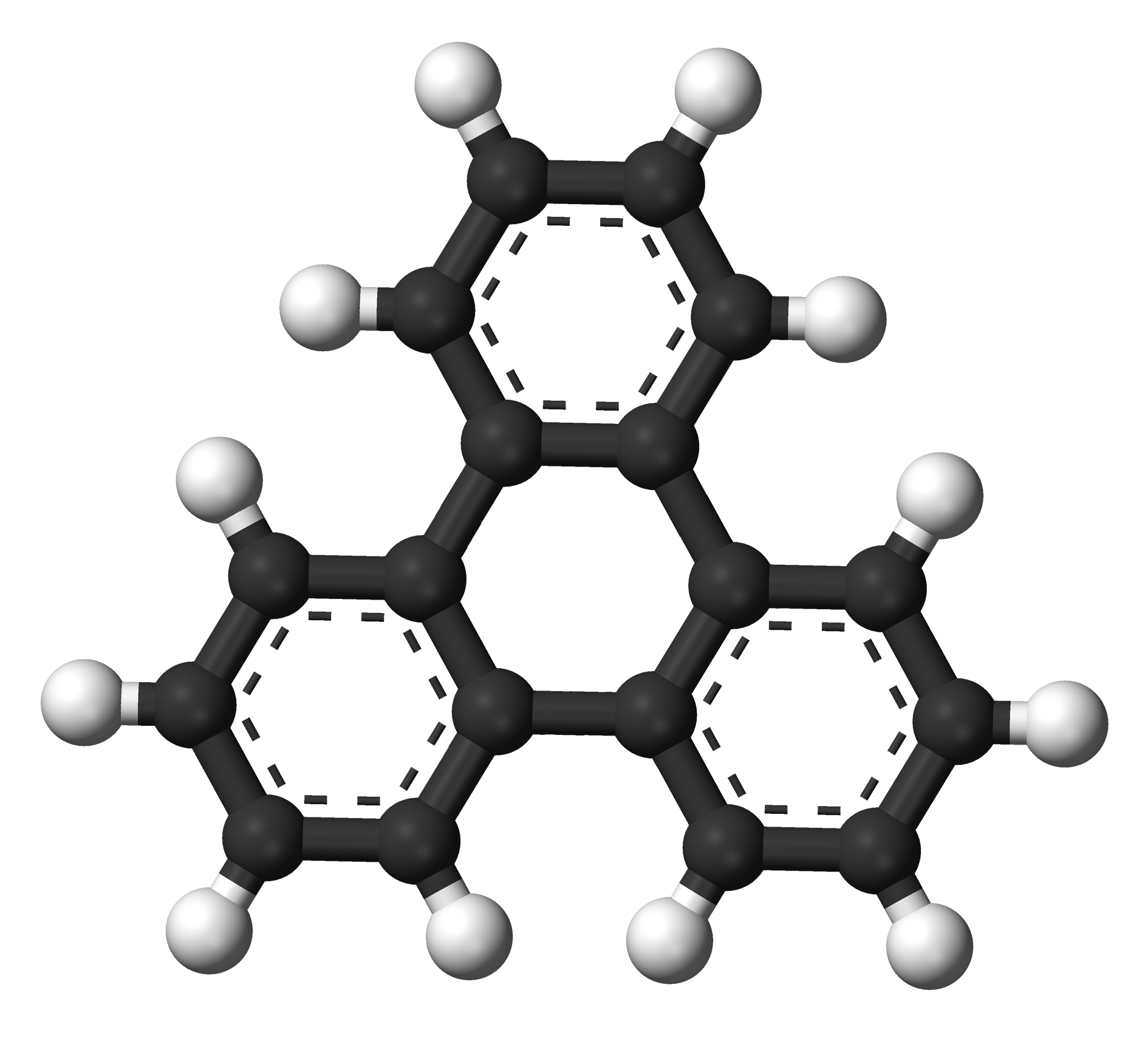

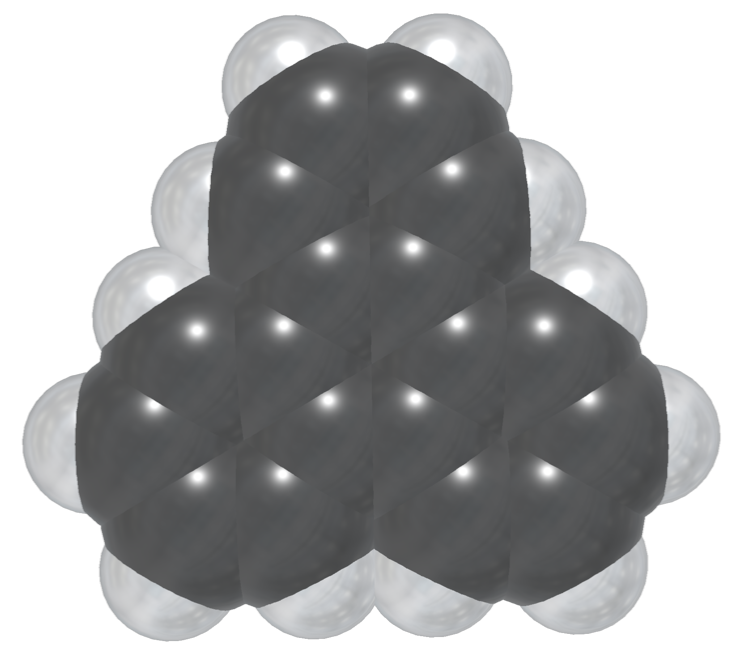

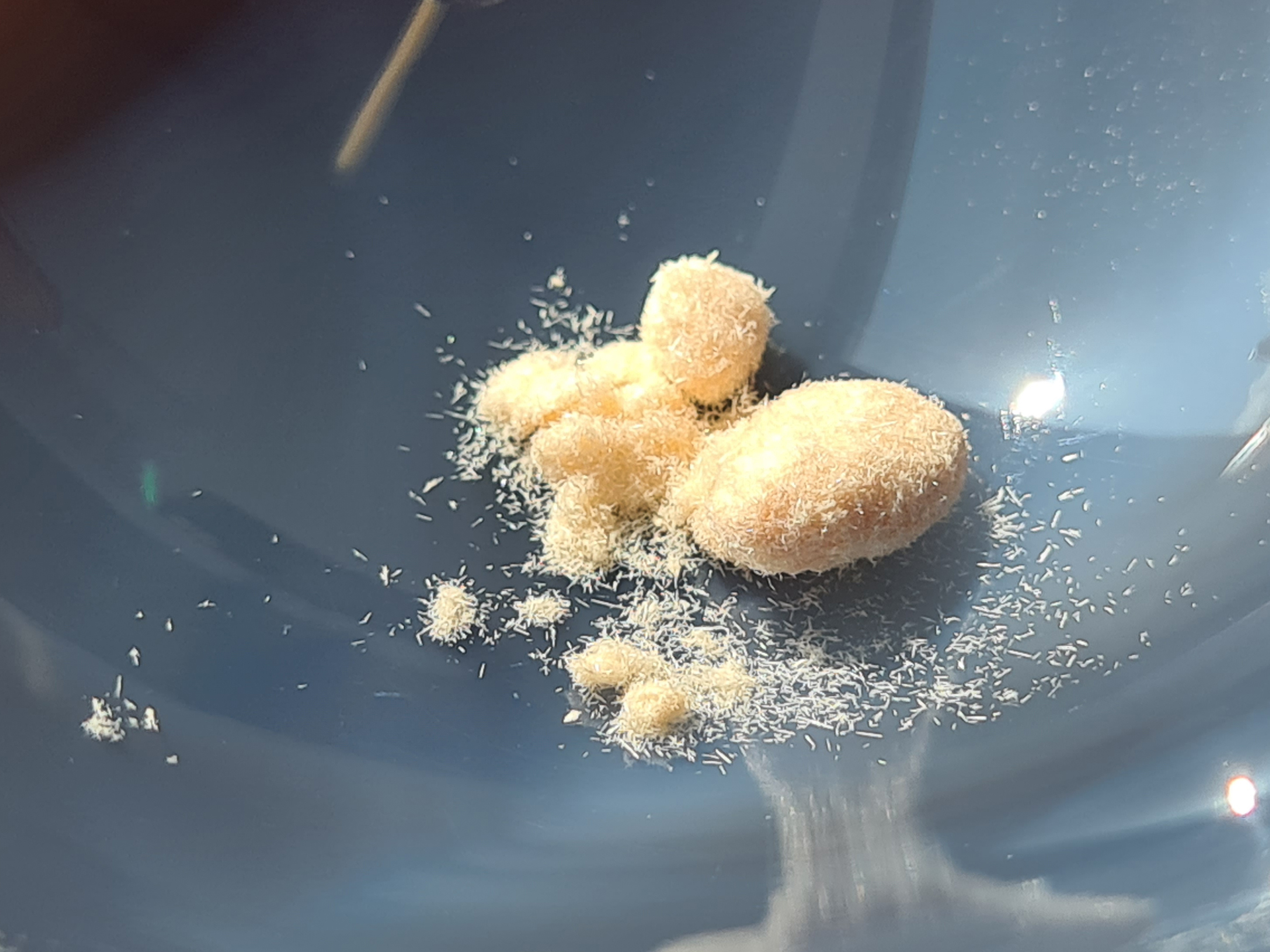

Names
- Preferred IUPAC name Triphenylene
- Other names Benzo[l]phenanthrene; 9,10-Benzophenanthrene; 1,2,3,4-Dibenzonaphthalene; Isochrysene

Identifiers
CAS Number	217-59-4
3D model (JSmol)	Interactive image
ChEBI	CHEBI:33080
ChEMBL	ChEMBL1797416
ChemSpider	8816
ECHA InfoCard	100.005.385
EC Number	205-922-9
KEGG	C19541
MeSH	C009590
PubChem CID	9170
UNII	18WX3373I0
CompTox Dashboard (EPA)	DTXSID9059757
- InChI: InChI=1S/C18H12/c1-2-8-14-13(7-1)15-9-3-4-11-17(15)18-12-6-5-10-16(14)18/h1-12H Key: SLGBZMMZGDRARJ-UHFFFAOYSA-N; InChI=1/C18H12/c1-2-8-14-13(7-1)15-9-3-4-11-17(15)18-12-6-5-10-16(14)18/h1-12H
- SMILES: c1(cccc3)c3c(cccc4)c4c2c1cccc2

Properties
Chemical formula	C_{18}H_{12}
Molar mass	228.294 g·mol^{−1}
Appearance	white solid
Density	1.308 g/cm^{3}
Melting point	198 °C; 388 °F; 471 K
Boiling point	438 °C; 820 °F; 711 K
Magnetic susceptibility (χ)	−156.6·10^{−6} cm^{3}/mol

Related compounds
Related tetracyclic PAHs	Pyrene; Chrysene; Benz(a)anthracene; Benzo(c)phenanthrene; Tricyclobutabenzene
Related compounds	Benzene; Coronene; Phenanthrene; Diphenylene; Tetraphenylene; Trinaphthylene; Triptycene; ortho-Terphenyl
- Except where otherwise noted, data are given for materials in their standard state (at 25 °C [77 °F], 100 kPa). verify (what is ?) Infobox references

Triphenylene is an organic compound with the formula (C_{6}H_{4})_{3}. It is a flat polycyclic aromatic hydrocarbon (PAH) that has a highly symmetric and planar structure consists of four fused benzene rings. Triphenylene has delocalized 18-π-electron systems based on a planar structure, corresponding to the symmetry group D_{3h}. It is more resonance-stable than its isomers chrysene, benz[a]anthracene, benzo[c]phenanthrene, and tetracene, hence resists hydrogenation. It is a light yellow powder, insoluble in water.

Triphenylene serves as a fundamental building block in discotic liquid crystals, where its planar, disc-like structure facilitates the formation of columnar mesophases, enabling applications in organic electronics. It is also used as a base for covalent and metal–organic frameworks.

== Discovery and first synthesis ==
Triphenylene was first separated by German chemists H. Schmidt and Gustav Schultz in 1880 from the products of the thermal decomposition of benzene vapor. Though triphenylene was previously referred to as chrysene, Schmidt and Schultz realized that it is an isomer of chrysene, and successfully identified and named it as triphenylene.

Later in 1907, Carl Mannich first synthesized triphenylene through a two-step reaction from cyclohexanone and confirmed its planar structure. Through trimerization of cyclohexanone in an aldol reaction, he obtained dodecahydrotriphenylene (C_{18}H_{24}) in low yield.

3 C_{6}H_{10}O → C_{18}H_{24} + 3 H_{2}O

Mannich then dehydrogenated dodecahydrotriphenylene into triphenylene with two methods: zinc dust distillation and copper-catalyzed dehydrogenation. He confirmed the product was identical to the pyrolysis product from benzene by reproducing Schmidt and Schultz's experiment and comparing the samples. Mannich also characterized triphenylene's properties, derivatives, and oxidation reactions, and confirmed it as a fully aromatic polycyclic hydrocarbon.

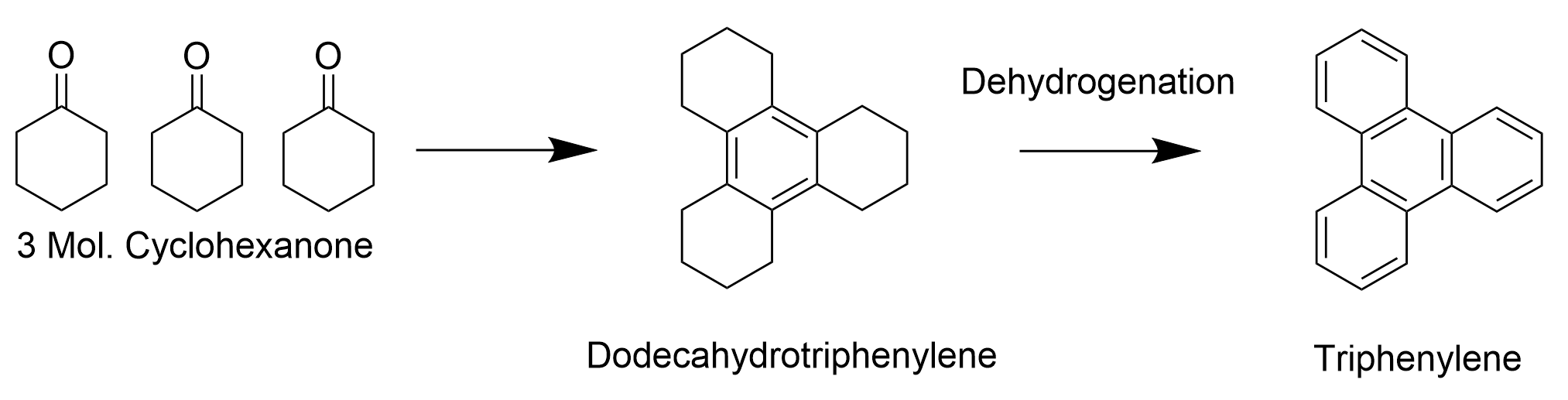
Mannich's synthesis of triphenylene

== Preparation ==
Triphenylene can be isolated from coal tar. It can also be synthesized in various ways.

One method is trimerization of benzyne. This pathway first diazotizes and iodinates o-bromoaniline through HCl, NaNO_{2}, and KI to produce o-bromoiodobenzene with a yield of 72-83%. Then form o-bromophenyl lithium using Li and ether. Add benzene to the organolithium intermediate to get triphenylene with a yield of 53-59%. Impurities of biphenyl are then removed with steam distillation.

o-bromo-aniline
HNO_{2}
KI
o-bromo-iodobenzene
2 Li
Et_{2}O
o-bromo-
phenyllithium
LiBr
benzyne
x3
triphenylene

Another method involves trapping benzyne with a biphenyl derivative. This method started with removing the trimethylsilyl group from 2-(trimethylsilyl)phenyl trifluoromethanesulfonate using cesium fluoride, generating benzyne. Benzyne then reacts with 2-bromobiphenyl in the presence of Pd(dba)_{2} and tri(o-tolyl)phosphine as catalysts and produces triphenylene with a yield of 76%.

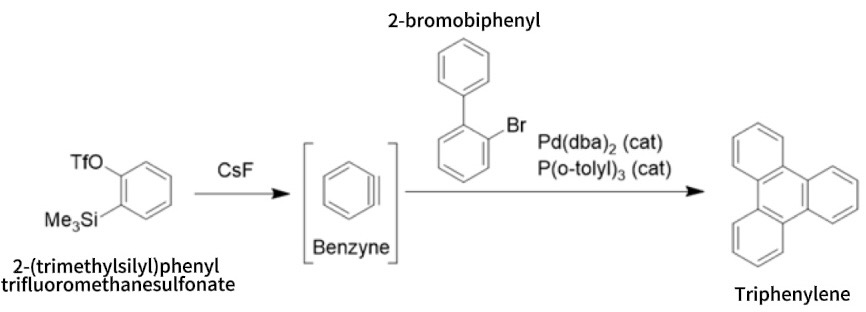
Synthesis of triphenylene via the palladium-catalyzed annulation of benzyne

== Application ==
=== Discotic liquid crystal and organic electronics ===
Triphenylene and its derivatives have been widely used in discotic liquid crystal and organic electronics as the core moiety due to its robust discotic molecular architecture.

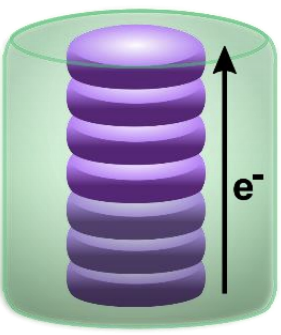
Stacking of triphenylene derivatives creates conducting channels

Due to its planar structure and π-conjugated system, triphenylene has a rigid discotic structure. This enables it to self-assemble and form highly ordered, long, cylindrical columns. The columnar mesophases provide a direct pathway for charge carriers(electrons or holes) and avoid interruption from scattering and trapped effects in disordered materials. This leads to efficient charge transport along the stacking direction. Tripenylene derivatives, with flexible aliphatic side chains, can modulate intermolecular interactions. This maintains molecular mobility under a wide temperature range and avoids excessive crystallization, and corresponding bad processability and solubility. Triphenylene derivatives also can be synthesized through well-established routes like the Suzuki–Miyaura cross-coupling reaction. Its functional groups can be introduced easily and used to adjust its properties.

Recent studies synthesized new polymer structures incorporating triphenylene units and found that these materials exhibit high photoluminescence and electroluminescence efficiencies. Their emission spectra are well-suited for blue light applications, demonstrating stability and promising performance for next-generation blue emitters.

=== Metal-organic frameworks and covalent organic frameworks ===
Due to its delocalized system, rigid structure, stability, and adjustable structures, triphenylene can be used in the synthesis of metal–organic frameworks (MOFs) and covalent organic frameworks (COFs). Similar to the properties mentioned in DLC applications, triphenylene and its derivatives have high conductivity, and further affect the conductivity of MOFs and COFs. HATP-based 2D MOFs Ni_{3}(HITP)_{2} single crystals can reach conductivities as high as 150 S/cm at 0K.

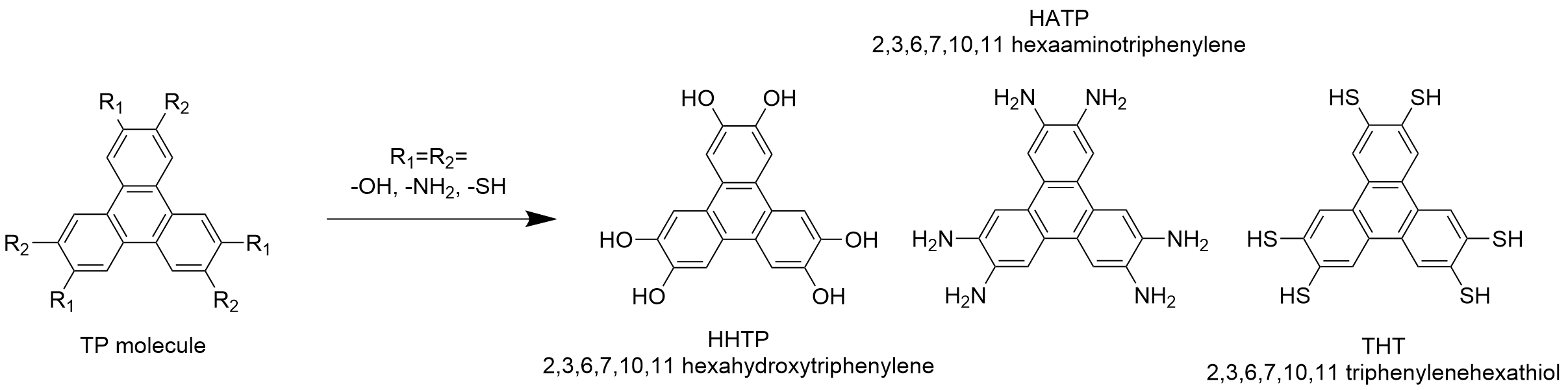
Chemical structure of a TP molecule

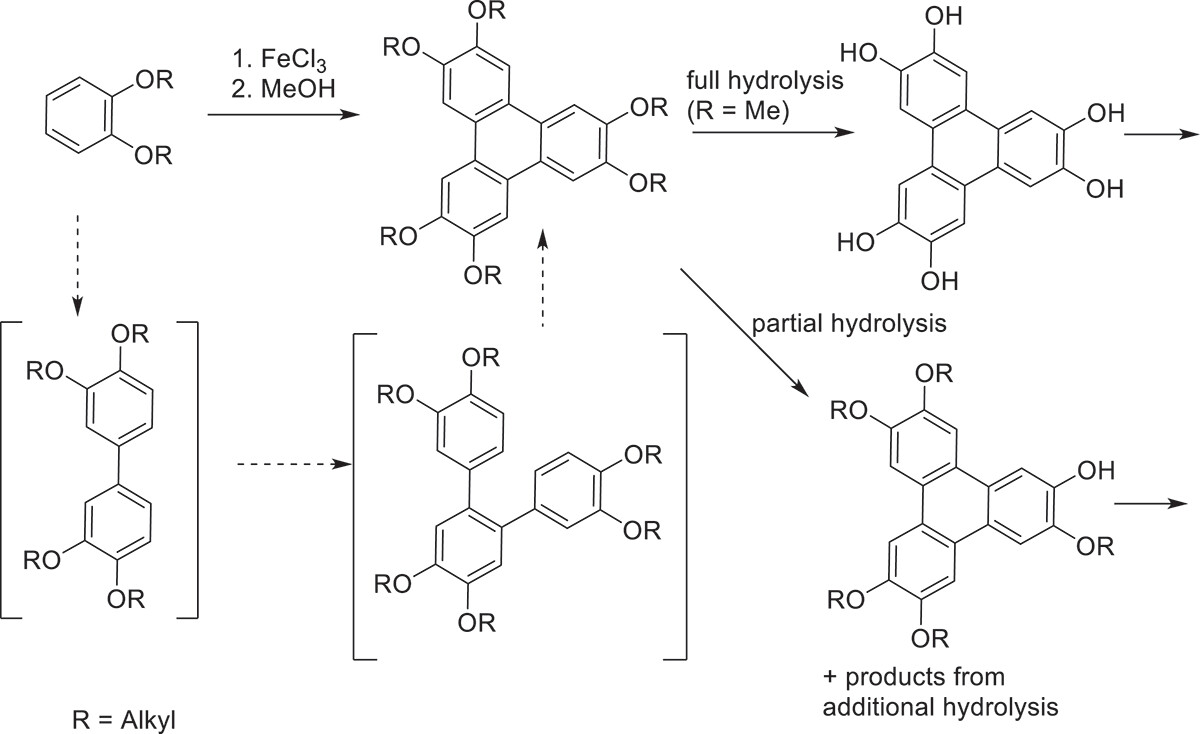
Synthesis of triphenylene derivatives hexaalkoxytriphenylenes(HAT)

The rigid planar structure and three-fold symmetry of triphenylene also make it suitable for honeycomb-like 2D layered materials. This enables supramolecular interlayer aggregation of TP-based MOFs and COFs and increases the stability and conductivity of the structure. It will also create uniform nanopores, which lead to high porosity and facilitate gas storage, molecular sieving, and ion exchange.

Multiple substitution sites of triphenylene bring multifunctionality to TP-base MOFs and COFs. Depending on the different functional groups, the physical and chemical properties of frameworks can be modified easily. In addition, due to the high chemical stability of triphenylene, it is adaptable to various synthesis methods like solvothermal synthesis, layer-by-layer assembly, microfluidic synthesis, interfacial synthesis, etc.

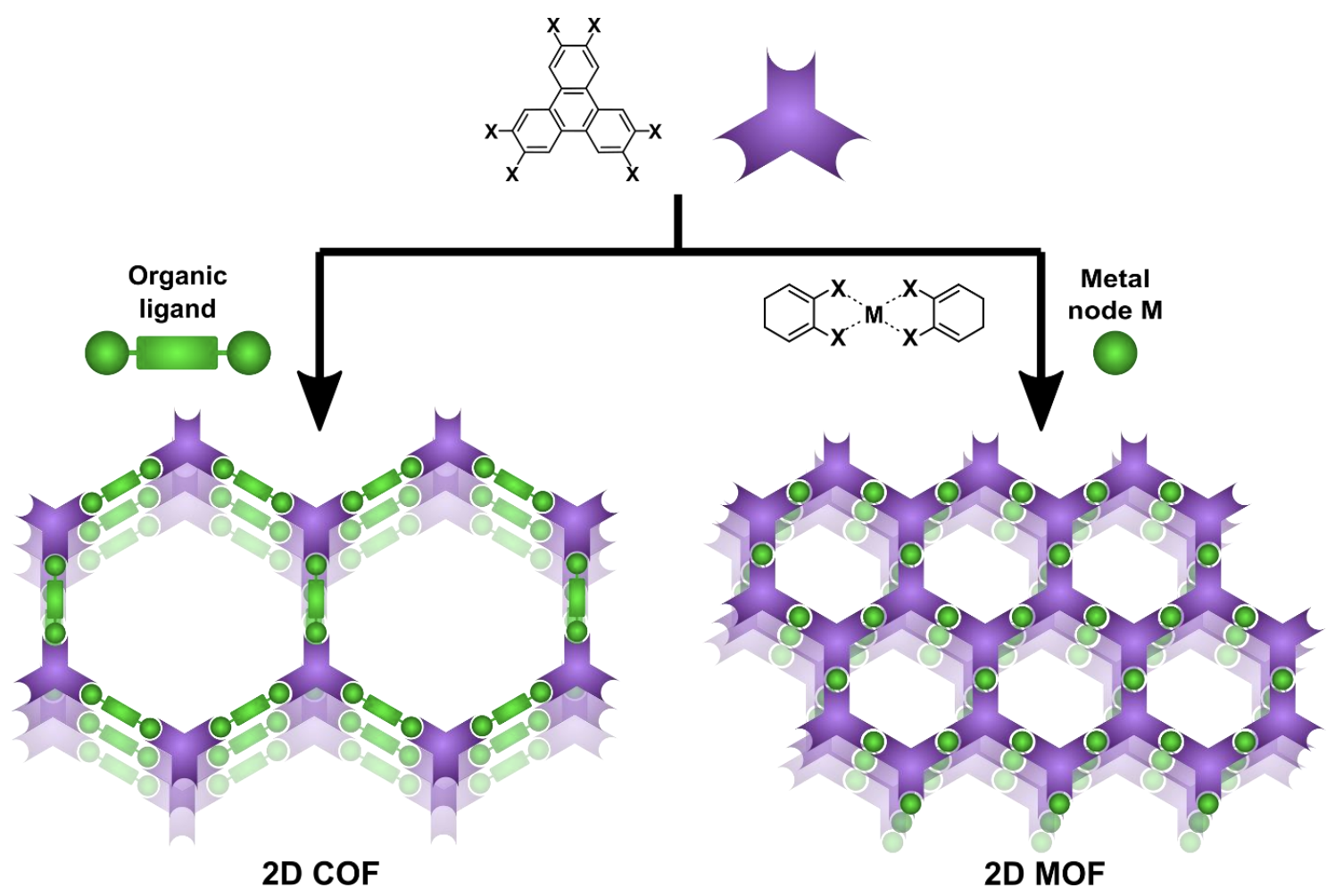
Formation scheme of TP-based 2D MOFs and TP-based 2D COFs

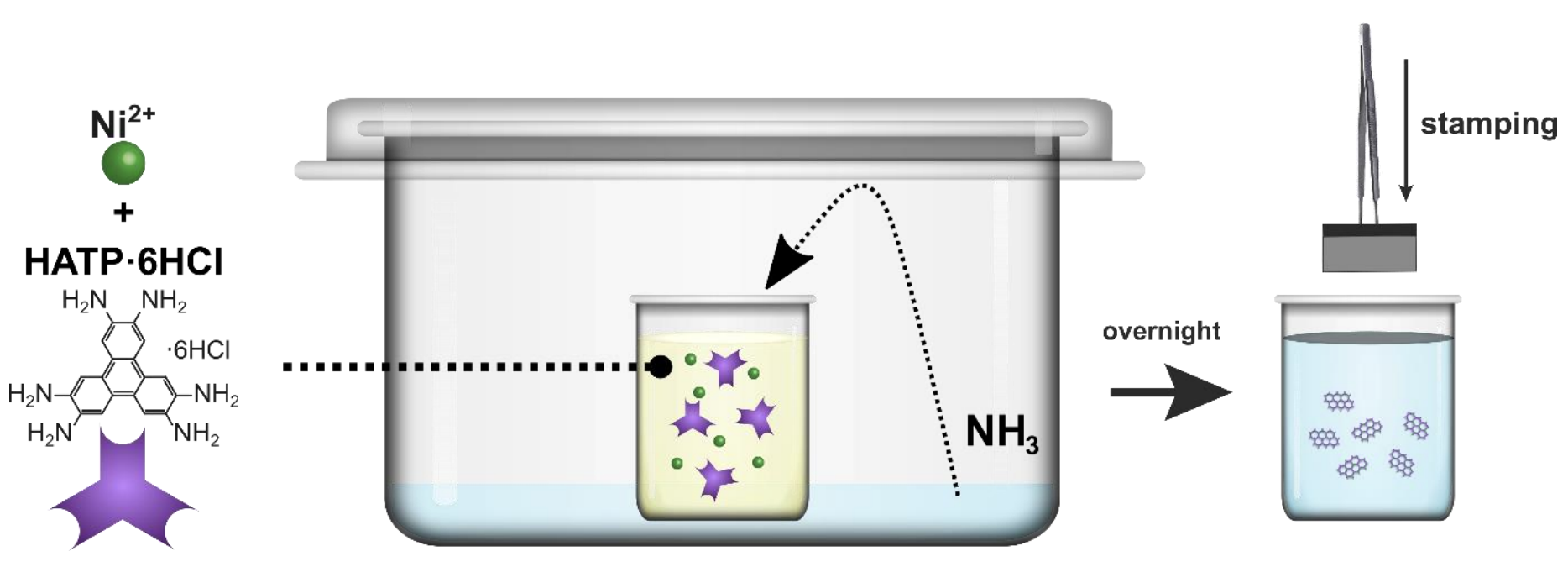
Synthesis of Ni_{3}(HITP)_{2} thin films through ammonia diffusion
