= Vidya Shankar =

Indian musicologist and educationist

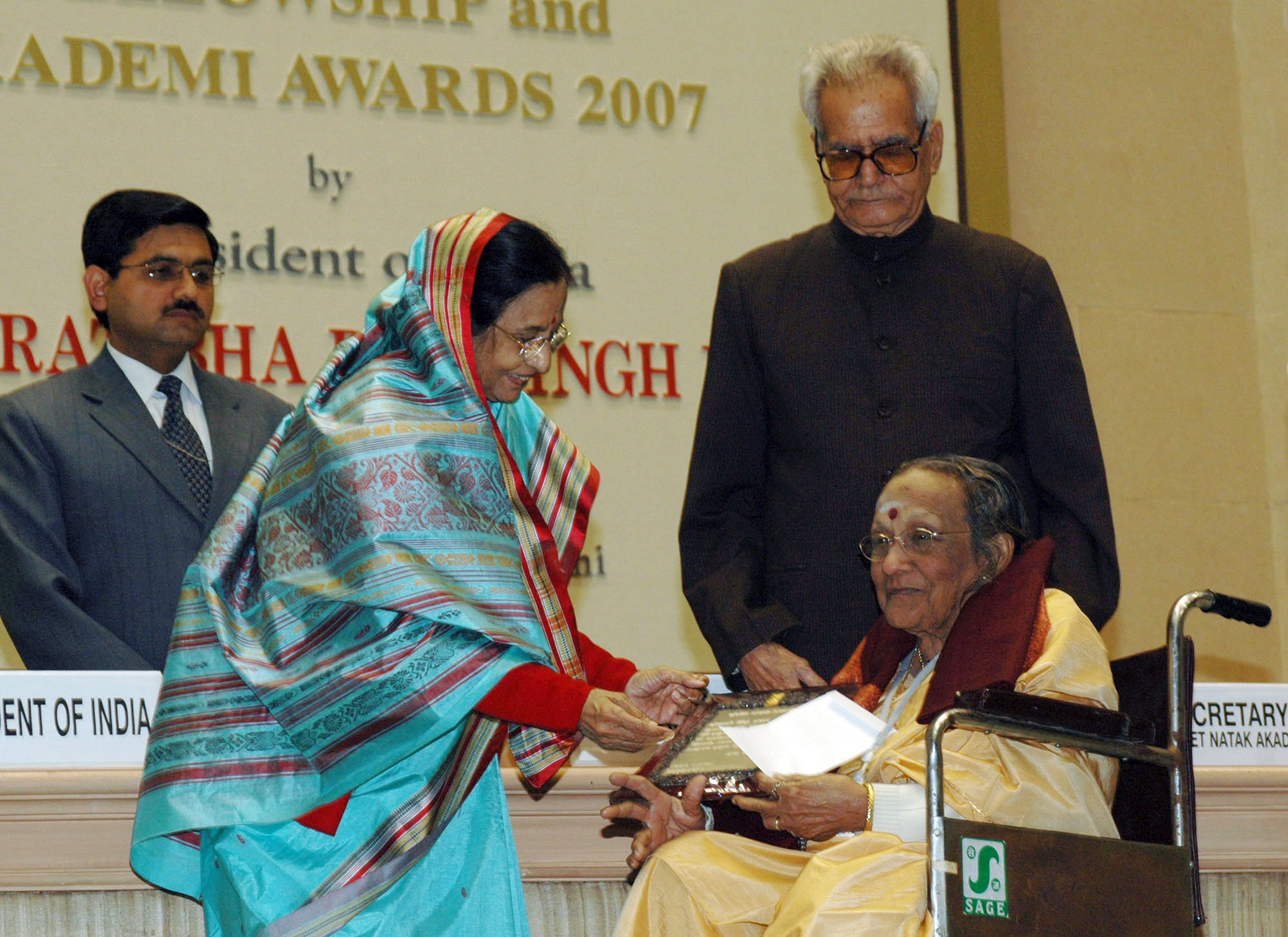
- President Pratibha Patil awarding Vidya Shankar the 2007 Sangeet Natak Akademi Award (Carnatic Instrumental - Veena)

Background information
- Born: 28 December 1919; Madras, Madras Presidency, British India (now Chennai, Tamil Nadu, India)
- Died: 29 June 2010 (aged 90); Mylapore, Chennai, Tamil Nadu, India
- Genres: Carnatic music

Vidya Shankar (28 December 1919—29 June 2010) was a distinguished Indian musicologist, educationist and vainika (veena musician). She was a recipient of the Sangeet Natak Akademi Award, the highest Indian award for practising artists.

== Career ==
As a child, Shankar was homeschooled until high school. Although proficient in mathematics, her favourite subject, and intended to pursue a degree in the field, but was overruled by her father, who felt it "too strenuous a subject in college for a girl. He made me take up music instead." After completing a teacher's training course, she did however teach mathematics at Kala Nilayam, the Children's Garden School and at the Kalakshetra Foundation in Chennai, later teaching Sanskrit and musicology at the Central College of Carnatic Music.

Shankar received her early musical education under T. S. Sabesa Iyer, receiving her advanced training under Madras Sabapathi Iyer and musicologist T. L. Venkatarama Iyer. Owing to her proficiency in Sanskrit and English, she became an authority on the great Carnatic musician Shyama Shastri, publishing numerous articles and books. In 2007, she was conferred with the Sangeet Natak Akademi Award.

== Personal life ==
A member of the distinguished Chandrasekhar family of intellectuals, Shankar was a younger sister of physics Nobel laureate Subramanyam Chandrashekhar and the niece of physics Nobel laureate C. V. Raman. She was married to V. S. Iyer, an executive with Parry & Co. The couple had three sons, V. S. Shivakumar, V. S. Mahesh and Dr. V. S. Sundar, who survived her.

Shankar died at her Mylapore residence in the morning of 29 June 2010, after a brief illness.
