= Rajaram Nityananda =

Indian physicist (born 1948)

- Born: 1948 (age 77–78)
- Education: University of Madras; IIT Madras; Bangalore University
- Scientific career
- Fields: Physics
- Workplaces: National Centre for Radio Astrophysics; Raman Research Institute
- Doctoral advisor: S. Ramaseshan
- Doctoral students: S. Bharadwaj

Rajaram Nityananda (born 1948) is an Indian physicist who works on solid-state physics, liquid crystals, astronomical optics, image processing, and gravitational dynamics. He currently works as a professor at Azim Premji University Bengaluru. He was formerly the director of the National Centre for Radio Astrophysics and also Tata Institute of Fundamental Research (TIFR) Centre for Interdisciplinary Sciences in Hyderabad. He served on the physical sciences jury for the Infosys Prize from 2015 to 2017. He also serves as an associate editor of the Journal of Astrophysics & Astronomy, published by the Indian Academy of Sciences. He also serves as the chief editor for Resonance Journal for Science Education published by the Indian Academy of Sciences. He is also the chairman of the board of directors of the National Institute of Technology, Tiruchirappalli, and Chennai Mathematical Institute. He is currently serving as a faculty member at the Indian Institute of Science Education and Research, Pune. Previously he worked at the Raman Research Institute from 1975 to 2000.
