= Mesogen =

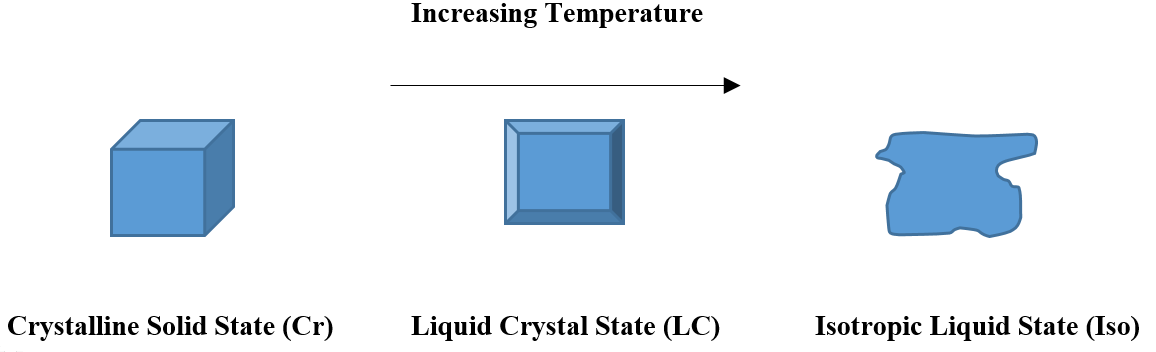
Mesophase.

A mesogen is a compound that displays liquid crystal properties. Mesogens can be described as disordered solids or ordered liquids because they arise from a unique state of matter that exhibits both solid- and liquid-like properties called the liquid crystalline state. This liquid crystalline state (LC) is called the mesophase and occurs between the crystalline solid (Cr) state and the isotropic liquid (Iso) state at distinct temperature ranges.

The liquid crystal properties arise because mesogenic compounds are composed of rigid and flexible parts, which help characterize the order and mobility of its structure. The rigid components align mesogen moieties in one direction and have distinctive shapes that are typically found in the form of rod or disk shapes. The flexible segments provide mesogens with mobility because they are usually made up of alkyl chains, which hinder crystallization to a certain degree. The combination of rigid and flexible chains induce structural alignment and fluidity between liquid crystal moieties.

In doing so, varying degrees of order and mobility within mesogens results in different types of liquid crystal phases, Figure 1. The nematic phase (N) is the least ordered and most fluid liquid crystalline state or mesophase that is based on the rigid core of mesogen moieties. The nematic phase leads to long range orientational order and short range positional order of mesogens. The smectic (Sm) and columnar (Col) phases are more ordered and less fluid than their nematic phases and demonstrate long range orientational order of rod-shaped and disk-shaped rigid cores, respectively.

== Examples ==
Figure 1 – Organization of rod-like and disk-like rigid cores in liquid crystal phases of mesogens, where Iso is the isotropic liquid state; N is the nematic phase of the liquid crystal state; SmA is the smectic A phase; SmC is the smectic C phase; and Col is the columnar phase.

Thermotropic mesogens are liquid crystals that are induced by temperature and there are two classical types, which include discotic mesogens and calamitic mesogens.

Discotic mesogens contain a disk-shaped rigid core and tend to organize in columns, forming columnar liquid crystal phases (Col) of long range positional order.

An example of a discotic mesogen type rigid core is a triphenylene based disk molecule, where the hexagonal columnar liquid crystal phase exists between 66 °C (crystal) and 122 °C (isotropic liquid phase).

Calamitic mesogens contain a rod-shaped rigid core and tend to organize in distinctive layers, forming lamellar or smectic liquid crystal phases (Sm) of long range positional order. Low-order smectic phases include smectic A (SmA) and smectic C (SmC) phases, while higher ordered smectic phases include smectic B, I, F, G and H (SmB/I/F/G/H) phases.

An example of a calamitic mesogen type rigid core is a benzyl cyanide based rod molecule, where the smectic A liquid crystal phase exists between the 60 °C (crystal) and 62 °C (isotropic liquid phase) temperature range.

Bent-rod mesogens are special calamitic mesogens that contain a nonlinear rod-shaped or bent- rod shaped rigid core and organize to form "banana-phases". The rigid units of these phases pack in a way so that the highest density and polar order are achieved, typically with the apex of the bent rod pointing in one direction. When a layer of bent-rods points in the same polar direction as its adjacent layers the lamellar organization is known as the smectic PF (SmPF) phase, where the F subscript indicates ferroelectric switching. Smectic PA (SmPA) is the term given to a layer of bent-rods that points in the opposite polar direction as its neighbouring layers, where A stands for antiferroelectic switching.

Other variations of bent-rod liquid crystal phases include: antiferroelectric/ferroelectric smectic C (SmCPA/SmCPF) phases and antiferroelectric/ferroelectric smectic A (SmAPA/SmAPF) phases, which have distinctive tilt and orthogonal modes of lamellar organization.

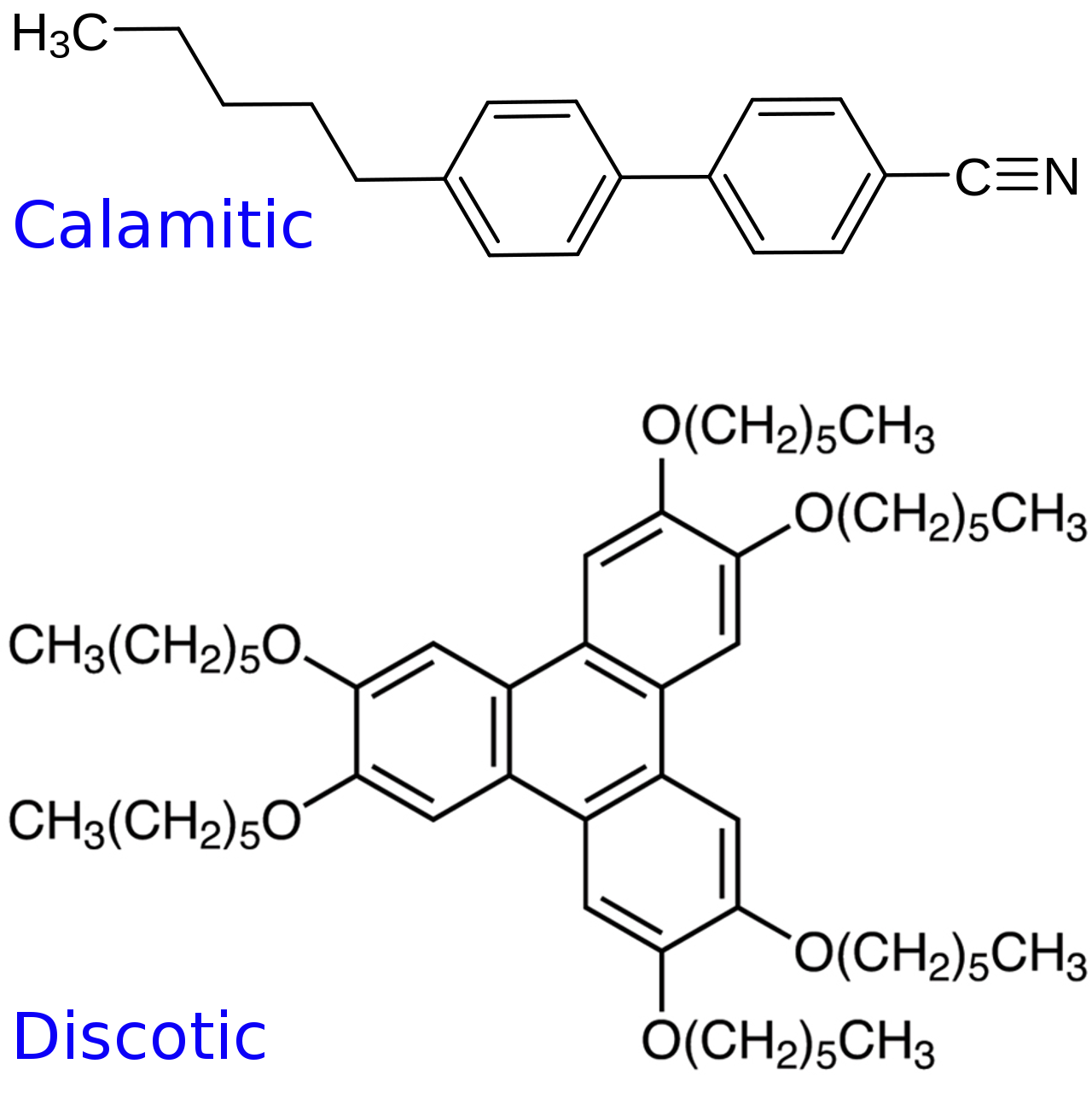
Calamitic and discotic mesogens based on benzyl cyanide and triphenylene, respectively.

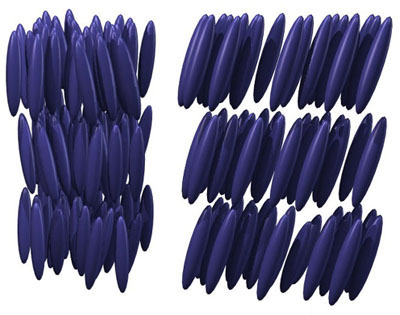
Lamellar (layer) organization of low order calamitic mesogens. The smectic A phase (left) has molecules organized into layers. In the smectic C phase (right), the molecules are tilted inside the layers

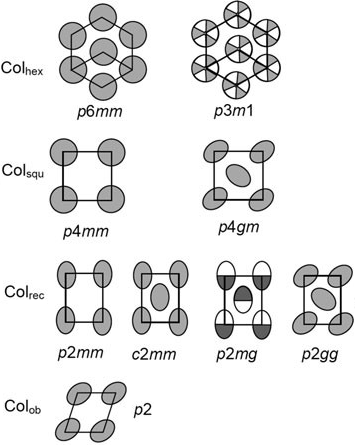
2D lattices of columnar mesogens; Col_{hex}, Col_{squ}, Col_{rec} and Col_{ob} stand for hexagonal, square, rectangular and oblique.
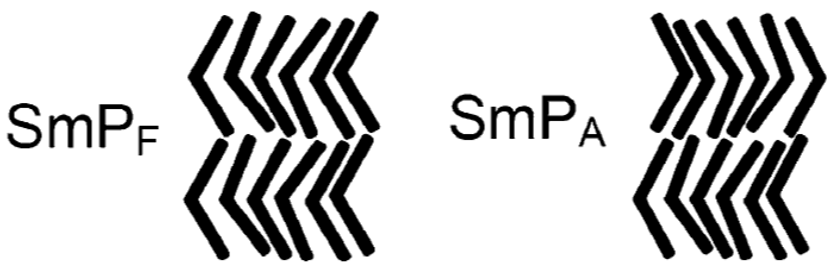
Lamellar (layer) organization of bent-rod calamitic mesogens, including the smectic PF and PA phases

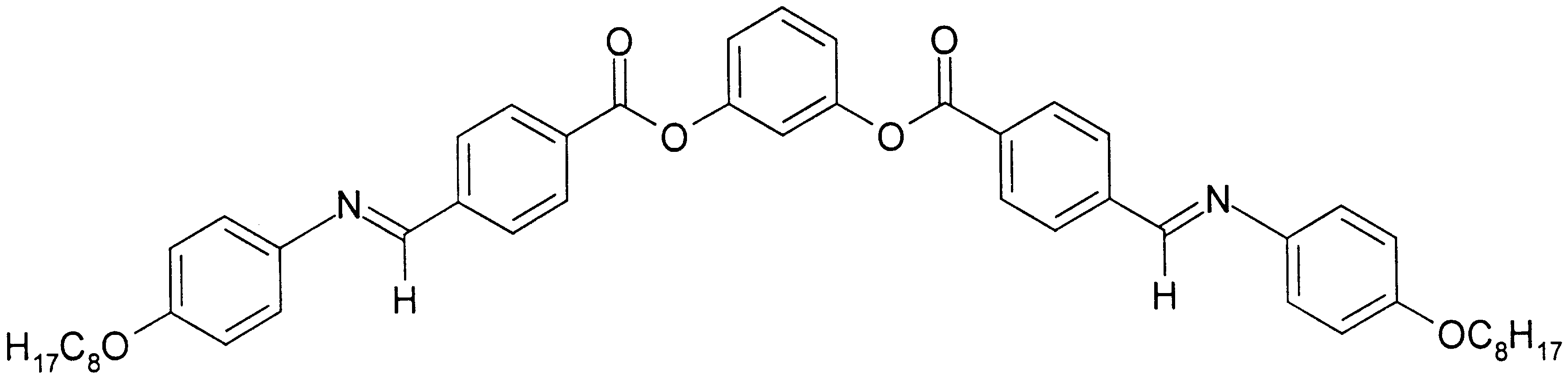
A bent-rod (calamitic) mesogen, where the antiferroelectric smectic C phase exists between 145 °C (crystal) and 162 °C (isotropic liquid).
