= Columnar phase =

The columnar phase is a class of mesophases in which molecules assemble into cylindrical structures to act as mesogens. Originally, these kinds of liquid crystals were called discotic liquid crystals or bowlic liquid crystals because the columnar structures are composed of flat-shaped discotic or bowl-shaped molecules stacked one-dimensionally. Since recent findings provide a number of columnar liquid crystals consisting of non-discoid mesogens, it is more common now to classify this state of matter and compounds with these properties as columnar liquid crystals.

Takuzo Aida and co-workers recently reported cyclic peptides that self-assemble into polar columnar organizations. These materials can be unidirectionally aligned over large areas by application of an external electric field.

== Classes ==
Columnar liquid crystals are grouped by their structural order and the ways of packing of the columns. Nematic columnar liquid crystals have no long-range order and are less organized than other columnar liquid crystals. Other columnar phases with long-range order are classified by their two-dimensional lattices: hexagonal, tetragonal, rectangular, and oblique phases.

The discotic nematic phase includes nematic liquid crystals composed of flat-shaped discotic molecules without long-range order. In this phase, molecules do not form specific columnar assemblies but only float with their short axes in parallel to the director (a unit vector which defines the liquid-crystalline alignment and order).

== Current topics of interest ==
The first discotic liquid crystal was found in 1977 by the Indian researcher Sivaramakrishna Chandrasekhar. This molecule has one central benzene ring surrounded by six alkyl chains. Since then, a large number of discoid mesogenic compounds have been discovered in which triphenylene, porphyrin, phthalocyanine, coronene, and other aromatic molecules are involved. The typical columnar liquid-crystalline molecules have a pi-electron-rich aromatic core attached by flexible alkyl chains. This structure is attracting particular attention for potential molecular electronics in which aromatic parts transport electrons or holes and alkyl chains act as insulating parts. The advantages of liquid-crystalline conductors are their anisotropy, processibility, and self-healing characteristics for structural defects.
