= Venkatraman Radhakrishnan =

Indian space scientist (1929-2011)

V. Radhakrishnan
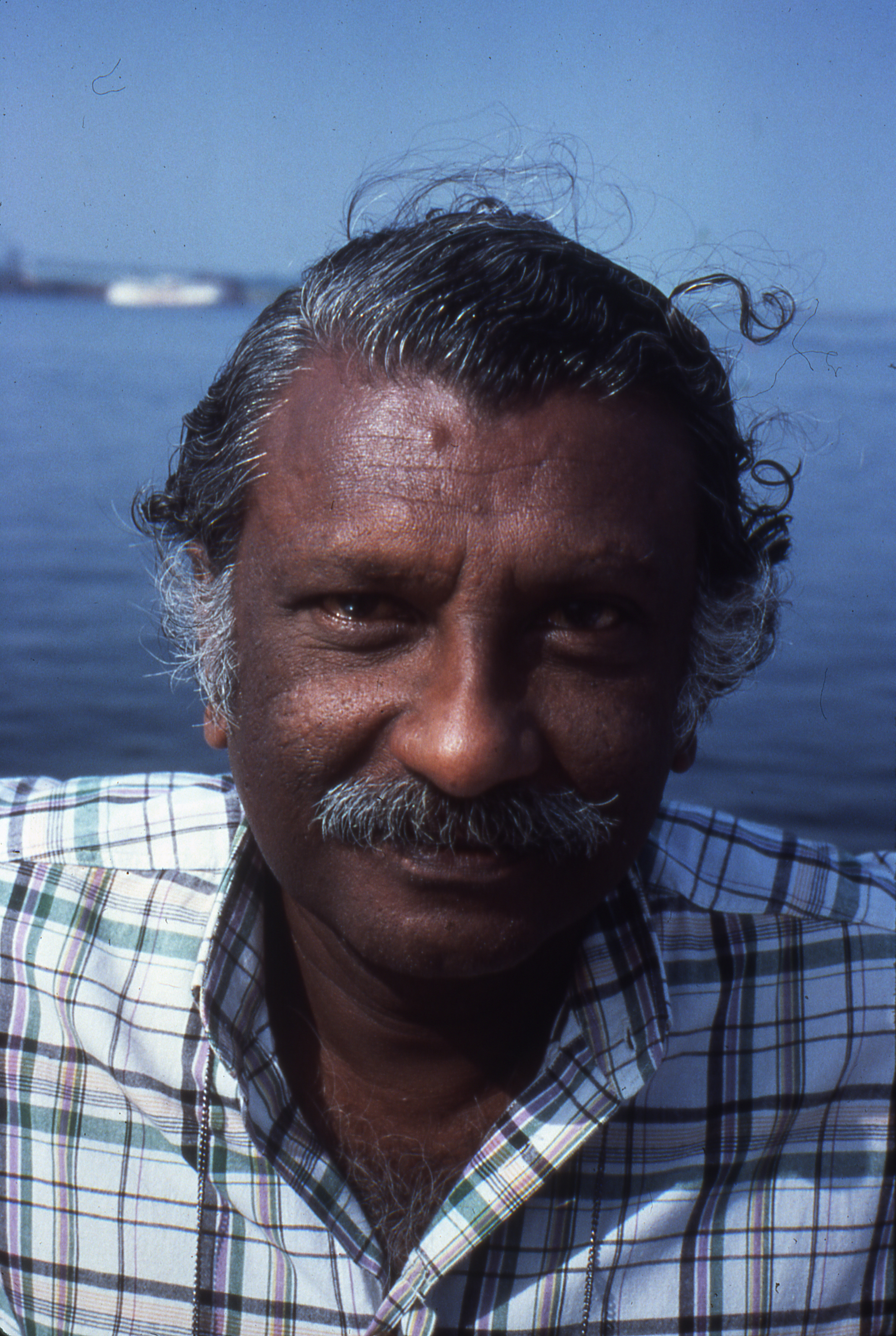
- Radhakrishnan in 1988
- Born: 18 May 1929; Madras, Madras Presidency, British India (now Chennai, Tamil Nadu, India)
- Died: 3 March 2011 (aged 81); Bangalore (now Bengaluru), Karnataka, India
- Education: Mysore University
- Spouse: Francoise-Dominique Barnard
- Father: C. V. Raman
- Scientific career
- Fields: Astronomy, astrophysics

Venkataraman Radhakrishnan (18 May 1929 – 3 March 2011) was an Indian space scientist and Royal Swedish Academy of Sciences member. He retired from his career as professor emeritus of the Raman Research Institute in Bangalore, India, of which he had previously been director from 1972 to 1994 and which is named after his father. He served on various committees in various capacities including as the vice-president of the International Astronomical Union during 1988–1994. He was also a Foreign Fellow of the Royal Swedish Academy of Sciences and the US National Academy of Sciences. He was an Associate of the Royal Astronomical Society and a Fellow of the Indian Academy of Sciences, Bangalore.

== Early life and education ==
Radhakrishnan was born in Tondiarpet, a suburb of Madras, to Nobel laureate physicist Chandrasekhara Venkata Raman and his wife Lokasundari Ammal. His early schooling was in Madras. He graduated from Mysore University before joining the Department of Physics at the Indian Institute of Science in Bangalore.

== Career ==
He worked at the Chalmers University of Technology in Gothenburg, Sweden as a Research Assistant during 1955–1958. He was a senior research fellow of the California Institute of Technology in USA before joining the Radiophysics Division of the Commonwealth Scientific and Industrial Research Organization, Sydney, Australia initially as the senior research scientist and later as the principal research scientist. He returned to India in 1972 and took up the task of rebuilding the Raman Research Institute as its director. During his tenure as the director of the Raman Research Institute between 1972–1994 he built an international reputation for work in the areas of pulsar astronomy, liquid crystals, and other areas of frontline research in astronomy. The University of Amsterdam conferred the Doctor Honoris Causa degree on Prof. Radhakrishnan in 1996.

Radhakrishnan served on various committees in various capacities. He was the vice-president of the International Astronomical Union during 1988–1994. He served as the chairman of Commission J ( Radio Astronomy) of the International Union of Radio Sciences (1981–1984). He was a member of the Foreign Advisory Committee for the Netherlands Foundation for Radio Astronomy, Steering Committee of the Australia Telescope National Facility, CSIRO, Australia, Advisory Committee for the Green Bank Radio Telescope, National Radio Astronomy Observatory, USA. He was also the Member of the Governing Council of the Physical Research Laboratory, Ahmedabad and the Scientific Advisory Committee of the Inter-University Centre for Astronomy and Astrophysics. During the period of 1973–1981 he was a member of the Indian National Committee for Astronomy.

Radhakrishnan was selected to various scientific bodies, both national and international. He was a Foreign Fellow of both the Royal Swedish Academy of Sciences and the US National Science Academy. He was an Associate of the Royal Astronomical Society and a Fellow of the Indian Academy of Sciences, Bangalore.

== Research ==
Radhakrishnan was associated with radio astronomy from the beginning of its post-World War II growth in the 1950s. He was one the founders of observational astronomy in India. He worked around the world throughout his career in various locations, such as Sweden in 1954, Caltech, CSIRO, Sydney, and Bangalore. The last 33 years of his career were spent in Bangalore.

Part of his research involved studying the polarisation of radio waves in astronomical objects. This included the detection of radio waves from the Van Allen like belts surrounding Jupiter and the first determination of the true rotation of the core of Jupiter. He was also the first to systematically apply interferometry to polarised brightness distributions and an early study of the Zeeman Effect in the 21 cm line emitted by a hydrogen atom. His measurements of polarisation of the Vela Pulsar aided in establishing the picture of a magnetised rotating neutron star and led him to propose the paradigm of curvature radiation from polar caps of neutron stars which has been a notable contribution to the study of pulsar emission mechanisms since that time.

The period of his stay in Australia also marked his leadership of an extensive survey of the absorption and emission of 21 cm line radiation by neutral hydrogen which later helped to develop a realistic model of the interstellar medium. He also carried out systematic interferometric study of 21 cm absorption towards a large number of galactic and extragalactic sources.

He also contributed in designing and fabricating hang-gliders, micro-light aircraft and sailboats. His original contributions in these fields were acknowledged by the Government of India by way of support from the Aeronautics Research Development Board, Ministry of Defence (for designing hang-gliders) and ISRO (for sailboats).

Radhakrishnan published more than 80 papers in research journals and also proceedings of different various International Conferences. Radhakrishnan also co-edited a book of conference-proceedings, "Supernovae: their Progenitors and Remnants" (1985). He was the chairman of the Editorial Board of the Journal of Astrophysics and Astronomy from 1982 to 1987.

Radhakrishnan worked in the Raman Research Institute. He was involved in the construction of the 10.4 meter millimetre wave radio antenna at the Institute which has been used to study various astrophysical phenomena producing original contributions in pulsar astronomy as well as recombination line studies of the interstellar medium.

He made contributions to the study of Deuterium abundance in the galaxy, Astrophysical Raman Masers, OH emission from clouds, and construction of low frequency telescopes at Gauribidanur and Mauritius.

He delivered the Milne Lecture in Oxford in 1987, and Jansky Lecture in 2000.

He was the member of International Astronomical Union (IAU) and served on some of its committees including Division VI Commission 34 on Interstellar Matter, Division X Commission 40 on Radio Astronomy, Division XI Commission 44 Space & High Energy Astrophysics, Division VI Interstellar Matter, Division X Radio Astronomy, and Division IX Space & High Energy Astrophysics.

== Personal life ==
Radhakrishnan married Francoise-Dominique Barnard. They have a son, Vivek Radhakrishnan.

== Awards ==
V. Radhakrishnan received numerous awards, some of which are listed below.

- M. P. Birla Memorial Award (2005)

== See also ==
- Chandrasekhar family
