= S. Ramaseshan =

Indian scientist

Sivaraj Ramaseshan
- Born: 10 October 1923; Madras, Madras Presidency, British India (now Chennai, Tamil Nadu, India)
- Died: 29 December 2003 (aged 80); Bangalore (now Bengaluru), Karnataka, India
- Parents: Sivaramakrishnan (father); Sitalaxmi (mother)
- Relatives: C.V. Raman (uncle); S. Pancharatnam (brother); Sivaramakrishna Chandrasekhar (brother)
- Awards: Padma Bhushan
- Scientific career
- Fields: Physics
- Workplaces: Indian Institute of Science; Indian Institute of Technology
- Doctoral advisor: C.V. Raman
- Doctoral students: Rajaram Nityananda

Sivaraj Ramseshan (10 October 1923 – 29 December 2003) was an Indian scientist known for his work in the field of crystallography. Ramaseshan served as director of the Indian Institute of Science and was awarded the Padma Bhushan. Ramaseshan is the nephew of Indian scientist and Nobel laureate Sir C. V. Raman and cousin of Subramanyan Chandrasekhar.

== Early life ==
Ramaseshan was born in Madras on 10 October 1923, to Sitalaxmi (sister of C. V. Raman) and Sivaramakrishnan. He had his schooling in Nagpur and started his forays into science as a research student under his uncle, Sir C. V. Raman.

== Scientific career ==
On completion of his doctorate, Ramaseshan joined the Indian Institute of Science as a lecturer. During this time, he developed an interest in X-ray crystallography and was instrumental in improving the material science division in the National Aerospace Laboratories. Ramaseshan also taught as a professor in the Indian Institute of Technology.

== Positions held ==
In 1979, Ramaseshan was appointed joint-director of the Indian Institute of Science and in 1981 became its director. He served as the director of IISc from 1981 to 1984, as president of the Indian Academy of Sciences (1983–1985), and honorary distinguished professor emeritus at the Raman Research Institute (1984–2003).

== Awards ==
In 1966, Ramaseshan was awarded the Shanti Swarup Bhatnagar Award. This was followed by the Vasvik Award in 1980 and the INSA Aryabhata Medal in 1985. Ramaseshan is also a recipient of the Padma Bhushan.

== Publications ==
Ramaseshan co-authored a biography of his uncle, C. V. Raman, with Raman himself and also edited two collections of Raman's writings.

== Death ==
Ramaseshan died on 29 December 2003, weeks after his 80th birthday. He was survived by his wife, Kausalya, who was a great-granddaughter of V. S. Srinivasa Sastri, and by three daughters.
