= S. Pancharatnam =

Indian physicist

Shivaramakrishnan Pancharatnam
- Born: 9 February 1934; Calcutta, India
- Died: 28 May 1969 (aged 35); Oxford, England
- Education: Nagpur University; Raman Research Institute
- Known for: Geometric phase
- Parents: Sivaramakrishnan (father); Sitalaxmi (mother)
- Relatives: C.V. Raman (uncle); S. Ramaseshan (brother); Sivaramakrishna Chandrasekhar (brother)
- Scientific career
- Fields: Quantum optics, optics
- Workplaces: University of Mysore; Oxford University
- Doctoral advisor: C. V. Raman

Shivaramakrishnan Pancharatnam (9 February 1934 – 28 May 1969) was an Indian physicist who did significant work in the field of optics. He is noted for his discovery of a type of geometric phase sometimes known as Pancharatnam phase for polarized beams passing through crystals.

== Biography ==
He was born in Calcutta in West Bengal, India in 1934. His mother, Sitalaxmi, was C.V. Raman's sister, and his father Sivaramakrishnan worked in the Indian Accounts Service. He was elected a Fellow of the Indian Academy of Sciences at the early age of 25. He was a reader at the Department of studies in Physics, University of Mysore from 1961–1964. From 1964 until his death in 1969 at the age of 35 he was a Research Fellow of St Catherine's College, Oxford, working in association with George William Series. His publications for this period were mainly concerned with the theory of effects found in experiments on optical pumping, e.g. double refraction in a gas due to spin alignment. Professor Series has written an introduction to the life and work of Pancharatnam. He also prepared, for the Proceedings of the Royal Society, the last three papers from notes left by Pancharatnam.

In 1956, Pancharatnam was studying interference figures produced by light waves in crystal plates, under his advisor C. V. Raman, when he discovered the properties of what is now known as the geometric phase, and which predated Michael Berry's work on the topic from 1983.
