= Chidambara Chandrasekaran =

Indian demographer

Chidambara Chandrasekaran (1911–2000) was noted Indian demographer and statistician, was educated in India, UK and the US. He graduated from Morris College, Nagpur, with a B.Sc. degree, followed by a M.Sc. degree from the Nagpur University, and a PhD degree in statistics from University College London in 1938. He was also awarded an MPH degree from Johns Hopkins School of Hygiene and Public Health in 1947.

Note that in some publications his name is spelled as "Chandra Sekar".
He was related to two Nobel Prize winners: C. V. Raman was his uncle and Subrahmanyan Chandrasekhar was his cousin.

== Professional career ==
He worked for the United Nations and World Bank in various capacities. He was elected as the President of International Union for the Scientific Study of Population (IUSSP) and served in this position from 1969 to 1973.
He held academic position at various Indian universities. He was a professor of biostatistics at the All India Institute of Hygiene and Public Health, (then a part of the University of Calcutta), from 1941 to 1948 and 1954–8. This was followed by a stint as the director of the Demographic Training and Research Centre, Mumbai (later renamed as the International Institute for Population Sciences) from 1959 to 1964.

== Research ==
One of his most important contributions to the field of demography was in developing a technique to estimate the number of vital events by comparing results from two different systems (such as a sample survey and a vital registration system). This technique is commonly known as Chandra-Deming formula (also known as Dual Record System) and was first proposed in an article in 1949 "On a method of estimating birth and death rates and the extent of registration." Journal of the American Statistical Association, 44(245): 101-115 (co-authored with W. Edwards Deming). Various improvements and adaptations of this method are now commonly used in developing countries, including India, to estimate birth and death rates.

Chandrasekaran was the lead investigator of the Mysore Population Study, funded by the United Nations and the Indian Government, which was a pioneering survey in collecting fertility related information, including contraceptive use, in a developing country and in demonstrating that such data could be used for analyses of fertility determinants. He also investigated the population change of the Parsis in India and the reproduction patterns of Bengali women.

Chandrasekaran was active promoter of family planning policies in India and at least on one occasion advised Jawaharlal Nehru, former Prime minister of India, on matters of demographic transition.

== Sources ==
The Life and Works of a Demographer: An Autobiography. 1999. by Chidambara Chandrasekaran. New Delhi: Tata McGraw-Hill.
See also John C. Caldwell review of the book published in Population Studies, vol. 54 no. 3, pp. 354–5.
