= Eklavya University =

Private university in India

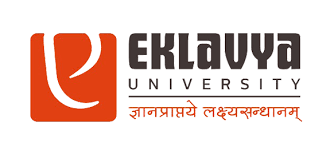
- Motto: Transform Lives and Communities Through Learning
- Type: Private University
- Established: 2020
- Affiliations: UGC
- Chancellor: Dr. Sudha Malaiya
- Vice-Chancellor: Prof. (Dr.) Pawan Kumar Jain
- Location: Near Toll Gate, Sagar Rd, Damoh, Madhya Pradesh 470661, Damoh, Madhya Pradesh, 470661, India; 23.806°N 79.373°E
- Campus: 28 acres (11 ha); Suburban
- Website: Official website

Eklavya University is a private university located in Damoh, Madhya Pradesh, India. It offers 12 faculties across diverse fields, and over 100 courses/combinations.

== Campus ==
- Campus: ~28 acres, green campus with hostels, cafeterias, labs, auditorium, sports, gym, swimming pool, medical facilities, library, Wi-Fi, transport, alumni network Careers360.
- Life@Eklavya: includes sports, arts & culture, health & wellness, community engagement, sustainability, student clubs & activities such as NCC/NSS.

== Faculties ==
- Agriculture
- Engineering
- Nursing & Paramedical
- Commerce
- Management
- Arts & Humanities
- Basic & Applied Sciences
- Education & Library Science
- Naturopathy & Yogic Sciences
- Journalism & Mass Communication
- Vocational Studies
- Design

== Affiliations and recognition ==
Recognized by UGC, MP Private University Regulatory Council; promoted by Ojaswini Samdarshi Nyas trust.
