= Sivaramakrishna Chandrasekhar =

Indian physicist (1930-2004)

Sivaramakrishna Chandrasekhar FNA, FRS
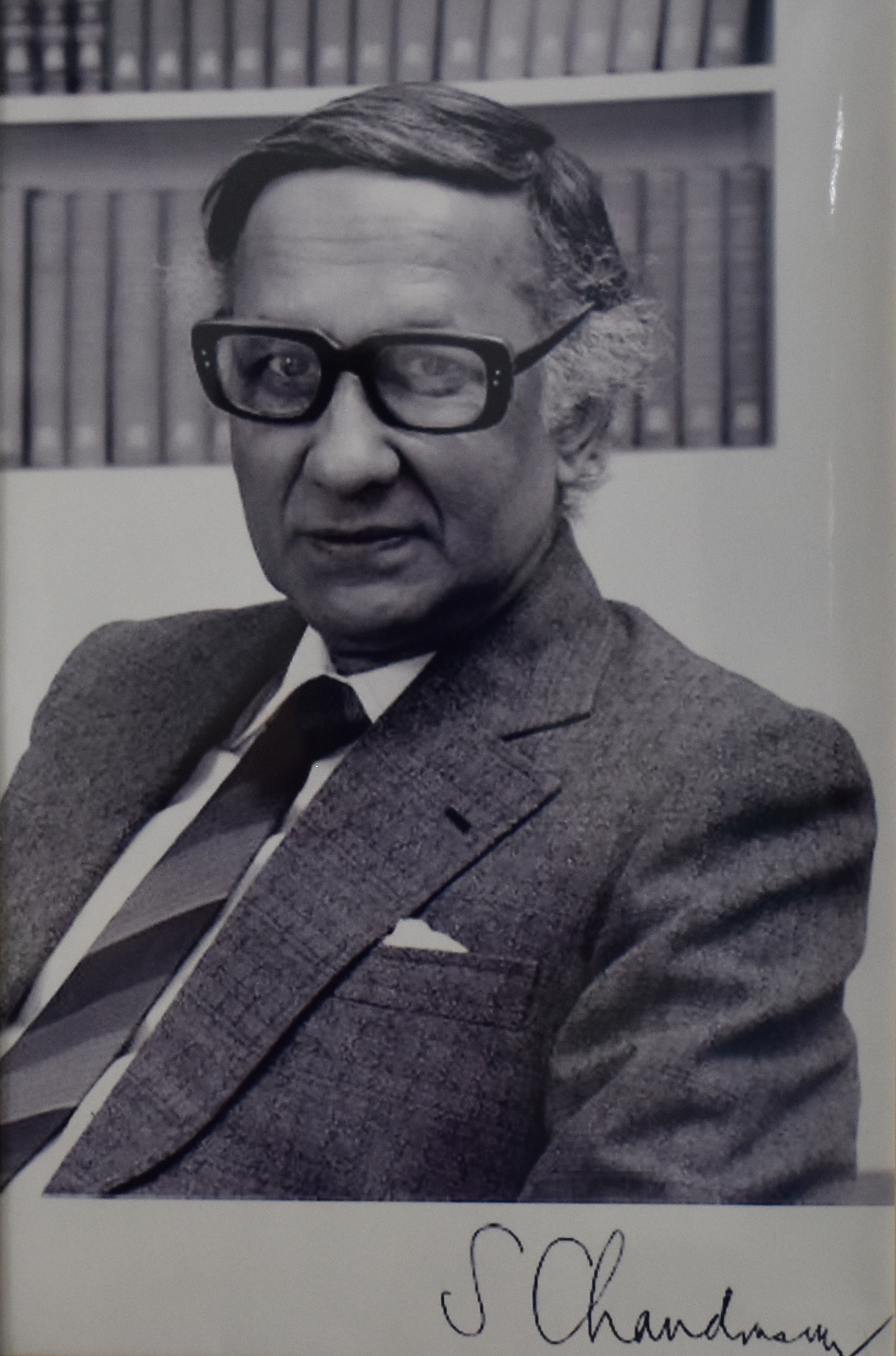
- Born: 6 August 1930; Calcutta, British India
- Died: 8 March 2004 (aged 73); Bengaluru, India
- Education: Nagpur University, University of Cambridge
- Known for: Liquid crystals
- Parents: Sivaramakrishnan (father); Sitalaxmi (mother)
- Relatives: C.V. Raman (uncle); S. Pancharatnam (brother); S. Ramaseshan (brother)
- Awards: Royal Medal (1994); Eringen Medal (1996)
- Scientific career
- Workplaces: University of Mysore, Raman Research Institute

Sivaramakrishna Chandrasekhar FNA, FRS (6 August 1930 – 8 March 2004) was an Indian physicist who won the Royal Medal in 1994. He was the founder-president of the International Liquid Crystal Society.

Chandrasekhar was born on 6 August 1930 at Kolkata, to Sitalaxmi (sister of C.V. Raman) and Sivaramakrishnan. He received his MSc degree in physics with first rank from Nagpur University in 1951. Subsequently, he joined the Raman Research Institute (RRI), Bangalore to work for his doctoral degree in physics under the guidance of his maternal uncle, C. V. Raman. The main topic of his research was related to optical rotatory dispersion measurements on several crystals. He received the D Sc degree from Nagpur University in 1954. Then he went to the Cavendish Laboratory on an 1851 Exhibition Scholarship and obtained a second doctorate degree from Cambridge University mainly for his work on the corrections for extinction in neutron and X-ray scattering from crystals.

His subsequent postdoctoral work in the University College and the Royal Institution at London also dealt with crystallographic problems. He returned to India in 1961 as the first Head of the Department of Physics, which had just been started in the University of Mysore at Mysore. It was here that he turned his attention to liquid crystals, a subject which at that time was just coming out of a long hibernation.

== Research ==
Liquid crystals made of rod-like molecules had been discovered in 1888, and many compounds had been synthesized at Halle, Saxony-Anhalt, Germany in the 1920s and 30s. Some physical studies had been undertaken by the German and Russian schools during that era, but the subject later languished till the mid-fifties. Starting in the late fifties, the systematic synthetic effort by George William Gray in the UK and the physical studies by Wilhelm Maier in Germany (including the well-known Maier–Saupe or MS theory) started a revival of the subject. Chandrasekhar and his co-workers made contributions to the application of the dynamical theory of reflections to study the fascinating optical properties of cholesteric liquid crystals which have a helical structure with a pitch which is usually ~ 0.5 mm, and to the extensions of the molecular theory of nematic liquid crystals beyond the MS model. Chandrasekhar was invited to establish a liquid crystal laboratory in RRI after the Department of Science and Technology started supporting it in 1971. The move had a highly positive impact on his productivity. Along with a couple of former students who moved with him to RRI, in a short time, he developed a laboratory with all the essential facilities needed for research in the chosen area. Realizing that cutting-edge research would not be possible without an in-house capacity to produce new materials, a synthetic organic chemistry laboratory was set up. Soon many new experimental and a few theoretical results emerged and the Liquid Crystal Laboratory at RRI became one of the leading centres of research in the world. The twisted nematic liquid crystal display was invented in Europe in 1971 and recently, LCDs have displaced CRTs as commercially the most important displays. In cooperation with Chandrasekhar and his colleagues, the Bharat Electronics Limited (BEL), Bangalore, developed indigenous know-how for the manufacture of simple LCDs for the domestic market.

== Columns ==
The pinnacle in Chandrasekhar's scientific career came in 1977, when he and his co-workers discovered the columnar phase of liquid crystals made of disc-shaped molecules, rather than the well-studied rods. Through supramolecular assembly, the discs exhibit a mesophase which has a two-dimensional, periodic order. The paper announcing the discovery of this state of matter was published in the Indian physics journal Pramana, and is one of the most highly cited papers in the field of liquid crystals. Subsequently, a few thousand compounds with disc-like molecules were synthesized. The columnar liquid crystals are noted for their highly anisotropic conducting properties, which is exploited in device applications.

The subject has had yet another resurgence in 1996, when Japanese scientists discovered new types of liquid crystalline phases exhibited by compounds made of another new type of (banana-shaped) molecule having bent-cores. Many such compounds exhibit columnar liquid crystalline phases.

== Publications and honors ==
The year 1977 also saw the publication of Chandrasekhar's book on liquid crystals by the Cambridge University Press. The book is popular amongst workers in the field, and has been translated into Russian and Japanese. An enlarged second edition of the book was published in 1992. Chandrasekhar also organized several international conferences, including the one in 1973 on the occasion of the Silver Jubilee of the founding of the RRI. Many stalwarts in the field of liquid crystals like Glen H. Brown, George William Gray, Alfred Saupe and Pierre-Gilles de Gennes (who was to receive the Nobel Prize in 1991, partly for his work on liquid crystals) participated in this conference. He was awarded A. Cemal Eringen Medal in 1996.

Other major conferences Chandrasekhar organized include the Ninth International Liquid Crystals Conference in 1982 and the Second Asia-Pacific Physics Conference in 1986. After retiring from the RRI in 1990, Chandrasekhar started the Centre for Liquid Crystal Research in a building made available by BEL in Bangalore. Chandrasekhar's scientific achievements brought him many honours. He was elected Fellow of all the three scientific academies in India, including the Indian Academy of Sciences (FASc, 1962) and the Indian National Science Academy (FNA, 1978). He was elected a Fellow of the Royal Society (FRS) in 1983, and was also a fellow of the Institute of Physics (London) and of the Third World Academy of Sciences. He was a member of several international and national committees on science and education.

Chandrasekhar was the founder president of the International Liquid Crystal Society for 1990–92, and was an editor of the journal Molecular Crystals and Liquid Crystals for 20 years. He was the recipient of the Bhatnagar Award (1972), the Homi Bhabha (1987) and Meghnad Saha (1992) medals of the Indian National Science Academy, C.V. Raman Centenary Medal of the Indian Association for the Cultivation of Science (1988), the Royal Medal of Royal Society (1994), Niels Bohr International Gold Medal of UNESCO (1998), and the Freedericksz Medal of the Russian Liquid Crystal Society (2000). He was also the recipient of the Karnataka Rajyotsava award (1986), Padma Bhushan (1998) and the honour of Knight of the Order of Academic Palms by the French Government (1999). Chandrasekhar was largely responsible for placing India on the international map in the field of liquid crystals. Chandrasekhar hailed from the most illustrious family of physicists in India.
