= International Liquid Crystal Society =

The International Liquid Crystal Society (ILCS) was founded in 1990 and currently has over 900 members in 43 countries worldwide. The ILCS was conceived in 1987 by Lui Lam and took three years to be founded at University of British Columbia, Vancouver, Canada, during the 13th International Liquid Crystal Conference. Specifically, the ILCS was born on July 27, 1990, in Vancouver, with 22 Members.

The aim of the Society is to unite scientists, engineers and students working in the broad field of fundamental and applied aspects of different liquid crystal systems, including thermotropic, lyotropic, polymer and polymer-modified liquid crystals. ILCS publishes two online publications on liquid crystals, Liquid Crystals Today, appearing under the sponsorship of Taylor & Francis, and archive-style electronic liquid crystal communications platform, e-lc.
