= Eklavya Technology Channel =

Indian distance learning programme

Eklavya Technology Channel is a distant learning joint initiative between the IIT and IGNOU. It was inaugurated by Prof. Murli Manohar Joshi, Honourable Minister, HRD, S&T and Ocean Development on 26 January 2003.

The objective of this initiative is to bring to the audience the actual IIT classrooms virtually at their door steps. It is a channel dedicated to technical education and shall run programs generated at different IITs. The channel is designed to carry video courses in different disciplines generated at various IITs on weekdays and special interest programs on Sundays. Currently, eight complete courses are being run in parallel, contributed by IIT Delhi, IIT Kharagpur and IIT Madras and are repeated in the same sequence without a break.

== Satellite Information ==
Satellite	Insat 3C
Orbital Location	74 degree East Longitude
Down link Polarization	Horizontal
Carrier type:	DVB-S MPEG-2
FEC	26000 1/2
Downlink Frequency	4165 H MHZ
Symbol Rate	14400 Ks/sec
