= Benzo(c)phenanthrene =

Organic molecule (C18H12) made of four fused benzene rings

Benzo[c]phenanthrene
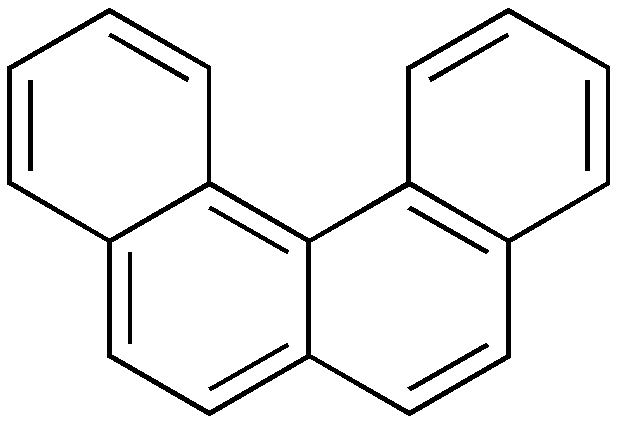

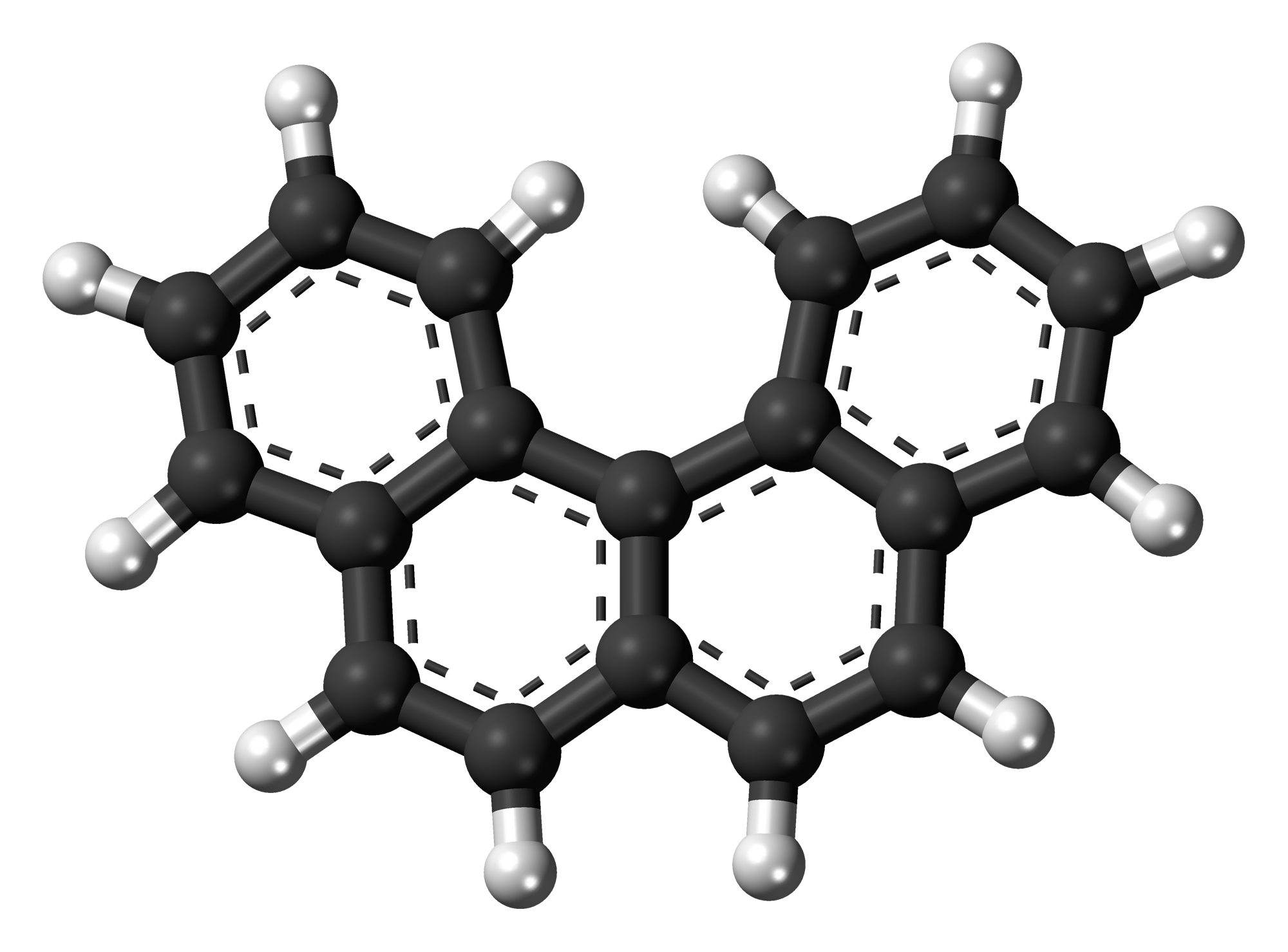

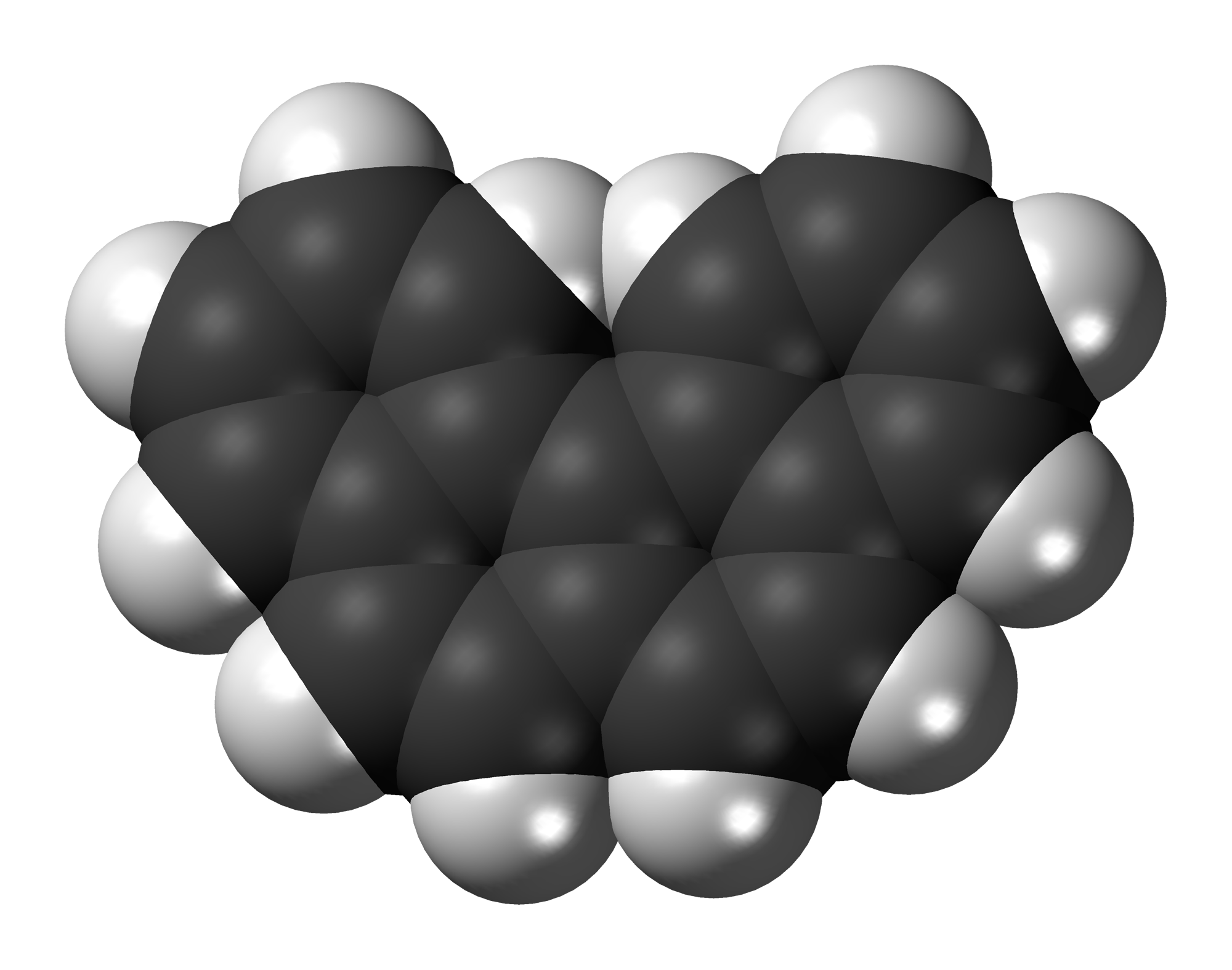

Names
- Preferred IUPAC name Benzo[c]phenanthrene
- Other names 3,4-Benzophenanthrene; Benzo[e]phenanthrene; Tetrahelicene

Identifiers
CAS Number	195-19-7
3D model (JSmol)	Interactive image
ChEBI	CHEBI:82292
ChemSpider	8782
ECHA InfoCard	100.005.362
EC Number	205-896-9
KEGG	C19197
PubChem CID	9136
UNII	H22XVR3V8A
CompTox Dashboard (EPA)	DTXSID4075459
- InChI: InChI=1S/C18H12/c1-3-7-16-13(5-1)9-11-15-12-10-14-6-2-4-8-17(14)18(15)16/h1-12H Key: TUAHORSUHVUKBD-UHFFFAOYSA-N; InChI=1/C18H12/c1-3-7-16-13(5-1)9-11-15-12-10-14-6-2-4-8-17(14)18(15)16/h1-12H Key: TUAHORSUHVUKBD-UHFFFAOYAU
- SMILES: c3cc2ccc1ccccc1c2c4ccccc34

Properties
Chemical formula	C_{18}H_{12}
Molar mass	228.294 g·mol^{−1}
Appearance	white solid
Density	1.19 g/cm^{3}
Melting point	68 °C (154 °F; 341 K)
Boiling point	436.7 °C (818.1 °F; 709.8 K) @760mmHg

Hazards
- GHS labelling
Pictograms	(GHS07: Exclamation mark) (GHS08: Health hazard)
Signal word	Warning
Hazard statements	H302, H312, H315, H319, H332, H335, H341, H351
Precautionary statements	P201, P202, P261, P264, P270, P271, P280, P281, P301+P312, P302+P352, P304+P312, P304+P340, P305+P351+P338, P308+P313, P312, P321, P322, P330, P332+P313, P337+P313, P362, P363, P403+P233, P405, P501
Flash point	209.1 °C (408.4 °F; 482.2 K)
- Except where otherwise noted, data are given for materials in their standard state (at 25 °C [77 °F], 100 kPa). verify (what is ?) Infobox references

Benzo[c]phenanthrene is a polycyclic aromatic hydrocarbon with the chemical formula C_{18}H_{12}. It is a white solid that is soluble in nonpolar organic solvents. It is a nonplanar molecule consisting of the fusion of four fused benzene rings. The compound is of mainly theoretical interest but it is environmentally occurring and weakly carcinogenic.
