= Mesophase =

Intermediate phase of matter between solid and liquid

In chemistry and chemical physics, a mesophase or mesomorphic phase is a phase of matter intermediate between solid and liquid. Gelatin is a common example of a partially ordered structure in a mesophase. Further, biological structures such as the lipid bilayers of cell membranes are examples of mesophases. Mobile ions in mesophases are either orientationally or rotationally disordered while their centers are located at the ordered sites in the crystal structure. Mesophases with long-range positional order but no orientational order are plastic crystals, whereas those with long-range orientational order but only partial or no positional order are liquid crystals.

Mesophases between solid and liquid

Georges Friedel (1922) called attention to the "mesomorphic states of matter" in his scientific assessment of observations of the so-called liquid crystals. Conventionally a crystal is solid, and crystallization converts liquid to solid. The oxymoron of the liquid crystal is resolved through the notion of mesophases. The observations noted an optic axis persisting in materials that had been melted and had begun to flow. The term liquid crystal persists as a colloquialism, but use of the term was criticized in 1993: In The Physics of Liquid Crystals the mesophases are introduced from the beginning:

...certain organic materials do not show a single transition from solid to liquid, but rather a cascade of transitions involving new phases. The mechanical properties and the symmetry properties of these phases are intermediate between those of a liquid and those of a crystal. For this reason they have often been called liquid crystals. A more proper name is ‘mesomorphic phases’ (mesomorphic: intermediate form)

Further, "The classification of mesophases (first clearly set out by G. Friedel in 1922) is essentially based on symmetry."

Molecules that demonstrate mesophases are called mesogens.

In technology, molecules in which the optic axis is subject to manipulation during a mesophase have become commercial products as they can be used to manufacture display devices, known as liquid-crystal displays (LCDs). The susceptibility of the optical axis, called a director, to an electric or magnetic field produces the potential for an optical switch that obscures light or lets it pass. Methods used include the Freedericksz transition, the twisted nematic field effect and the in-plane switching effect. From early liquid crystal displays the buying public has embraced the low-power optical switch facility of mesophases with director.

Consider a solid consisting of a single molecular species and subjected to melting. Ultimately it is rendered to an isotropic state classically referred to as liquid. Mesophases occur before then when an intermediate state of order is still maintained as in the nematic, smectic, and columnar phases of liquid crystals. Mesophases thus exhibit anisotropy. LCD devices work as an optical switch which is turned off and on by an electric field applied to the mesogen with director. The response of the director to the field is expressed with viscosity parameters, as in the Ericksen-Leslie theory in continuum mechanics developed by Jerald Ericksen and Frank Matthews Leslie. LCD devices work only up to the transition temperature when the mesophase changes to the isotropic liquid phase at the so-called clearing point.

Mesophase phenomena are important in many scientific fields. The publishing arms of professional societies have academic journals as needed. For instance, the American Chemical Society has both Macromolecules and Langmuir, while Royal Society of Chemistry has Soft Matter, and American Physical Society has Physical Review E, and Elsevier has Advances in Colloid and Interface Science.

== See also ==
- Condensed matter physics
- Sol-gel
- Walter Noll
- Viscoelasticity

== Notes and references ==
- Sivaramakrishna Chandrasekhar (1992) Liquid Crystals, 2nd edition, Cambridge University Press ISBN 0-521-41747-3 .
- David Dunmur & Tim Sluckin (2011) Soap, Science, and Flat-screen TVs: a history of liquid crystals, Oxford University Press ISBN 978-0-19-954940-5 .
- J. Prost & C.E. Williams (1999) "Liquid Crystals: Between Order and Disorder", pp 289–315 in Soft Matter Physics, Mohamed Daoud & Claudine E. Williams, editors, translated by Stephen N. Lyle from La Just Argile (1995), Springer Verlag ISBN 3-540-64852-6 .
