= Trinaphthylene =

Names
- Preferred IUPAC name Trinaphthylene

Identifiers
CAS Number	196-62-3
3D model (JSmol)	Interactive image
Beilstein Reference	2059933
ChEBI	CHEBI:33154
ChemSpider	119797
PubChem CID	136019
CompTox Dashboard (EPA)	DTXSID20173265
- InChI: InChI=1S/C30H18/c1-2-8-20-14-26-25(13-19(20)7-1)27-15-21-9-3-4-11-23(21)17-29(27)30-18-24-12-6-5-10-22(24)16-28(26)30/h1-18H Key: PGXOVVAJURGPLL-UHFFFAOYSA-N
- SMILES: C1=CC=C2C=C3C(=CC2=C1)C4=CC5=CC=CC=C5C=C4C6=CC7=CC=CC=C7C=C36

Properties
Chemical formula	C_{30}H_{18}
Molar mass	378.474 g·mol^{−1}
- Except where otherwise noted, data are given for materials in their standard state (at 25 °C [77 °F], 100 kPa). Infobox references

Trinaphthylene is a polycyclic aromatic hydrocarbon with the chemical formula C_{30}H_{18}. It can be obtained from triphthalylbenzene.
