= Organic conductor =

Organic material that exhibits metallic conductivity

An organic conductor, also known as a molecular conductor, is a material that is primarily composed of organic molecules and exhibits metallic conductivity. Most such materials are based on planar π-conjugated molecular systems and have attracted attention in the study of low-dimensional physics. They are also known for displaying a variety of electronic properties, including superconductivity, charge density waves, spin density waves, Mott insulators, and charge ordering. This field originated in the early 1950s and has developed through efforts to improve electrical conductivity and develop organic conductors and organic superconductors.

== Design strategy ==
In general, crystals composed of organic molecules exhibit low conductivity. This is because molecules are arranged such that atoms lack unpaired electrons, and these closed-shell molecules then form crystals through weak interactions, such as van der Waals forces. According to band theory, these molecular crystals become insulators because the energy levels below the valence band are fully occupied, while those above the conduction band are vacant.

To acquire electrical conductivity, the partial occupation of HOMO and LUMO constituting the valence and conduction bands is required. This causes the Fermi level to cross the bands, resulting in the realization of a metal in band theory. The primary method for achieving this is through charge transfer (CT) complexes. Introducing anions (or cations) as counterions to organic molecule crystals causes the molecules to undergo partial oxidation (or reduction) through charge transfer. Consequently, the organic molecules transition from a closed-shell to a radical state. To create conductive CT complexes, molecules must be designed to stabilize radical states while combining them with redox potentials that enable partial redox reactions.

Another way to achieve conductivity is to enhance intermolecular interactions, thereby overlapping the valence and conduction bands. Even when organic molecules are in a closed-shell state, some electrons transfer from the valence band to the conduction band due to band overlap. This achieves partial band filling and a semimetallic state in band theory. As described later, single-component molecular conductors exhibit metallic behaviors through this mechanism by designing molecules with strong three-dimensional intermolecular interactions.

== History ==
=== 1950s: the era of organic semiconductors ===
In the early 1950s, Japanese chemists Hideo Akamatu and Hiroo Inokuchi, and British chemist Dan Eley, independently reported that polycyclic aromatic compounds with π-conjugated systems exhibit relatively high conductivity. In 1954, Akamatu, Inokuchi, and Yoshio Matsunaga discovered that a perylene doped with bromine exhibits high conductivity 0.1 S/cm. This study of the perylene-bromine CT complex demonstrated that charge transfer is an efficient way of making organic compounds highly conductive.

=== 1960–70s: the era of organic metals ===
In 1960, DuPont Inc. synthesized tetracyanoquinodimethane (TCNQ) in the purpose of polymerization as an analogous compound of polytetrafluoroethylene, also known as Teflon. Although TCNQ didn't undergo the polymerization reaction, it was focused as a CT complex accepter because its four cyanide groups enable stable radical anion states. A Soviet research group led by Igor Shchegolev developed numerous TCNQ salts in the 1960s. The first material to exhibit metallic conductivity was NMP-TCNQ (NMP = N-methylphenazonium), developed by L. Russell Melby in 1965 and showing 140 S/cm of room conductivity. It was confirmed to exhibit temperature dependent of metallic conductivity from room temperature to 200 K by Alan Heeger and Anthony F. Garito in 1972.

Tetrathiafulvalene (TTF) was synthesized by Fred Wudl et al. in 1970 and functions as a CT complex donor. The CT complexes of TTF and its derivatives have been extensively researched to date. TTF-TCNQ, which consists of an accepter TCNQ and a donor TTF, is a representative material of one-dimensional organic conductors. Developed by Dwaine O. Cowan and John P. Ferraris in 1973, it was reported to exhibit conductivity of over 600 S/cm at room temperature and to undergo the Peierls transition at 53 K. Heeger and Garito interpreted the sharp increase in conductivity just before the transition as being due to superconducting fluctuations. Although this interpretation was later shown to result from experimental artifacts, their work encouraged many chemists and physicists to participate in the field of organic conductors.

TCNQ and TTF salts form one-dimensional systems that exhibit high conductivity in the columnar direction due to the planarity of their molecular structures. These materials are prone to undergoing the Peierls transition at low temperatures, resulting in insulating states such as charge and spin density waves, due to low-dimensional instability. To avoid this instability, molecules were designed to form higher electronic systems.

=== 1980–90s: the era of organic superconductors ===
Tetramethyltetraselenafulvalene (TMTSF) is a donor molecule derived from TTF by replacing the sulfur atoms with selenium and introducing methyl groups at the molecular terminals. The CT complexes of TMTSF, known as Bechgaard salts, form quasi-one-dimensional systems. In 1980, Klaus Bechgaard and Denis Jérome reported the first organic superconductor (TMTSF)_{2}PF_{6} with a critical temperature of 0.9 K at 12 kbar. The following year, Bechgaard et al. also developed an ambient pressure superconductor (TMTSF)_{2}ClO_{4} by using the smaller anion ClO_{4}^{−} rather than PF_{6}^{−}. Studies of TMTSF salts and its sulfur-substituted derivative TMTTF (tetramethyltetrathiafulvalene) salts were summarized in a Jérome diagram in 1991.

Bis(ethylenedithio)tetrathiafulvalene (BEDT-TTF) is a donor molecule that has yielded the greatest number of organic superconductors. It was first synthesized by Michael P. Cava et al. in 1978 and a different synthesis method was established by Gunji Saito in 1982. In the CT complexes of BEDT-TTF, the two-dimensional electronic systems are formed by introducing additional chalcogens and terminal ethylene groups. In 1982, it was reported that β''-(BEDT-TTF)_{2}ClO_{4}(1,1,2-TCE)_{0.5} exhibits metallic conductivity down to cryogenic temperatures. The first BEDT-TTF superconductor was β-(BEDT-TTF)_{2}I_{3}, which was developed by Eduard B. Yagubskii et al. In 1988, Saito and Hatsumi Mori et al. reported the development of κ-(BEDT-TTF)_{2}Cu(NCS)_{2} (T_{c} = 10.4 K), the first 10 K-class organic superconductor. In the 1990s, the research group at Argonne National Laboratory led by Jack M. Williams developed many 10 K-class organic superconductors. In addition to superconductivity, Mott insulating and charge ordering states are known as the ground states of BEDT-TTF salts.

=== Related topics since the 1990s ===
2,5-Bis(1,3-dithiol-2-ylidene)-1,3,4,6-tetrathiapentalene (BDT-TTP) is a donor molecule in which the molecular rings are all five-membered rings. It was first synthesized at IBM Research in 1980 and the synthesis method was improved by Yoji Misaki in 1990. The CT complexes of BDT-TTP exhibit the stable metallic conductivity down to cryogenic temperatures, regardless of the size and shape of the counteranions.

The first reported example of a single-component conductor was Tl_{2}Pc, in which two thallium atoms are coordinated to phthalocyanine (Pc), reported by a Polish research group in 1994. However, the synthesis is challenging, and the reported results have not been independently reproduced by the other research group. In 2001, Akiko Kobayashi et al. reported the single-component conductor Ni(tmdt)_{2} (tmdt = trimethylenetetrathiafulvalenedithiolate).

Since the middle 1990s, there has been attempts to introduce magnetic ions as a counterions and to develop systems involving both conducting π electrons and magnetic d electrons. In 2000, a Spanish research group led by Eugenio Coronado reported a material with coexisting metallic and ferromagnetic properties: (BEDT-TTF)_{3}[MnCr(C_{2}O_{4})_{3}].

== See also ==
- Conductive polymer
- Organic semiconductor
- Organic superconductor
- Graphite
- Graphene
- Fullerene
