= Reizo Kato =

Japanese chemist (1955–)

- 加藤 礼三
- Born: November 23, 1955 (age 70); Yamaguchi Prefecture, Japan
- Education: The University of Tokyo
- Awards: APS Fellow (2014)
- Scientific career
- Fields: Materials science
- Workplaces: Riken; The Institute for Solid State Physics, the University of Tokyo; Toho University
- Thesis: A Study of the Molecular Conductors Based on the BEDT-TTF Derivatives and/or the 1,2-Dithiolene Complexes (1984)
- Doctoral advisor: Yukiyoshi Sasaki

Reizo Kato (Japanese: 加藤 礼三, born 23 November 1955) is a Japanese chemist specializing in the development and physical characterization of molecular conductors and superconductors which is a field of materials science.

== Early life and career ==
Born in Yamaguchi Prefecture on 23 November 1955, he graduated from the Department of Chemistry, Faculty of Science, the University of Tokyo, in 1979. He received his M.Sc. in 1981 and his D.Sc. in 1984, both under the supervision of Yukiyoshi Sasaki at the same university.

He then served as a research assistant in the Faculty of Science at Toho University from 1984 to 1988, and as a lecturer at the same university from 1988 to 1990. In 1990, he transferred to the Institute for Solid State Physics at the University of Tokyo as an associate professor. In 1999, he moved to Riken, where he served as a Chief Scientist and a Director of the Condensed Molecular Materials Laboratory until 2021.

Since 2020, he has served as a Deputy Executive Director (Research Strategy Advisor) at Riken.

== Research ==
He has played a role in developing molecular conductors, superconductors, and magnets in Japan.

In 1989, he, together with Hayao Kobayashi and Akiko Kobayashi, reported on various (R_{1}, R_{2}-DCNQI)_{2}Cu radical anion salts (where DCNQI = N,N'-dicyanoquinonediimine and R_{1}, R_{2} = methyl, methoxy, chloro, and bromo groups) and investigated the effects of the substituents and the ground states of these materials.

In 1991, he established a synthesis method for bis(ethylenedithio)tetraselenafulvalene (BETS), which is a selenium-substituted derivative of bis(ethylenedithio)tetrathiafulvalene (BEDT-TTF), and some BETS salts exhibit magnetic-field-induced superconductivity.

He has conducted systematic studies on radical anion salts based on the metal dithiolene complex Pd(dmit)_{2}, where dmit represents 1,3-dithiole-2-thione-4,5-dithiolate. In particular, β'-EtMe_{3}Sb[Pd(dmit)_{2}]_{2} developed by his research group is a candidate quantum spin liquid.

In 2017, he and his collaborators reported that the single-component molecular conductor [Pd(dddt)_{2}] (where dddt = 5,6-dihydro-1,4-dithiin-2,3-dithiolate) possessed the electronic sturcture of a Dirac cone and related properties under high pressure.

== Awards ==
He received a Chemical Society of Japan Award for Young Chemists in 1990, an IBM Japan Science Prize in 1995, a Chemical Society of Japan Award for Creative Work in 2011, a MEXT Prize for Science and Technology in 2013, and a Japan Society for Molecular Science Award in 2017, for his achievements in researching and developing molecular functional materials.

He was also elected a Fellow of the American Physical Society in 2014 for his "pioneering works on the physics and materials science of molecular conductors and magnets".
