= Jack M. Williams =

American chemist

- Born: September 26, 1938 (age 88); Delta, Colorado, United States
- Education: Lewis & Clark College (BSc); Washington State University (PhD)
- Known for: Development of organic superconductors
- Scientific career
- Fields: Structural chemistry Inorganic chemistry Solid state chemistry
- Workplaces: Argonne National Laboratory

Jack Marvin Williams (born 26 September 1938) is an American chemist who contributed to the development of organic superconductors.

== Early life and career ==
Born in Delta, Colorado, he earned his BSc from Lewis & Clark College in 1960 and his PhD in physical and inorganic chemistry from Washington State University in 1966.

After obtaining his PhD, he served as a postdoctoral fellow at Argonne National Laboratory (ANL) in Illinois for two years. He was promoted to the positions of assistant chemist in 1968, associate chemist in 1970, chemist in 1972, and senior chemist in 1977. Additionally, he led the chemistry, material science, and technology divisions from 1977 onwards.

He also served as a visiting guest professor at the University of Missouri in 1980 and 1981 and at the University of Copenhagen in 1980 and 1985. He was also the chairman of the Gordon Research Conferences (Inorganic Chemistry) in 1980.

He retired from ANL in 1997 for health reasons.

== Research ==
His early research focused on elucidating the properties of chemical bonds using X-ray diffraction and neutron diffraction. Attending the International Conference on Synthetic Metals in 1979 in Helsingør, Denmark, where Klaus Bechgaard and Denis Jérome reported on the superconducting behavior of (TMTSF)_{2}PF_{6}, introduced him to superconductivity in organic charge-transfer complexes. Upon returning to ANL, he built up a program in organic conductors and superconductors.

He played a role in the development of organic superconductors in the United States. Building his background in structural and inorganic chemistry, he proposed design approaches for inorganic anions in organic charge-transfer complexes, which contributed to the discovery of several organic superconductors, including κ-type BEDT-TTF salts, by his research group.

== Awards ==
In 1989, he received an Alumni Achievement Award from Washington State University in recognition of his "outstanding accomplishments in research and service in the field of chemistry, bringing recognition to his alma mater".

== Selected publications ==
- Ferraro, John R.; Williams, Jack M. (1987-07-01). Introduction to Synthetic Electrical Conductors. Academic Pr. ISBN 9780122541209.
- Williams, Jack M.; Ferraro, John R. (1991-09-01). Organic Superconductors (Including Fullerenes : Synthesis, Structure, Properties, and Theory). Prentice Hall. ISBN 9780136405665.
