= C3H4S2 =

The molecular formula C_{3}H_{4}S_{2} may refer to:

- Dithioles
  - 1,2-Dithiole, a type of heterocycle with the parent 1,2-dithiacyclopentene
  - 1,3-Dithiole, a type of heterocycle with the parent 1,3-dithiacyclopentene
