= Anthony F. Garito =

American physicist

- Born: Anthony Frank Garito; New Rochelle, New York, United States
- Died: 1 November 2006 (aged 67); Radnor, Pennsylvania, United States
- Education: Columbia University; University of Pennsylvania
- Awards: APS Fellow (1998)
- Scientific career
- Fields: Solid state physics
- Workplaces: University of Pennsylvania
- Doctoral students: Mark G. Kuzyk

Anthony Frank Garito (died 1 November 2006) was an American physicist and Professor Emeritus of Physics at the University of Pennsylvania.

== Biography ==
Garito was born in New Rochelle, New York. He obtained a BS from Columbia University in 1962, and a PhD in chemistry from the University of Pennsylvania in 1968.

In 1970, he joined the University of Pennsylvania as an assistant professor of physics, was promoted to associate professor in 1973, and to full professor in 1978.

During this period, he served as a visiting scholar at the University of Paris in 1977 and at the Soviet Academy of Sciences in 1978. He was also a visiting professor at the University of Southern California in 1984. From 1986 to 1991, he was a team leader of the Molecular Device Research Team in the Frontier Materials Research Program at RIKEN in Japan.

He was elected a Fellow of the American Physical Society in 1998 and became an emeritus professor in 2002.

He died of lung cancer on 1 November 2006 at his home in Radnor, Pennsylvania.

== Research ==
His early research focused on organic charge-transfer complexes including collaborative work with Alan Heeger on TTF-TCNQ. In 1973, almost simultaneously with the independent research by John P. Ferraris et al., they reported a sharp increase in conductivity in TTF-TCNQ just before the Peierls transition, which they interpreted as arising from superconducting fluctuations. Combined with the theory of exciton superconductivity by William A. Little, the report attracted attention. Although this interpretation was later shown to result from experimental artifacts, their works stimulated the field of organic conductors.

He also researched nonlinear optical phenomena occurring at fast and ultrafast time scales in organic crystals and polymers.
