= History of superconductivity =

Superconductivity is the phenomenon of certain materials exhibiting zero electrical resistance and the expulsion of magnetic fields below a characteristic temperature. The history of superconductivity began with Dutch physicist Heike Kamerlingh Onnes's discovery of superconductivity in mercury in 1911. Since then, many other superconducting materials have been discovered and the theory of superconductivity has been developed. These subjects remain active areas of study in the field of condensed matter physics.

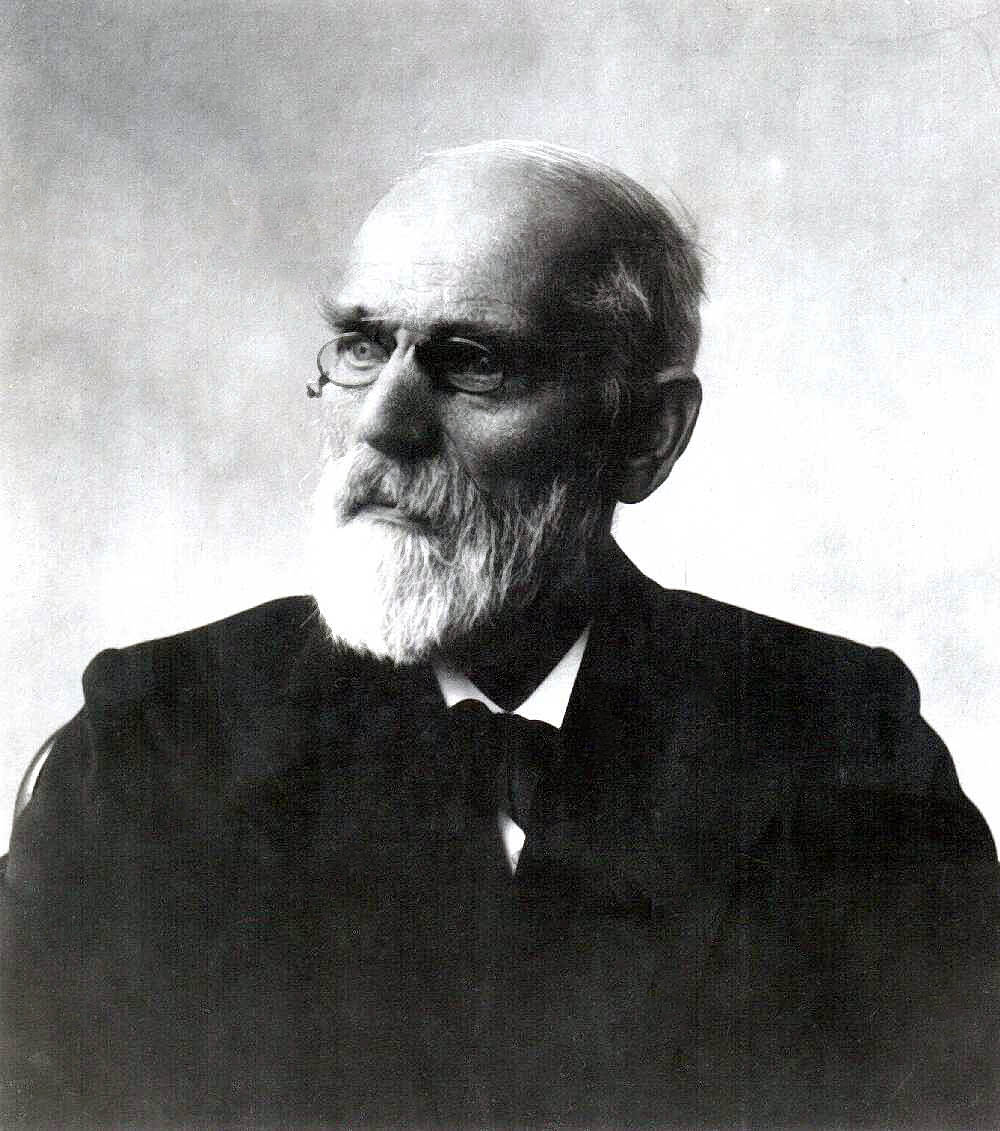
With the help of the Van der Waals' equation of state, the critical-point parameters of gases could be accurately predicted from thermodynamic measurements made at much higher temperatures. Heike Kamerlingh Onnes was influenced by the work of Van der Waals.

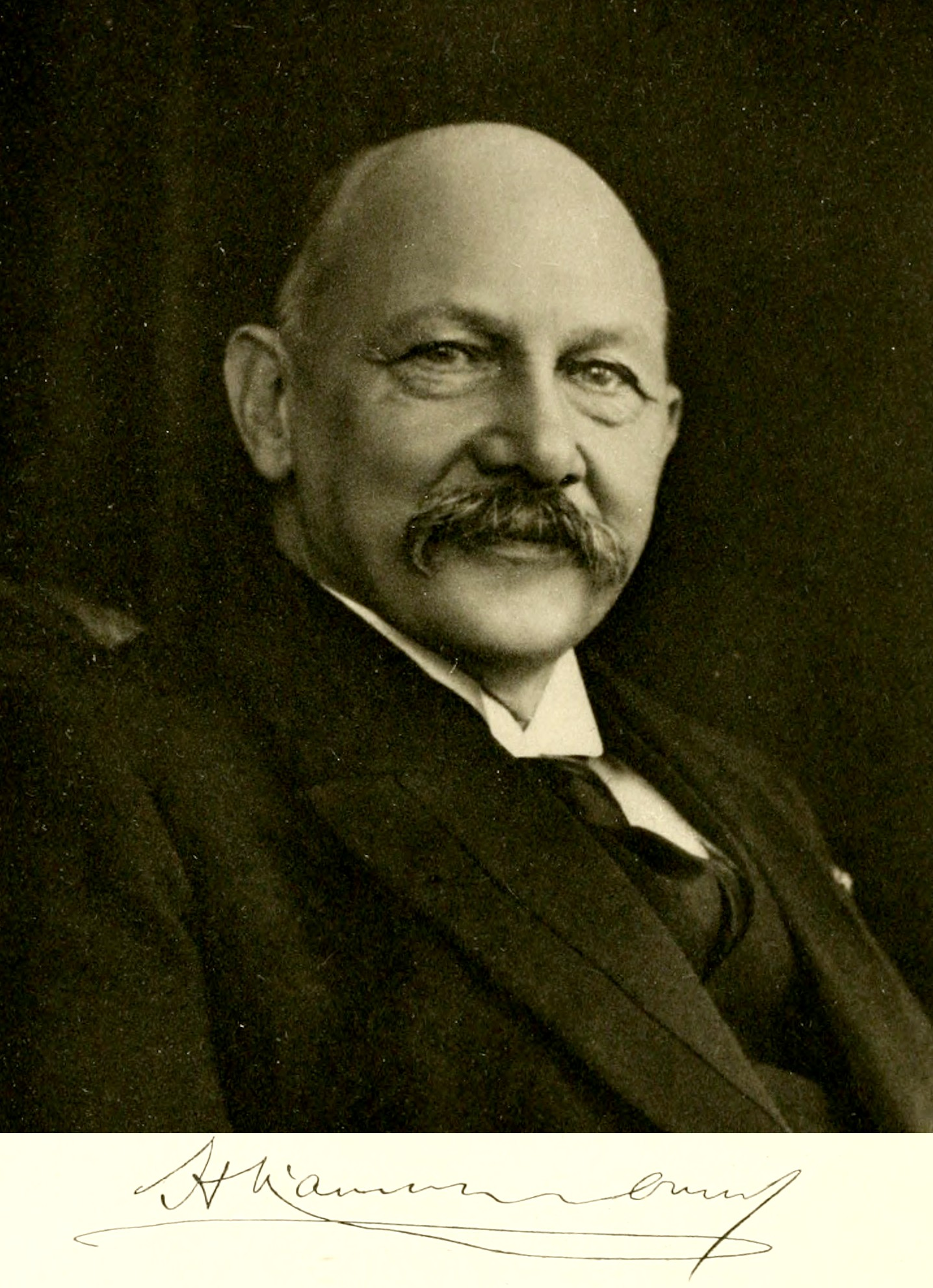
In 1908, Heike Kamerlingh Onnes became the first to make liquid helium and this led directly to his 1911 discovery of superconductivity.

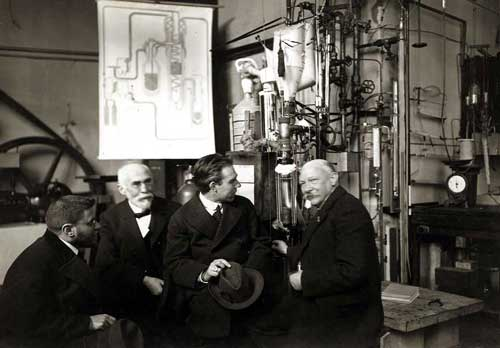
Heike Kamerlingh Onnes (right), the discoverer of superconductivity. Paul Ehrenfest, Hendrik Lorentz, Niels Bohr stand to his left.

== Exploring ultra-cold phenomena (to 1908) ==
James Dewar initiated research into electrical resistance at low temperatures. Dewar and John Ambrose Fleming predicted that at absolute zero, pure metals would become perfect electromagnetic conductors (though, later, Dewar altered his opinion on the disappearance of resistance, believing that there would always be some resistance). Walther Hermann Nernst developed the third law of thermodynamics and stated that absolute zero was unattainable. Carl von Linde and William Hampson, both commercial researchers, nearly at the same time filed for patents on the Joule–Thomson effect for the liquefaction of gases. Linde's patent was the climax of 20 years of systematic investigation of established facts, using a regenerative counterflow method. Hampson's designs was also of a regenerative method. The combined process became known as the Hampson–Linde liquefaction process.

Onnes purchased a Linde machine for his research. On March 21, 1900, Nikola Tesla was granted a patent for the means for increasing the intensity of electrical oscillations by lowering the temperature, which was caused by lowered resistance. Within this patent it describes the increased intensity and duration of electric oscillations of a low temperature resonating circuit. It is believed that Tesla had intended that Linde's machine would be used to attain the cooling agents.

A milestone was achieved on July 10, 1908, when Heike Kamerlingh Onnes at Leiden University in the Netherlands produced, for the first time, liquified helium, which has a boiling point of 4.2 K (−269 °C) at atmospheric pressure.

== Sudden and fundamental disappearance ==
Heike Kamerlingh Onnes and Jacob Clay reinvestigated Dewar's earlier experiments on the reduction of resistance at low temperatures. Onnes began the investigations with platinum and gold, replacing these later with mercury (a more readily refinable material). Onnes's research into the resistivity of solid mercury at cryogenic temperatures was accomplished by using liquid helium as a refrigerant. On April 8, 1911, 16:00 hours Onnes noted "Kwik nagenoeg nul", which translates as "[Resistance of] mercury almost zero." At the temperature of 4.19 K, he observed that the resistivity abruptly disappeared (the measuring device Onnes was using did not indicate any resistance). Onnes disclosed his research in 1911, in a paper titled "On the Sudden Rate at Which the Resistance of Mercury Disappears." Onnes stated in that paper that the "specific resistance" became thousands of times less in amount relative to the best conductor at ordinary temperature. Onnes later reversed the process and found that at 4.2 K, the resistance returned to the material. The next year, Onnes published more articles about the phenomenon. Initially, Onnes called the phenomenon "supraconductivity" (1913) and, only later, adopted the term "superconductivity." For his research, he was awarded the Nobel Prize in Physics in 1913.

Onnes conducted an experiment, in 1912, on the usability of superconductivity. Onnes introduced an electric current into a superconductive ring and removed the battery that generated it. Upon measuring the electric current, Onnes found that its intensity did not diminish with the time. The current persisted due to the superconductive state of the conductive medium.

In subsequent decades, superconductivity was found in several other materials; In 1913, lead at 7 K, in 1930's niobium at 10 K, and in 1941 niobium nitride at 16 K.

== Enigmas and solutions (1933–1979) ==
The next important step in understanding superconductivity occurred in 1933, when Walther Meissner and Robert Ochsenfeld discovered that superconductors expelled applied magnetic fields, a phenomenon that has come to be known as the Meissner effect. In 1935, brothers Fritz London and Heinz London showed that the Meissner effect was a consequence of the minimization of the electromagnetic free energy carried by superconducting current.

In 1937, Lev Shubnikov discovered a new type of superconductors (later called type-II superconductors), that presented a mixed phase between ordinary and superconductive properties.

In 1950, the phenomenological Ginzburg–Landau theory of superconductivity was devised by Lev Landau and Vitaly Ginzburg. The Ginzburg–Landau theory, which combined Landau's theory of second-order phase transitions with a Schrödinger-like wave equation, had great success in explaining the macroscopic properties of superconductors. In particular, Alexei Abrikosov showed that Ginzburg–Landau theory predicts the division of superconductors into the two categories now referred to as type I and type II superconductivity. Abrikosov and Ginzburg were awarded the 2003 Nobel Prize in Physics for their work (Landau having died in 1968). Also in 1950, Emanuel Maxwell and, almost simultaneously, C.A. Reynolds et al. found that the critical temperature of a superconductor depends on the isotopic mass of the constituent element. This important discovery pointed to the electron-phonon interaction as the microscopic mechanism responsible for superconductivity.

On the experimental side, collaborations of Bernd T. Matthias in the 1950s with John Kenneth Hulm and Theodore H. Geballe, led to the discovery of hundreds of low temperature superconductors using a technique based on the Meissner effect. Due to his experience, he came up with Matthias' rules in 1954, a set of empirical guidelines on how to find these types of superconductors.

=== BCS theory ===
The complete microscopic theory of superconductivity was finally proposed in 1957 by John Bardeen, Leon N. Cooper, and Robert Schrieffer. This BCS theory explained the superconducting current as a superfluid of Cooper pairs, pairs of electrons interacting through the exchange of phonons. For this work, the authors were awarded the Nobel Prize in Physics in 1972. The BCS theory was set on a firmer footing in 1958, when Nikolay Bogolyubov showed that the BCS wavefunction, which had originally been derived from a variational argument, could be obtained using a canonical transformation of the electronic Hamiltonian. In 1959, Lev Gor'kov showed that the BCS theory reduced to the Ginzburg-Landau theory close to the critical temperature. Gor'kov was the first to derive the superconducting phase evolution equation $2eV=\hbar\frac{\partial \phi}{\partial t}$.

=== Little–Parks effect ===
The Little–Parks effect was discovered in 1962 in experiments with empty and thin-walled superconducting cylinders subjected to a parallel magnetic field. The electrical resistance of such cylinders shows a periodic oscillation with the magnetic flux through the cylinder, the period being h/2e = 2.07×10^{−15} V·s. The explanation provided by William Little and Ronald Parks is that the resistance oscillation reflects a more fundamental phenomenon, i.e. periodic oscillation of the superconducting critical temperature (T_{c}). This is the temperature at which the sample becomes superconducting. The Little-Parks effect is a result of collective quantum behavior of superconducting electrons. It reflects the general fact that it is the fluxoid rather than the flux which is quantized in superconductors. The Little-Parks effect demonstrates that the vector potential couples to an observable physical quantity, namely the superconducting critical temperature.

== Commercial activity ==
Soon after discovering superconductivity in 1911, Kamerlingh Onnes attempted to make an electromagnet with superconducting windings but found that relatively low magnetic fields destroyed superconductivity in the materials he investigated. Much later, in 1955, George Yntema succeeded in constructing a small 0.7-tesla iron-core electromagnet with superconducting niobium wire windings. Then, in 1961, J. E. Kunzler, E. Buehler, F. S. L. Hsu, and J. H. Wernick made the startling discovery that at 4.2 kelvins, a compound consisting of three parts niobium and one part tin was capable of supporting a current density of more than 100,000 amperes per square centimeter in a magnetic field of 8.8 teslas. Despite being brittle and difficult to fabricate, niobium-tin has since proved extremely useful in supermagnets generating magnetic fields as high as 20 teslas. In 1962, Ted Berlincourt and Richard Hake discovered that less brittle alloys of niobium and titanium are suitable for applications up to 10 teslas. Promptly thereafter, commercial production of niobium-titanium supermagnet wire commenced at Westinghouse Electric Corporation and at Wah Chang Corporation. Although niobium-titanium boasts less-impressive superconducting properties than those of niobium-tin, niobium-titanium has, nevertheless, become the most widely used “workhorse” supermagnet material, in large measure a consequence of its very high ductility and ease of fabrication. However, both niobium-tin and niobium-titanium find wide application in MRI medical imagers, bending and focusing magnets for enormous high-energy particle accelerators, and a host of other applications. Conectus, a European consortium for superconductivity, estimated that in 2014, global economic activity, for which superconductivity was indispensable, amounted to about five billion euros, with MRI systems accounting for about 80% of that total.

In 1962, Brian Josephson made the important theoretical prediction that a supercurrent can flow between two pieces of superconductor separated by a thin layer of insulator. This phenomenon, now called the Josephson effect, is exploited by superconducting devices such as SQUIDs. It is used in the most accurate available measurements of the magnetic flux quantum h/2e, and thus (coupled with the quantum Hall resistivity) for the Planck constant h. Josephson was awarded the Nobel Prize in Physics for this work in 1973.

In 1973 Nb_{3}Ge found to have T_{c} of 23 K, which remained the highest ambient-pressure T_{c} until the discovery of the cuprate high-temperature superconductors in 1986 (see below).

== Unconventional superconductivity. ==
=== First unconventional superconductors ===
In 1979, two new classes of superconductors were discovered that could not be explained by BCS theory: heavy fermion superconductors and organic superconductors.

The first heavy fermion superconductor, CeCu_{2}Si_{2}, was discovered by Frank Steglich. Since then over 30 heavy fermion superconductors were found (in materials based on Ce, U), with a critical temperature up to 2.3 K (in CeCoIn_{5}).

Klaus Bechgaard and Denis Jérome synthesized the first organic superconductor (TMTSF)_{2}PF_{6} (the corresponding material class was named after him later) with a transition temperature of T_{C} = 0.9 K, at an external pressure of 11 kbar.

=== High-temperature superconductors ===
Superconductor timeline

In 1986, J. Georg Bednorz and K. Alex Mueller discovered superconductivity in a lanthanum-based cuprate perovskite material, which had a transition temperature of 35 K (Nobel Prize in Physics, 1987) and was the first of the high-temperature superconductors. It was shortly found (by Ching-Wu Chu) that replacing the lanthanum with yttrium, i.e. making YBCO, raised the critical temperature to 92 K, which was important because liquid nitrogen could then be used as a refrigerant (at atmospheric pressure, the boiling point of nitrogen is 77 K). This is important commercially because liquid nitrogen can be produced cheaply on-site with no raw materials, and is not prone to some of the problems (solid air plugs, etc.) of helium in piping. Many other cuprate superconductors have since been discovered, and the theory of superconductivity in these materials is one of the major outstanding challenges of theoretical condensed-matter physics.

In March 2001, superconductivity of magnesium diboride (MgB_{2}) was found with T_{c} = 39 K.

In 2008, the oxypnictide or iron-based superconductors were discovered, which led to a flurry of work in the hope that studying them would provide a theory of the cuprate superconductors.

In 2013, room-temperature superconductivity was attained in YBCO for picoseconds, using short pulses of infrared laser light to deform the material's crystal structure.

In 2017 it was suggested that undiscovered superhard materials (e.g. critically doped beta-titanium Au) might be a candidate for a new superconductor with Tc, substantially higher than HgBaCuO (138 K), possibly up to 233 K, which would be higher even than H_{2}S. A lot of research suggests that additionally nickel could replace copper in some perovskites, offering another route to room temperature. Li+ doped materials can also be used, i.e. the spinel battery material LiTi_{2}O_{x} and the lattice pressure can increase Tc to over 13.8 K. Also LiHx has been theorized to metallise at a substantially lower pressure than H and could be a candidate for a Type 1 superconductor.

== Historical publications ==
Papers by H.K. Onnes

- "The resistance of pure mercury at helium temperatures". Comm. Leiden. April 28, 1911.
- "The disappearance of the resistivity of mercury". Comm. Leiden. May 27, 1911.
- "On the sudden change in the rate at which the resistance of mercury disappears". Comm. Leiden. November 25, 1911.
- "The imitation of an ampere molecular current or a permanent magnet by means of a supraconductor". Comm. Leiden. 1914.

BCS theory

- Bardeen, J.; Cooper, L. N.; Schrieffer, J. R. (1957-12-01). "Theory of Superconductivity". Physical Review. 108 (5). American Physical Society (APS): 1175–1204. Bibcode:1957PhRv..108.1175B. doi:10.1103/physrev.108.1175. ISSN 0031-899X. S2CID 73661301.

Other key papers

- Meissner, W.; Ochsenfeld, R. (1933). "Ein neuer Effekt bei Eintritt der Supraleitfähigkeit". Die Naturwissenschaften (in German). 21 (44). Springer Science and Business Media LLC: 787–788. Bibcode:1933NW.....21..787M. doi:10.1007/bf01504252. ISSN 0028-1042. S2CID 37842752.
- F. London and H. London, "The electromagnetic equations of the supraconductor," Proc. Roy. Soc. (London) A149, 71 (1935), ISSN 0080-4630.
- V.L. Ginzburg and L.D. Landau, Zh. Eksp. Teor. Fiz. 20, 1064 (1950)
- Maxwell, Emanuel (1950-05-15). "Isotope Effect in the Superconductivity of Mercury". Physical Review. 78 (4). American Physical Society (APS): 477. Bibcode:1950PhRv...78..477M. doi:10.1103/physrev.78.477. ISSN 0031-899X.
- Reynolds, C. A.; Serin, B.; Wright, W. H.; Nesbitt, L. B. (1950-05-15). "Superconductivity of Isotopes of Mercury". Physical Review. 78 (4). American Physical Society (APS): 487. Bibcode:1950PhRv...78..487R. doi:10.1103/physrev.78.487. ISSN 0031-899X.
- A.A. Abrikosov, "On the magnetic properties of superconductors of the second group," Soviet Physics JETP 5, 1174 (1957)
- Little, W. A.; Parks, R. D. (1962-07-01). "Observation of Quantum Periodicity in the Transition Temperature of a Superconducting Cylinder". Physical Review Letters. 9 (1). American Physical Society (APS): 9–12. Bibcode:1962PhRvL...9....9L. doi:10.1103/physrevlett.9.9. ISSN 0031-9007.
- Josephson, B.D. (1962). "Possible new effects in superconductive tunnelling". Physics Letters. 1 (7). Elsevier BV: 251–253. Bibcode:1962PhL.....1..251J. doi:10.1016/0031-9163(62)91369-0. ISSN 0031-9163.

Patents

- Tesla, Nikola, U.S. patent 685,012 "Means for Increasing the Intensity of Electrical Oscillations", March 21, 1900.

== See also ==
- Superconductivity
- Macroscopic quantum phenomena
- Timeline of low-temperature technology
- Technological applications of superconductivity
- High-temperature superconductivity

== External links and references ==
- Heike Kamerlingh Onnes, "Investigations into the properties of substances at low temperatures, which have led, amongst other things, to the preparation of liquid helium," Nobel Lecture, December 11, 1913
- M. Tinkham, Introduction to Superconductivity, 2nd Ed., McGraw-Hill, NY, 1996, ISBN 0-486-43503-2
- T. Shachtman, Absolute Zero and the Conquest of Cold, Houghton Mifflin Co., 1999, ISBN 0-395-93888-0
- J. Matricon, G. Waysand and C. Glashausser, The Cold Wars: A History of Superconductivity, Rutgers University Press, 2003, ISBN 0-8135-3295-7
- J. Schmalian, Failed theories of superconductivity
