= Bechgaard =

Bechgaard is a surname of Danish origin. Notable people with the surname include:

- Julius Bechgaard (1843–1917), Danish composer
- Klaus Bechgaard (1945–2017), Danish scientist

== See also ==
- Bechgaard salt
