= John P. Ferraris =

American chemist

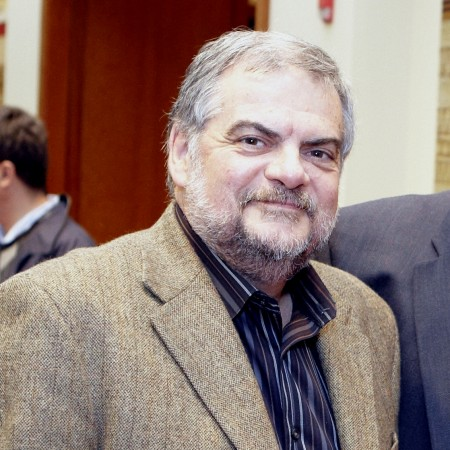
- Ferraris in 2016
- Born: April 1947
- Died: May 2025 (aged 78)
- Education: St. Michael's College, Johns Hopkins University
- Known for: Discovery of conductivity in TTF-TCNQ, conducting polymers, electrochemical materials
- Awards: W.T. Doherty Award (2001)
- Scientific career
- Fields: Chemistry, Materials Science
- Workplaces: University of Texas at Dallas

John P. Ferraris (April 1947 – May 2025) was an American chemist and professor at the University of Texas at Dallas. He was known for his pioneering work in the field of organic electronics, particularly the discovery that a charge-transfer complex between tetrathiafulvalene (TTF) and tetracyanoquinodimethane (TCNQ) exhibits high electrical conductivity. This finding helped establish the foundation for the development of conducting polymers and organic electronic materials.

== Early life and education ==
Ferraris earned his B.A. in chemistry from Saint Michael's College in Vermont in 1969. He then completed both an M.A. (1971) and a Ph.D. (1974) in organic chemistry at Johns Hopkins University. While a graduate student, he co-authored a seminal paper demonstrating high conductivity in a 1:1 charge-transfer salt of TTF and TCNQ, marking a significant advance in the field of organic conductors.

Following his doctoral studies, Ferraris was a National Research Council postdoctoral fellow at the National Bureau of Standards (now NIST) from 1973 to 1975.

== Career ==
Ferraris joined the chemistry faculty at the University of Texas at Dallas in 1975. He became a full professor in 1992 and served as head of the Department of Chemistry and Biochemistry from 1995 to 2017. Between 2003 and 2006, he was Interim Dean of the School of Natural Sciences and Mathematics. From 2006 to 2009, he held the Cecil H. and Ida Green Chair in Systems Biology Science.

He has authored over 150 publications and holds numerous U.S. patents. Ferraris has collaborated on interdisciplinary research in electroactive polymers, nanomaterials, gas separation membranes, and artificial muscles. He played a key role in the UT Dallas NanoTech Institute, working alongside Alan MacDiarmid, Ray Baughman, and Anvar Zakhidov.

== Research Contributions ==
=== Organic Conductors ===
Ferraris co-authored the 1973 paper reporting high conductivity in the TTF-TCNQ charge-transfer complex. This was the first demonstration of metallic-like conductivity in an organic material and laid the foundation for the field of organic metals and conducting polymers.

=== Conducting Polymers and Energy Materials ===
He developed low bandgap conjugated polymers for use in optoelectronic devices and contributed to the design of conductive membranes and polymer-based supercapacitors.

=== Nanotechnology and Devices ===
Ferraris co-developed super-tough carbon nanotube fibers and co-invented chemically powered artificial muscles.

== Awards and honors ==
- W.T. Doherty Award (2001), from the American Chemical Society's Dallas–Fort Worth Section.
- Cecil H. and Ida Green Chair in Systems Biology Science, held from 2006 to 2009.

== Selected publications ==
- Ferraris, J. P.; Cowan, D. O.; Walatka, V.; Perlstein, J. H. (1973). "Electron transfer in a new highly conducting donor-acceptor complex". Journal of the American Chemical Society. 95 (3): 948–949. doi:[10.1021/ja00784a066](https://doi.org/10.1021/ja00784a066).
- Dalton, A. B. et al. (2003). "Super-tough carbon-nanotube fibres". Nature. 423: 703. doi:[10.1038/423703a](https://doi.org/10.1038/423703a).
- Ebron, V. H. et al. (2006). "Fuel powered artificial muscles". Science. 311 (5767): 1580–1583. doi:[10.1126/science.1121401](https://doi.org/10.1126/science.1121401).
