= Hatsumi Mori =

Japanese physical chemist (1961–)

- 森 初果
- Born: Hatsumi Urayama; 1961 (age 64–65); Tokyo, Japan
- Education: Ochanomizu University
- Known for: Development of 10K-class organic superconductors
- Spouse: Takehiko Mori
- Scientific career
- Fields: Materials science Solid-state chemistry
- Workplaces: Tokyo University of Science; The Institute for Solid State Physics, the University of Tokyo; International Superconductivity Technology Center
- Thesis: Ambient Pressure Organic Superconductor κ-(BEDT-TTF)_{2}Cu(NCS)_{2} with T_{c} = 10.4 K (1992)
- Academic advisors: Yusei Maruyama

Hatsumi Mori (Japanese: 森 初果, born 1961) is a Japanese physical chemist and professor at the Tokyo University of Science, specializing in the development of molecular functional materials including organic conductors and organic superconductors. She served as an Executive Vice President at the University of Tokyo from April 2023 to March 2025 and as a Director at the Institute for Solid State Physics, the University of Tokyo from 2018 to 2023.

== Education and career ==
Born in Tokyo in 1961, she graduated from Fuji Senior High School, Tokyo Metropolitan Institute, in 1979. She then proceeded to the Department of Chemistry, Faculty of Science, at Ochanomizu University. She studied abroad at Rutgers University between 1981 and 1982. She graduated from Ochanomizu University in 1984 and received her MSc in 1986, both under the supervision of Yusei Maruyama, who moved to the Institute for Molecular Science during her studies, so she accompanied him there as a visiting student, and conducted her master's research while remaining affiliated with Haruo Hosoya's laboratory.。

After completing her master's program, she had planned to work at an electrical equipment manufacturer. However, having passed the national civil service examination and been invited by Gunji Saito, she took up a position as a technical officer at the Institute for Solid State Physics (ISSP), the University of Tokyo. In 1989, she transferred to the International Superconductivity Technology Center as a researcher, and was promoted to senior researcher in 1992 and to chief researcher in April 2001. She earned her BSc from the University of Tokyo in 1992.

In September 2001, she was appointed as an associate professor at ISSP, and was promoted to full professor in 2010. She served as ISSP Director from 2018 to 2023. From April 2023 to March 2025, she also served as Executive Vice President for Academic Management Strategy, International Co-Creation, Synchrotron Radiation Facilities, and the Innovation Corridor at the University of Tokyo. She retired from the University of Tokyo in March 2026, and was subsequently appointed as a professor and director at the Research Institute for Science and Technology at the Tokyo University of Science.

During her career, she was a member of the Science Council of Japan from 2020 to 2026. She has also been an associate member of the Science Council of Japan since 2011.

== Research ==
She has specialized in the development of molecular functional materials including organic conductors, organic superconductors, organic thyristors, proton-electron correlated organic systems, and oligomer conductors.

In 1988, she and her collaboraters reported the development of κ-(BEDT-TTF)_{2}Cu(NCS)_{2} (T_{c} = 10.4 K), the first 10 K-class organic superconductor.

== Personal ==
She married Takehiko Mori who is a physical chemist and an emeritus professor at the Institute of Science Tokyo.

== Awards ==
She received a MEXT Prize for Science and Technology in 2016, a Chemical Society of Japan Award for Creative Work in 2018, and a Japan Society for Molecular Science Award in 2022.
