= Charge ordering =

Charge ordering (CO) is a (first- or second-order) phase transition occurring mostly in strongly correlated materials such as transition metal oxides or organic conductors. Due to the strong interaction between electrons, charges are localized on different sites leading to a disproportionation and an ordered superlattice. It appears in different patterns ranging from vertical to horizontal stripes to a checkerboard–like pattern , and it is not limited to the two-dimensional case. The charge order transition is accompanied by symmetry breaking and may lead to ferroelectricity. It is often found in close proximity to superconductivity and colossal magnetoresistance.

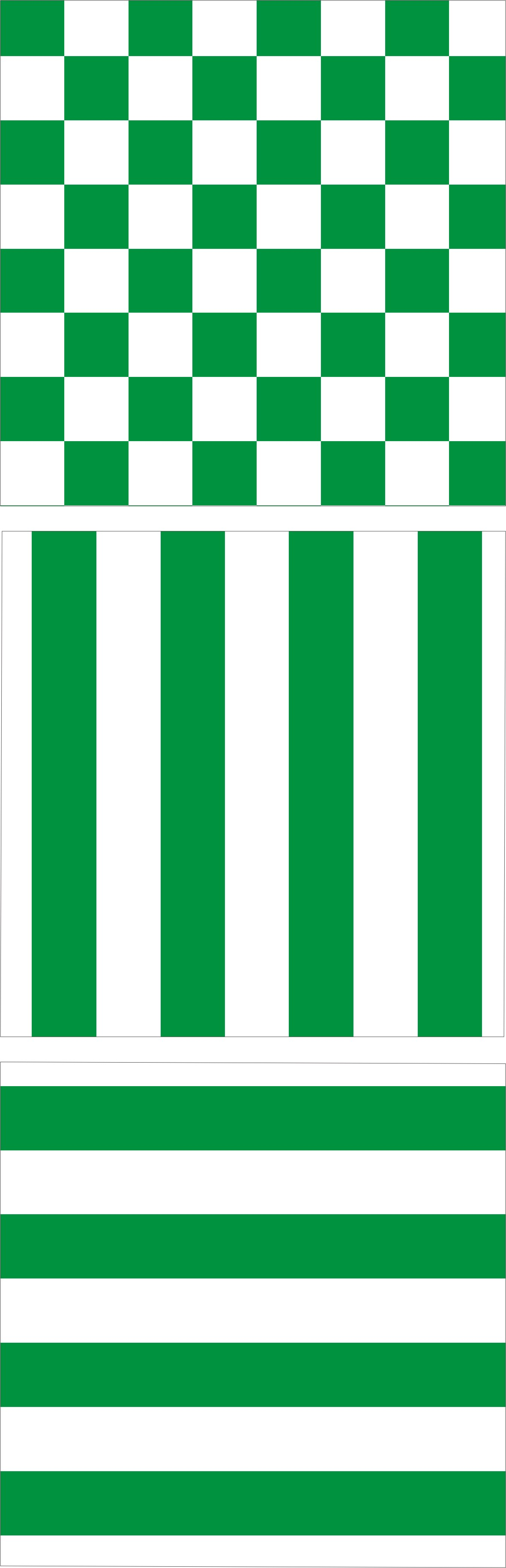
Charge order patterns

This long range order phenomena was first discovered in magnetite (Fe_{3}O_{4}) by Verwey in 1939. He observed an increase of the electrical resistivity by two orders of magnitude at T_{CO}=120K, suggesting a phase transition which is now well known as the Verwey transition. He was the first to propose the idea of an ordering process in this context. The charge ordered structure of magnetite was solved in 2011 by a group led by Paul Attfield with the results published in Nature. Periodic lattice distortions associated with charge order were later mapped in the manganite lattice to reveal striped domains containing topological disorder.

== Theoretical description ==
The extended one-dimensional Hubbard model delivers a good description of the charge order transition with the on-site and nearest neighbor Coulomb repulsion U and V. It emerged that V is a crucial parameter and important for developing the charge order state. Further model calculations try to take the temperature and an interchain interaction into account. The extended Hubbard model for a single chain including inter-site and on-site interaction V and U as well as the parameter $\delta_d$ for a small dimerization which can be typically found in the (TMTTF)_{2}X compounds is presented as follows:

$H = -t \sum_{i} \sum_{\sigma} \left ( \left [ 1+ \left(-1 \right)^i \delta_d \right ]c^{\dagger}_{i,\sigma}c_{i+1,\sigma}+ h.c \right)+ U \sum_i n_{i,\uparrow}n_{i,\downarrow} + V \sum_{i}n_i, n_{i+1}$

where t describes the transfer integral or the kinetic energy of the electron and $c^{\dagger}_{i,\sigma}$ and $c_{i+1,\sigma}$ are the creation and annihilation operator, respectively, for an electron with the spin $\sigma = \uparrow , \downarrow$ at the $i$th or $i+1$th site. $n_{i,\downarrow, \uparrow}$ denotes the density operator. For non-dimerized systems, $\delta_d$ can be set to zero Normally, the on-site Coulomb repulsion U stays unchanged only t and V can vary with pressure.

== Examples ==
=== Organic conductors ===
Organic conductors consist of donor and acceptor molecules building separated planar sheets or columns. The energy difference in the ionization energy acceptor and the electron affinity of the donor leads to a charge transfer and consequently to free carriers whose number is normally fixed. The carriers are delocalized throughout the crystal due to the overlap of the molecular orbitals being also reasonable for the high anisotropic conductivity. That is why it will be distinct between different dimensional organic conductors. They possess a huge variety of ground states, for instance, charge ordering, spin-Peierls, spin-density wave, antiferromagnetic state, superconductivity, charge-density wave to name only some of them.

==== Quasi-one-dimensional organic conductors ====
The model system of one-dimensional conductors is the Bechgaard-Fabre salts family, (TMTTF)_{2}X and (TMTSF)_{2}X, where in the latter one sulfur is substituted by selenium leading to a more metallic behavior over a wide temperature range and exhibiting no charge order. While the TMTTF compounds depending on the counterions X show the conductivity of a semiconductor at room temperature and are expected to be more one-dimensional than (TMTSF)_{2}X. The transition temperature T_{CO} for the TMTTF subfamily was registered over two order of magnitudes for the centrosymmetric anions X = Br, PF_{6}, AsF_{6}, SbF_{6} and the non-centrosymmetric anions X= BF_{4} and ReO_{4}. In the middle of the eighties, a new "structureless transition" was discovered by Coulon et al. conducting transport and thermopower measurements. They observed a suddenly rise of the resistivity and the thermopower at T_{CO} while x-ray measurements showed no evidence for a change in the crystal symmetry or a formation of a superstructure. The transition was later confirmed by ^{13}C-NMR and dielectric measurements.

Different measurements under pressure reveal a decrease of the transition temperature T_{CO} by increasing the pressure. According to the phase diagram of that family, an increasing pressure applied to the TMTTF compounds can be understood as a shift from the semiconducting state (at room temperature) to a higher dimensional and metallic state as you can find for TMTSF compounds without a charge order state.

Compound	T_{CO} (K)
(TMTTF)_{2}Br	28
(TMTTF)_{2}PF_{6}	70
(TMTTF)_{2}AsF_{6}	100.6
(TMTTF)_{2}SbF_{6}	154
(TMTTF)_{2}BF_{4}	83
(TMTTF)_{2}ReO_{4}	227.5
(DI-DCNQI)_{2}Ag	220
TTM-TTPI_{3}	120

==== Quasi-two-dimensional organic conductors ====
A dimensional crossover can be induced not only by applying pressure, but also be substituting the donor molecules by other ones. From a historical point of view, the main aim was to synthesize an organic superconductor with a high T_{C}. The key to reach that aim was to increase the orbital overlap in two dimension. With the BEDT-TTF and its huge π-electron system, a new family of quasi-two-dimensional organic conductors were created exhibiting also a great variety of the phase diagram and crystal structure arrangements.
At the turn of the 20th century, first NMR measurements on the θ-(BEDT-TTF)_{2}RbZn(SCN)_{4} compound uncovered the known metal to insulator transition at T_{CO}= 195 K as an charge order transition.

Compound	T_{CO} (K)
α-(BEDT-TTF)_{2}I_{3}	135
α'-(BEDT-TTF)_{2}IBr_{2}	200
θ-(BEDT-TTF)_{2}TlCo(SCN)_{4}	240
θ-(BEDT-TTF)_{2}TlZn(SCN)_{4}	165
θ-(BEDT-TTF)_{2}RbZn(SCN)_{4}	195
θ-(BEDT-TTF)_{2}RbCo(SCN)_{4}	190

=== Transition metal oxides ===
The most prominent transition metal oxide revealing a CO transition is the magnetite Fe_{3}O_{4} being a mixed-valence oxide where the iron atoms have a statistical distribution of Fe^{3+} and Fe^{2+} above the transition temperature. Below 122 K, the combination of 2+ and 3+ species arrange themselves in a regular pattern, whereas above that transition temperature (also referred to as the Verwey temperature in this case) the thermal energy is large enough to destroy the order.

Compound	T_{CO} (K)
Y_{0.5}NiO_{3}	582
YBaCo_{2}O_{5}	220
CaFeO_{3}	290
Ba_{3}NaRu_{2}O_{9}	210
TbBaFe_{2}O_{5}	282
Fe_{3}O_{4}	123
Li_{0.5}MnO_{2}	290
LaSrMn_{3}O_{7}	210
Na_{0.25}Mn_{3}O_{6}	176
YBaMn_{2}O_{6}	498
TbBaMn_{2}O_{6}	473
PrCaMn_{2}O_{6}	230
α'-NaV_{2}O_{5}	34

=== Alkali metal oxides ===
The alkali metal oxides rubidium sesquioxide (Rb_{4}O_{6}) and caesium sesquioxide (Cs_{4}O_{6}) display charge ordering.

== Detection of charge order ==
- NMR spectroscopy is a powerful tool to measure the charge disproportionation. To apply this method to a certain system, it has to be doped with nuclei, for instance ^{13}C as it is the case for TMTTF compounds, being active for NMR. The local probe nuclei are very sensitive to the charge on the molecule observable in the Knight shift K and the chemical shift D. The Knight shift K is proportional to the spin spin susceptibility χ_{Sp} on the molecule. The charge order or charge disproportionation appear as a splitting or broadening of the certain feature in the spectrum.
- The X-ray diffraction technique allows to determine the atomic position, but the extinction effect hinders to receive a high resolution spectrum. In the case of the organic conductors, the charge per molecule is measured by the change of the bond length of the C=C double bonds in the TTF molecule. A further problem arising by irradiating the organic conductors with x-rays is the destruction of the CO state.
- In the organic molecules like TMTTF, TMTSF or BEDT-TFF, there are charge-sensitive modes changing their frequency depending on the local charge. Especially the C=C double bonds are quite sensitive to the charge. If a vibrational mode is infrared active or only visible in the Raman spectrum depends on its symmetry. In the case of BEDT-TTF, the most sensitive ones are the Raman active ν_{3}, ν_{2} and the infrared out of phase mode ν_{27}. Their frequency is linearly associated to the charge per molecule giving the opportunity to determine the degree of disproportionation.
- The charge order transition is also a metal to insulator transition being observable in transport measurements as a sharp rise in the resistivity. Transport measurements are therefore a good tool to get first evidences of a possible charge order transition.
