= Tetramethyltetraselenafulvalene =

Names
- IUPAC name 2-(4,5-dimethyl-1,3-diselenol-2-ylidene)-4,5-dimethyl-1,3-diselenole
- Other names: TMTSF

Identifiers
CAS Number	55259-49-9
3D model (JSmol)	Interactive image
ChemSpider	126388
ECHA InfoCard	100.152.166
EC Number	623-491-9
PubChem CID	143265
CompTox Dashboard (EPA)	DTXSID20203773
- InChI: InChI=1S/C10H12Se4/c1-5-6(2)12-9(11-5)10-13-7(3)8(4)14-10/h1-4H3 Key: YMWLPMGFZYFLRP-UHFFFAOYSA-N
- SMILES: CC1=C([Se]C(=C2[Se]C(=C([Se]2)C)C)[Se]1)C

Properties
Chemical formula	C_{10}H_{12}Se_{4}
Molar mass	448.090 g·mol^{−1}
Appearance	purple powder
Density	g/cm^{3}
Melting point	275 °C (527 °F; 548 K)
Boiling point	338.8 °C (641.8 °F; 612.0 K)

Hazards
- GHS labelling
Pictograms	(GHS06: Toxic) (GHS08: Health hazard) (GHS09: Environmental hazard)
Signal word	Danger
Hazard statements	H301, H331, H373, H410
Precautionary statements	P260, P264, P273, P301, P304, P310, P311, P314, P340
- Except where otherwise noted, data are given for materials in their standard state (at 25 °C [77 °F], 100 kPa). Infobox references

Tetramethyltetraselenafulvalene is the organoselenium compound with the chemical formula ((CH_{3})_{2}C_{2}Se_{2}C)_{2}. It is one of the heterofulvalenes.

== Structure ==
TMTSF is a planar molecule with C_{2v} symmetry. It is structurally analogous to tetramethyltetrathiafulvalene (TMTTF). This structure is suitable for the role of TMTSF as an electron donor and the formation of some charge-transfer salts. A notable family of derivatives are the Bechgaard salts, e.g., (TMTSF)_{2}PF_{6}, the first organic superconductor.

== Synthesis ==
TMTSF is prepared from 3-chloro-2-butanone via a triselenocarbonate. Diethylselenocarbamate is a source of Se.

CH_{3}C(O)CHClCH_{3} + (CH_{3}CH_{2})_{2}NCSe^{−}_{2} → (CH_{3}CH_{2})_{2}NC(Se)SeCHC(O)(CH_{3})_{2} + Cl^{−}
(CH_{3}CH_{2})_{2}NC(Se)SeCHC(O)(CH_{3})_{2} + 2H^{+} → (CH_{3}CH_{2})_{2}N=CSe_{2}C_{2}(CH_{3})^{+}_{2} + H_{2}O
(CH_{3}CH_{2})_{2}N=CSe_{2}C_{2}(CH_{3})^{+}_{2} + SeH^{−} → Se=CSe_{2}C_{2}(CH_{3})_{2} + (CH_{3}CH_{2})_{2}NH
2 Se=CSe_{2}C_{2}(CH_{3})_{2} + 2 P(OCH_{3})_{3} → (CH_{3})_{2}C_{2}Se_{2}C=CSe_{2}C_{2}(CH_{3})_{2} + 2 SeP(OCH_{3})_{3}
