= 1,3,4,6-Tetrathiapentalene-2,5-dione =

Organosulfuric compound with formula C4O2S4

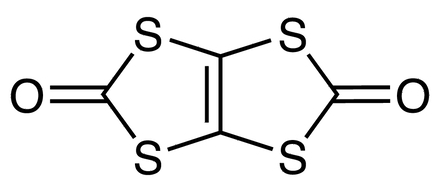

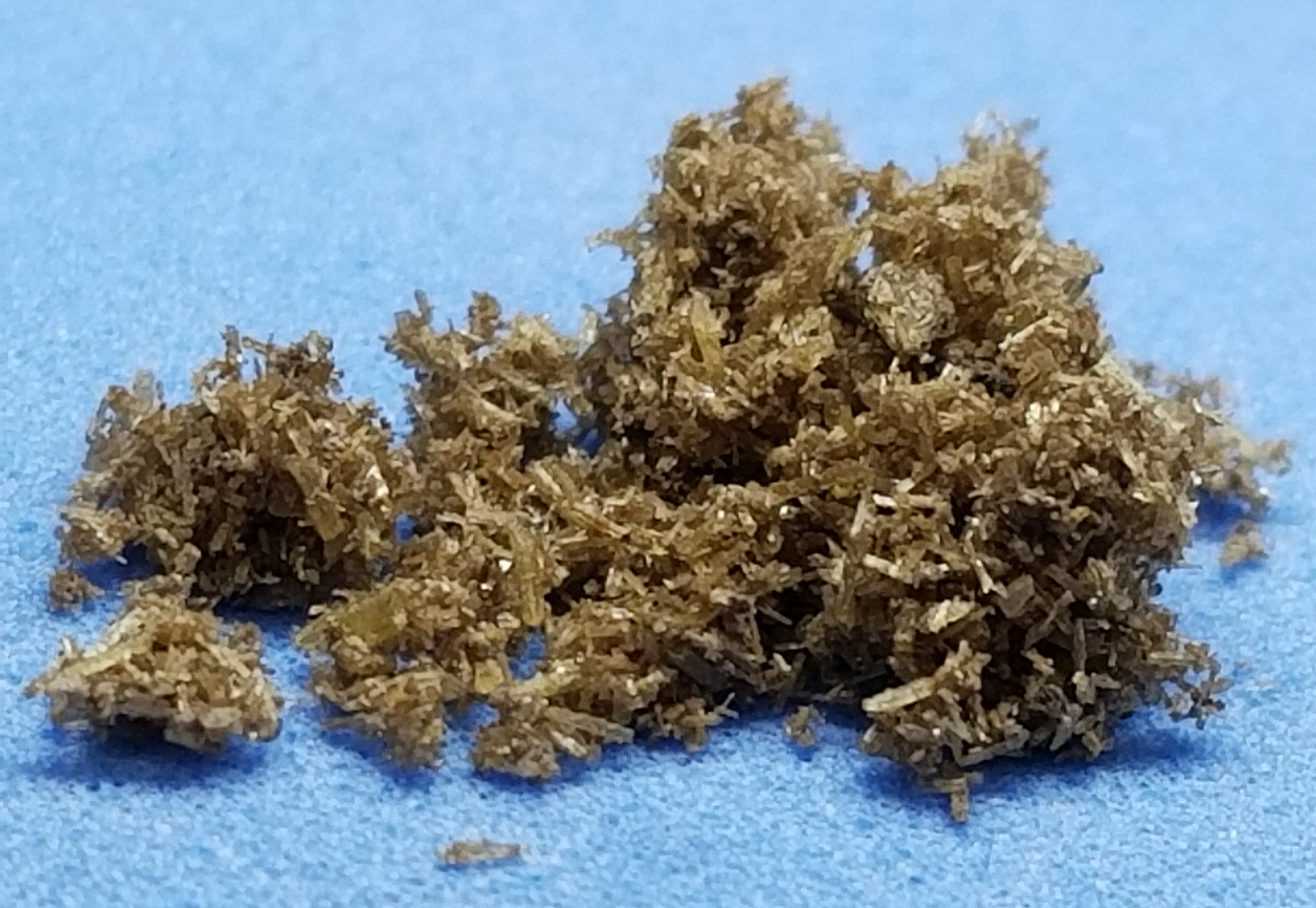

Names
- Preferred IUPAC name 2H,5H-[1,3]Dithiolo[4,5-d][1,3]dithiole-2,5-dione
- Other names Thiapendione [1,3]Dithiolo[4,5-d][1,3]dithiole-2,5-dione

Identifiers
CAS Number	64394-45-2
3D model (JSmol)	Interactive image
ChEMBL	ChEMBL84735
ChemSpider	482683
ECHA InfoCard	100.151.101
EC Number	622-328-9
PubChem CID	555056
- InChI: InChI=1S/C4O2S4/c5-3-7-1-2(9-3)10-4(6)8-1 Key: XMQJUIFJLYEFQR-UHFFFAOYSA-N
- SMILES: C12=C(SC(=O)S1)SC(=O)S2

Properties
Chemical formula	C_{4}O_{2}S_{4}
Molar mass	208.28 g·mol^{−1}
Density	2 g/cm^{3}

Structure
Crystal structure	Monoclinic
Space group	P2_{1}/c
Lattice constant	a = 3.9321(8) Å, b = 10.886(2) Å, c = 8.3000(9) Å α = 90°, β = 103.60(1)°, γ = 90°
Formula units (Z)	2
Molecular shape	D_{2h}
Dipole moment	0 D
- Except where otherwise noted, data are given for materials in their standard state (at 25 °C [77 °F], 100 kPa). Infobox references

1,3,4,6-Tetrathiapentalene-2,5-dione or thiapendione is a chemical compound with a formula C_{4}O_{2}S_{4}. It is a dithiole containing two carbonyl groups that is used in the synthesis of sulfur heterocyclic compounds.
