= Dithiolium salt =

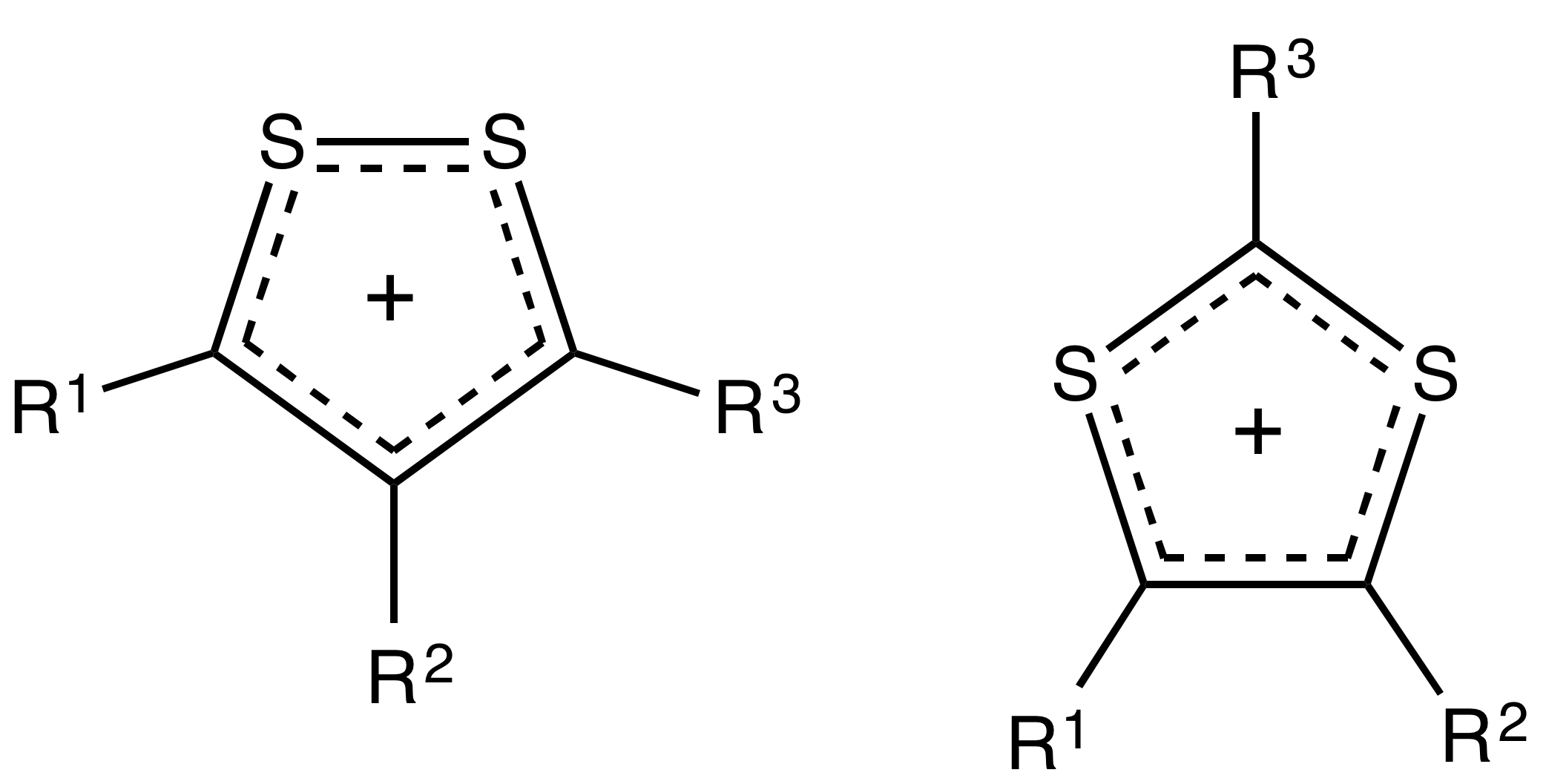
1,2- and 1,3-dithiolium cations.

Dithiolium salts are compounds of the formula [(RC)_{3}S_{2}]^{+}X^{−} (R = H, alkyl, aryl, etc.). These salts consist of a planar organic cation with a variety of anions such as halides. The five-membered ring cations are observed in either of two isomers, 1,2- and 1,3-dithiolium cations. These cations differ with respect to the relative positions of the pair of sulfur atoms. Both isomers feature a planar ring, which is aromatic owing to the presence of 6π electrons. For example, the 1,2-ditholium ring can be represented as an allyl cation of the three carbons, with each sulfur atom donating one of its lone pairs of electrons to give a total of three pairs.

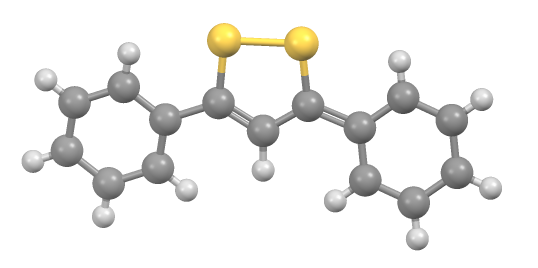
Structure of diphenyl-1,2-dithiolium cation (as its bisulfate salt). Selected distances: S-S = 2.019(5); S-C=173(1); C_{ring}-C_{ring} = 1.38(1) Å.

== Preparation, occurrence ==
1,2-Dithiolium cations have been prepared from 1,3-diketones by treatment with H_{2}S and oxidants such as bromine.

(RCO)_{2}CH_{2} + 2 H_{2}S + Br_{2} → [(RC)_{3}S_{2}]^{+}Br^{−} + 2 H_{2}O + HBr

They also arise by oxidation of 1,2-dithiole-3-thiones with peroxyacetic acid.

1,3-Dithiolium cations are often prepared by alkylation of the corresponding unsaturated dithio- or trithiocarbonates:

(RC)_{2}S_{2}CE + R'^{+} → [(RC)_{2}S_{2}CER']^{+}

The analogous reaction of electrophiles with 1,2-dithiole-2-ones affords 1,2-dithiolium cations.

== Reactions ==
By reduction, 1,2-dithiolium salts are precursors to dithioacetylacetonate complexes:

(RC)_{3}S^{+}_{2} + H^{−} → RC(S)CR=C(SH)CR
2 (RC(S)CR=C(SH)CR + NiCl_{2} → Ni(RC(S)CR=C(SH)CR)_{2} + 2 HCl

Primary amines attack 1,2-dithiolium salts to give α,ß-unsaturated β-aminothione derivatives:

(HC)_{2}(RC)S^{+}_{2} + 2 R'NH_{2} → R'NHCH=CRC(H)=S + R'NH^{+}_{3}
