= Sodium 1,3-dithiole-2-thione-4,5-dithiolate =

Names
- Preferred IUPAC name Disodium 2-sulfanylidene-2H-1,3-dithiole-4,5-bis(thiolate)

Identifiers
CAS Number	54995-24-3
3D model (JSmol)	Interactive image
ChemSpider	9405301
PubChem CID	129790408
- InChI: InChI=1S/C3H2S5.2Na/c4-1-2(5)7-8-3(1)6;;/h4-5H;;/q;2*+1/p-2 Key: JTYXTCNFMIILHG-UHFFFAOYSA-L; InChI=1S/C3H2S5.2Na/c4-1-2(5)8-3(6)7-1;;/h4-5H;;/q;2*+1/p-2
- SMILES: C1([S-])SC(SC=1[S-])=S.[Na+].[Na+]

Properties
Chemical formula	C_{3}Na_{2}S_{5}
Molar mass	242.31 g·mol^{−1}
Appearance	yellow solid
- Except where otherwise noted, data are given for materials in their standard state (at 25 °C [77 °F], 100 kPa). Infobox references

Sodium 1,3-dithiole-2-thione-4,5-dithiolate is the organosulfur compound with the formula Na_{2}C_{3}S_{5}, abbreviated Na_{2}dmit. It is the sodium salt of the conjugate base of the 4,5-bis(sulfanyl)-1,3-dithiole-2-thione. The salt is a precursor to dithiolene complexes and tetrathiafulvalenes.

Reduction of carbon disulfide with sodium affords sodium 1,3-dithiole-2-thione-4,5-dithiolate together with sodium trithiocarbonate:

4 Na + 4 CS_{2} → Na_{2}C_{3}S_{5} + Na_{2}CS_{3}

Before the characterization of dmit^{2-}, reduction of CS_{2} was thought to give tetrathiooxalate (Na_{2}C_{2}S_{4}).

The dianion C_{3}S_{5}^{2-} is purified as the tetraethylammonium salt of the zincate complex [Zn(C_{3}S_{5})_{2}]^{2-}. This salt converts to the bis(thioester) upon treatment with benzoyl chloride:

[N(C_{2}H_{5})_{4}]_{2}[Zn(C_{3}S_{5})_{2}] + 4 C_{6}H_{5}COCl → 2 C_{3}S_{3}(SC(O)C_{6}H_{5})_{2} + [N(C_{2}H_{5})_{4}]_{2}[ZnCl_{4}]

Cleavage of the thioester with sodium methoxide gives sodium 1,3-dithiole-2-thione-4,5-dithiolate:

C_{3}S_{3}(SC(O)C_{6}H_{5})_{2} + 2 NaOCH_{3} → Na_{2}C_{3}S_{5} + 2 C_{6}H_{5}CO_{2}Me

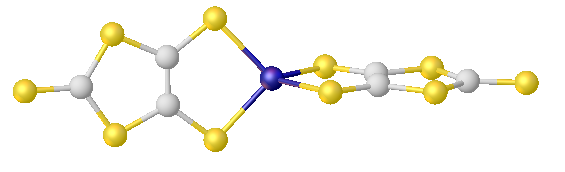
Structure of [Zn(dmit)_{2}]^{2-}.

Na_{2}dmit undergoes S-alkylation. Heating solutions of Na_{2}dmit gives the isomeric 1,2-dithioledithiolate.
