= Akiko Kobayashi (chemist) =

Japanese chemist

- 小林 昭子
- Born: 1943 (age 82–83); Tokyo, Empire of Japan
- Education: University of Tokyo
- Known for: Development of Ni(tmdt)_{2}
- Spouse: Hayao Kobayashi
- Awards: L'Oréal-UNESCO For Women in Science Awards (2009)
- Scientific career
- Fields: Solid-state chemistry
- Workplaces: University of Tokyo; Nihon University

Professor Akiko Kobayashi (小林 昭子, Kobayashi Akiko; born 1943) is a Japanese chemist born in Tokyo. She is the designer and creator of Ni(tmdt)2, the world's first single-component molecular metal.

== Biography ==
"Over the course of my career, one of the major difficulties I've encountered has to do with advancing to a new position, and I think this was probably a general problem for women scientists in Japan." -Akiko Kobayashi

Kobayashi was born in 1943. Her mother was a musician and her father was a physicist. Kobayashi graduated with a BSc from the University of Tokyo, Department of Chemistry in 1967 and earned her Ph.D. at the University of Tokyo in 1972. Staying at the university, she became a research associate (1972), associate professor (1993), and full professor (1999). In 2006, Kobayashi became a professor emeritus at the University of Tokyo and accepted a position at Nihon University.

She was a 2009 L'Oréal-UNESCO Awards for Women in Science laureate, "for her contribution to the development of molecular conductors and the design and synthesis of a single-component organic metal". The metal in question is known as "Ni(tmdt)_{2}", where "tmdt" is short for trimethylenetetrathiafulvalenedithiolate. This organic metal has unusual properties including the ability to exhibit metallic properties at just 0.6 of a degree above absolute zero. This material is paramagnetic and is attracted to magnetic fields at nearly every temperature below room temperature. The implications of Kobayashi's work is part of an emerging family of new materials with interesting and exploitable properties. Kobayashi's first discovery was based on nickel. Since then variations based on zinc and copper have been created and studied.

Additional honors include the Crystallographic Society of Japan Award (1998) and the Complex Chemical Society Award (2006).
