= Dithiole =

Chemical structures of 1,2-dithiole (left) and 1,3-dithole (right)

Dithiole is a type of sulfur-containing heterocycle. The parent members have the formula C_{3}H_{4}S_{2}. Dithioles exist in two isomers:

- 1,2-Dithiole
- 1,3-Dithiole
