= Transition metal dithioacetylacetonates =

Class of chemical compounds

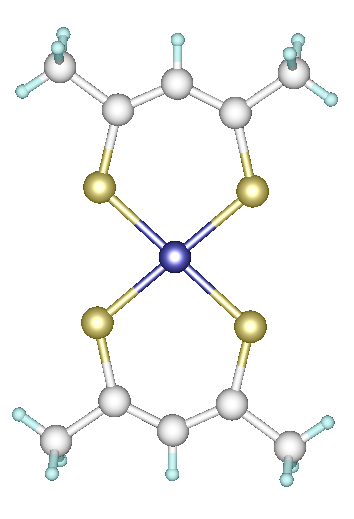
Structure of Co(sacsac)_{2}. Selected distances: Co-S, 2.166, C-S, 1.716 Å. Color code: dark blue = Co, yellow = S, white = C.

Transition metal dithioacetylacetonates are coordination complexes containing dithioacetylacetonate (CH_{3}CSCHCSCH^{−}_{3} ligands, abbreviated SacSac^{-}) and related ligands. Analogous to the situation for acetylacetonate complexes, SacSac^{-} ligands bind to the metal to form a six-membered MS_{2}C_{3} chelate ring. The simplest complexes have the formula M(SacSac)_{3} and M(SacSac)_{2}. Mixed-ligand complexes are also known, e.g. Fe(SacSac)_{2}(CO)_{2}.

== Synthesis ==
Dithioacetylacetone is not well-characterized, so complexes are prepared by indirect methods. In one approach, a solution of acetylacetone is treated with a mixture of hydrogen sulfide and hydrochloric acid prior to the addition of a metal halide. SacSac^{-} complexes can also be prepared by reduction of a 1,2-dithiolium salt with sodium borohydride followed by treatment with a metal salt. A common unsymmetrical version of HSacSac pro-ligand is the thionoester CH_{3}C(SH)=CHC(=S)OC_{2}H_{5}, which can be prepared from O-ethylthioacetate.

== Examples ==
Square planar complexes of the type M(SacSac)_{2} are known for Ni (red), Pd (red), Pt (violet), Co (violet). A tetrahedral bis(dithiochelate) has been characterized by X-ray crystallography for Zn(CH_{3}C(S)CHC(S)OC_{2}H_{5})_{2}. In contrast with these structures, M(acac)_{2} are dimeric or oligomeric for M = Co, Ni, Mn, Cd, Zn. The octahedral complex Fe(SacSac)_{3} is low-spin, in contrast to Fe(acac)_{3}.

== Related ligands ==
Complexes are also well known for monothioacetylacetone (HSacac). The free ligand is readily obtainable as a distillable liquid, which facilitates the preparation of its complexes. In contrast to low-spin Fe(SacSac)_{3}, derivatives of the type Fe(C_{6}H_{5}C(S)CHC(O)R)_{3} exhibit spin crossover behavior.
