= Trimethylenetetrathiafulvalenedithiolate =

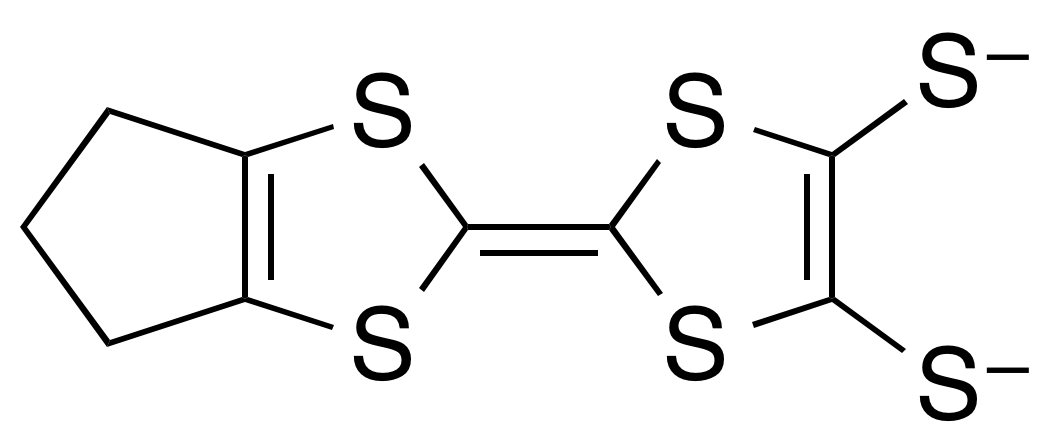

Names
- IUPAC name 2-(5,6-dihydro-4H-cyclopenta[d][1,3]dithiol-2-ylidene)-1,3-dithiole-4,5-dithiolate

Identifiers
CAS Number	1196461-91-2
3D model (JSmol)	Interactive image
PubChem CID	102208788
CompTox Dashboard (EPA)	DTXSID301336330
- InChI: InChI=1S/C9H8S6/c10-6-7(11)15-9(14-6)8-12-4-2-1-3-5(4)13-8/h10-11H,1-3H2/p-2 Key: DQTKCIVHDDGAFK-UHFFFAOYSA-L
- SMILES: [S-]C1=C([S-])SC(S1)=C2SC3=C(S2)CCC3

Properties
Chemical formula	C_{9}H_{6}S_{6}^{2−}
Molar mass	306.51 g·mol^{−1}
- Except where otherwise noted, data are given for materials in their standard state (at 25 °C [77 °F], 100 kPa). Infobox references

Trimethylenetetrathiafulvalenedithiolate (tmdt) is a ligand used in the making of metal organic electric conductors. It normally has a charge of −2. Known compounds include Ni(tmdt)_{2}, Pt(tmdt)_{2}, Pd(tmdt)_{2}, and Au(tmdt)_{2}.

The tmdt^{2−} ion is based on fulvalene, but with the four atoms adjacent to the bridging double bond replaced with sulfur yielding tetrathiafulvalene, at one end of the pair of rings is another five-member ring attached by adding three carbon atoms (the trimethylene part), and the other side of the fulvalene has two sulfur atoms, that bond to the metal ion.

The gold compound has an antiferromagnetic transition at 100 K (−173 °C).

Some of the sulfur atoms can be replaced by selenium to yield similar conducting compounds.

== List ==
formula	comment	CAS	ref
Ni(tmdt)_{2}			
Pd(tmdt)_{2}			
Pt(tmdt)_{2}		1196461-89-8	
Au(tmdt)_{2}		852955-03-4	
