= Tetracyanoquinodimethane =

Organic compound with formula C12H4N4

Tetracyanoquinodimethane (TCNQ)

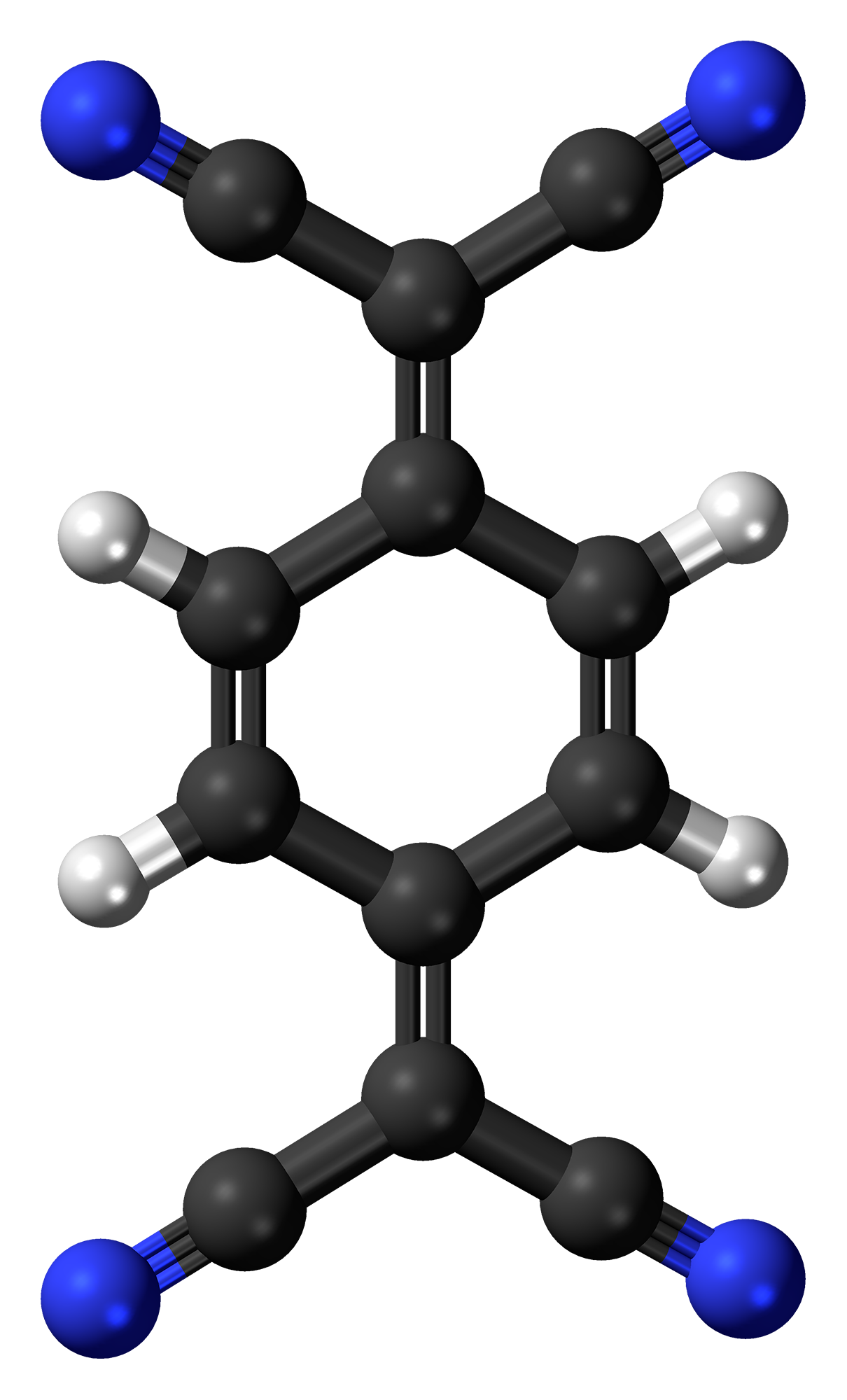

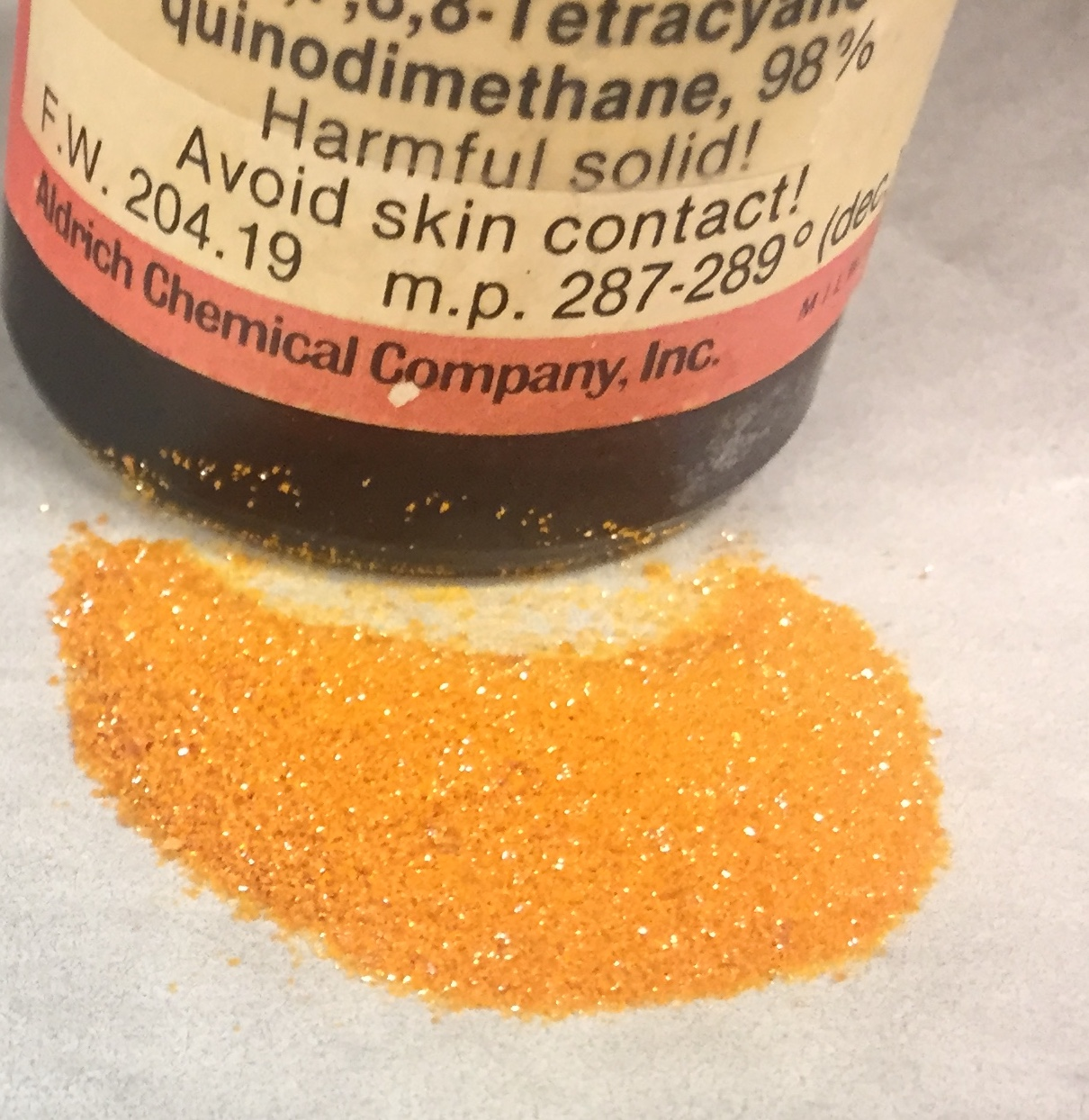
- Sample of TCNQ

Names
- Preferred IUPAC name 2,2′-(Cyclohexa-2,5-diene-1,4-diylidene)dipropanedinitrile
- Other names (2,5-Cyclohexadiene-1,4-diylidene) -dimalononitrile, 7,7,8,8-Tetracyanoquinodimethane

Identifiers
CAS Number	1518-16-7
3D model (JSmol)	Interactive image
ChEBI	CHEBI:52445
ChemSpider	66342
ECHA InfoCard	100.014.704
EC Number	216-174-8
PubChem CID	73697
UNII	HC6FB4H2KW
CompTox Dashboard (EPA)	DTXSID5061748
- InChI: InChI=1S/C12H4N4/c13-5-11(6-14)9-1-2-10(4-3-9)12(7-15)8-16/h1-4H Key: PCCVSPMFGIFTHU-UHFFFAOYSA-N; InChI=1S/C12H4N4/c13-5-11(6-14)9-1-2-10(4-3-9)12(7-15)8-16/h1-4H
- SMILES: c1cc(=C(C#N)C#N)ccc1=C(C#N)C#N

Properties
Chemical formula	C_{12}H_{4}N_{4}
Molar mass	204.192 g·mol^{−1}
Appearance	green colored powder or orange crystals
Melting point	293.5 to 296 °C (560.3 to 564.8 °F; 566.6 to 569.1 K)
Boiling point	Sublimes

Hazards
- GHS labelling
Pictograms	(GHS06: Toxic) (GHS07: Exclamation mark)
Signal word	Danger
Hazard statements	H302, H311, H312, H331
Precautionary statements	P261, P264, P270, P271, P280, P301+P310, P301+P312, P302+P352, P304+P312, P304+P340, P311, P312, P321, P322, P330, P361, P363, P403+P233, P405, P501
- Except where otherwise noted, data are given for materials in their standard state (at 25 °C [77 °F], 100 kPa). verify (what is ?) Infobox references

Tetracyanoquinodimethane (TCNQ) is an organic compound with the chemical formula (N≡C−)_{2}C=C_{6}H_{4}=C(−C≡N)_{2}. It is an orange crystalline solid. This cyanocarbon, a relative of para-quinone, is an electron acceptor that is used to prepare charge transfer salts, which are of interest in molecular electronics.

== Preparation and structure ==
TCNQ is prepared by the condensation of 1,4-cyclohexanedione with malononitrile, followed by dehydrogenation of the resulting diene with bromine:

C_{6}H_{8}O_{2} + 2 CH_{2}(CN)_{2} → C_{6}H_{8}(C(CN)_{2})_{2} + 2 H_{2}O
C_{6}H_{8}(C(CN)_{2})_{2} + 2 Br_{2} → C_{6}H_{4}(C(CN)_{2})_{2} + 4 HBr

The molecule is planar, with D_{2h} symmetry.

== Reactions ==
Like tetracyanoethylene (TCNE), TCNQ is easily reduced to give a blue-coloured radical anion. The reduction potential is about −0.3 V relative to the ferrocene/ferrocenium couple. This property is exploited in the development of charge-transfer salts. TCNQ also forms complexes with electron-rich metal complexes.

=== Charge transfer salts ===
TCNQ achieved great attention because it forms charge-transfer salts with high electrical conductivity. These discoveries were influential in the development of organic electronics. Illustrative is the product from treatment of TCNQ with the electron donor tetrathiafulvene (TTF), TCNQ forms an ion pair, the TTF-TCNQ complex, in which TCNQ is the acceptor. This salt crystallizes in a one-dimensionally stacked polymer, consisting of segregated stacks of cations and anions of the donors and the acceptors, respectively. The complex crystal is an organic semiconductor that exhibits metallic electric conductivity.

== Related compounds ==
- Tetracyanoethylene, another cyanocarbon that functions as an electron acceptor.
- Tetrathiafulvalene, another organic compound that functions as an electron donor.
