= Bechgaard salt =

Class of organic compounds that are superconductive at low temperatures

Tetrathiafulvalene (TTF) center typical in organic superconductors

In organic chemistry, a Bechgaard salt is any one of a number of organic charge-transfer complexes that exhibit superconductivity at low temperatures. They are named for chemist Klaus Bechgaard, who was one of the first scientists to synthesize them and demonstrate their superconductivity with the help of physicist Denis Jérome. Most Bechgaard salt superconductors are extremely low temperature, and lose superconductivity above the 1–2 K range, although the most successful compound in this class superconducts up to almost 12 K.

All Bechgaard salts are formed using a small, planar organic molecule as an electron donor, with any of a number of electron acceptors (such as perchlorate, ClO_{4}, or tetracyanoethylene, TCNE). All the organic electron donors contain multiply conjugated heterocycles with a number of properties, including planarity, low ionization potential and good orbital overlap between heteroatoms in neighboring donor molecules. These properties help the final salt conduct electrons by shuttling them through the orbital vacancies left in the donor molecules.

All Bechgaard salts have a variation on a single tetrathiafulvalene motif—different superconductors have been made with appendages to the motif, or using a tetraselenafulvalene center instead (which is a related compound), but all bear this general structural similarity.

There are a wide range of other organic superconductors including many other charge-transfer complexes.
