= Denis Jérome =

French experimental physicist

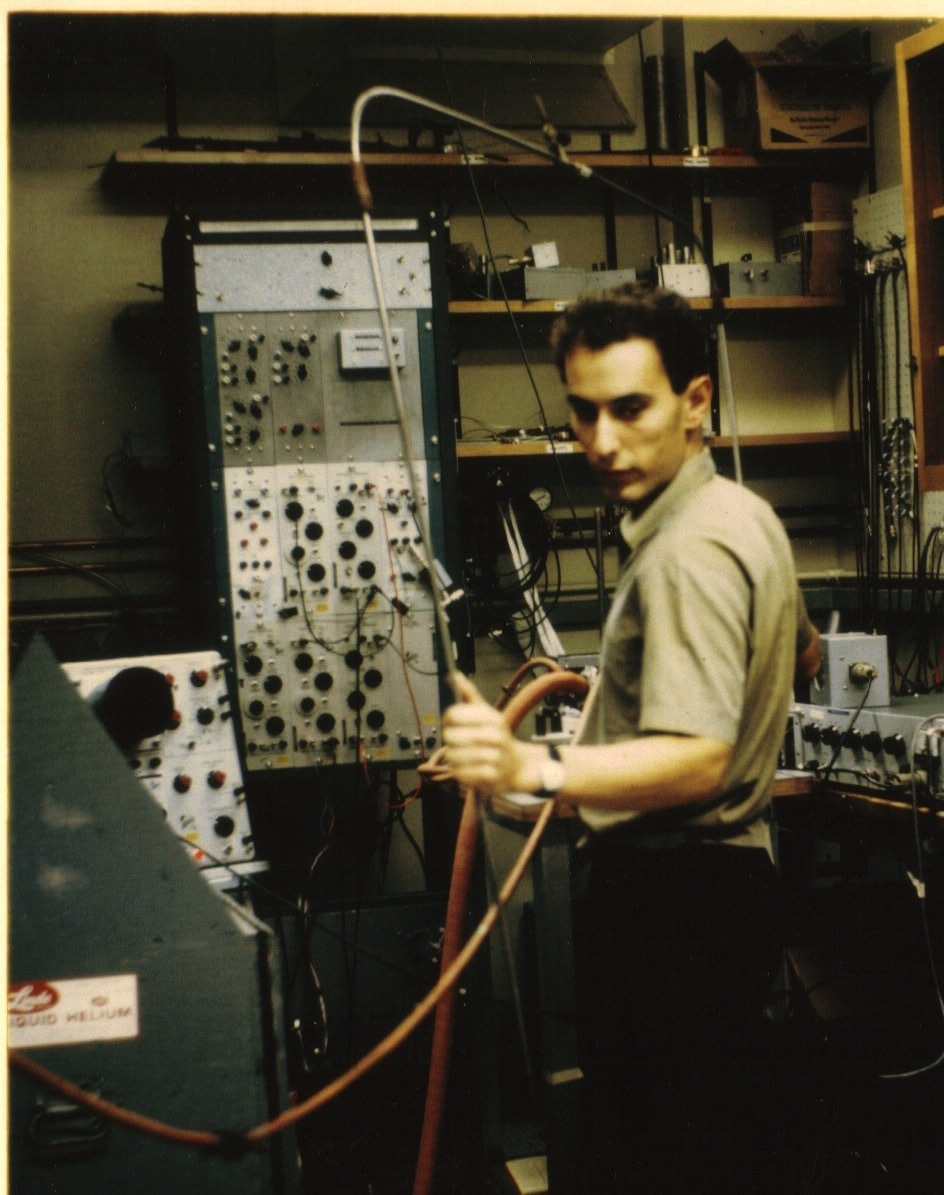
- Denis Jérome in La Jolia in 1964
- Born: February 28, 1939 (age 87); Paris, France
- Education: Sorbonne University; Paris-Saclay University
- Known for: Discovery of organic superconductors
- Scientific career
- Fields: Solid state physics Experimental physics
- Workplaces: French National Centre for Scientific Research; French Academy of Sciences
- Doctoral advisor: Anatole Abragam

Denis Jérome (born 28 February 1939 in Paris) is a French experimental physicist in the field of condensed matter, who contributed to the discovery of superconductivity in organic conductive matter.

== Career ==
He studied at the Sorbonne, where he obtained his bachelor's degree in science in 1960, then the diploma of advanced studies in solid-state physics. In 1965, he obtained his doctorate in science under the supervision of Professor Anatole Abragam at the University of Paris-Saclay.

From 1965 to 1966, he worked as a post-doctoral fellow at the University of California at San Diego, in the laboratory of Professor Walter Kohn, winner of the 1998 Nobel Prize in Chemistry, where he conducted research in collaboration with Professor T. M. Rice. He then continued his post-doctoral research at Harvard University until March 1967.

In October 1962, he joined the Centre national de recherche scientifique (CNRS) as a research intern. He successively became a research master in 1970, research director in 1980, and director of research emeritus of the CNRS in 2004.

In 1967, he formed the "study group on the electronic properties of metals and alloys under very high hydrostatic pressure and low temperature" at the University of Paris-Sud at the request of Professors Jacques Friedel and André Guinier.

He is a specialist in the physics of low-dimensional electrons and the metal-insulator transition, known as Nevill Mott's transition.

His major contribution to scientific knowledge is the discovery, in 1980, in cooperation with Professor Klaus Bechgaard, of the phenomenon of superconductivity in the organic solid with the detection of superconductivity at 0.9 K under a pressure of 12 kbar in Bechgaard salt (TMTSF)_{2}PF_{6}.

He has also contributed to the study of low-dimensional conductors, organic or inorganic, through various measurements of electronic properties under high pressure. He has published more than 390 scientific articles in international journals and several journal articles, book chapters. and in 2024 a retrospective on low dimensional organic conductors and superconductors.

He has been chief editor of several international scientific journals, Journal de Physique Lettres, Journal de Physique, European Physical Journal B and Europhysics Letters.

Within the framework of the French Academy of Sciences, of which he is a member in the Physics section, he coordinated the drafting of reports on the individual evaluation of researchers and teacher-researchers in the exact and experimental sciences in 2009, on the proper use of bibliometry in 2011 and on the new challenges of scientific publishing in 2014. He was President of the Physics section of the French Academy of Sciences from 2011 to 2015. He led a symposium on the interface between physics and chemistry in February 2013 and on the physics of condensed matter in the 21st century in January 2016.

== Distinctions ==
=== Prizes ===
- Bronze medal CNRS, 1965
- Laureate of the French Academy of Sciences (Doistaut-Blutel Prize), 1980
- Holweck Prize of the French Physical Society and Institute of Physics, 1985
- French Outreach Committee Award, 1990
- Hewlett Packard Europhysics Prize of the European Physical Society 1991, with Klaus Bechgaard for the discovery of organic superconduction
- Kelvin Lecturer, Society of Electrical Engineers in London, 1984
- Regent's Professor, University of California, Los Angeles, November 1992

=== Member of learned societies ===
- French Physical Society
- European Physical Society, Fellow of the European Physical Society
- Member of the French Academy of Sciences since 2005

=== Doctorates Honoris Causa and distinctions ===
- Doctor Honoris Causa of the Université de Sherbrooke and Speaker Walter Kohn, Canada, June 2005
- Doctor Honoris Causa from the University of Stuttgart, Germany, November 2005
- Fellow of the European Physical Society, October 2008

=== Decorations ===
- Officier in the Ordre National du Mérite, November 2008
- Chevalier in the Ordre of the Légion d'honneur, July 2016

== Family ==
Denis Jerome is the grandson of architect Lucien Bechmann who built part of the Cité Universitaire in Paris and the great grandson of Polytechnicien et ingénieur des Ponts et Chaussées Georges Bechmann who contributed to the construction of the North-South metro line in Paris and the construction of the sanitation network.

== Publications ==
- Bach, Jean-François; Jérome, Denis (2014). "Les nouveaux enjeux de l'édition scientifique" (PDF). Rapports de l'Académie des Sciences (in French). Institut de France: 56.
- Bach, Jean-François; Jérome, Denis (2011). "Du bon usage de la bibliométrie pour l'évaluation individuelle des chercheurs" (PDF). Rapport de l'Académie des Sciences (in French). Institut de France: 70.
- D. Jerome and H. J. Schulz: Organic conductors and superconductors, Advances in Physics, 51, 293-479, 2002.
- D. Jérome, A. Mazaud, M. Ribault and K. Bechgaard, "Superconductivity in a synthetic organic conductor TMTSF2PF6", Journal de Physique Lettres, vol. 41, no. 4, 1980, p. 95-98 (read online[archive]).
- D. Jerome and C. Bourbonnais, "Quasi one-dimensional organic conductors: from Fröhlich conductivity and Peierls insulating state to magnetically-mediated superconductivity, a retrospective", Comptes Rendus Physique, vol. 25, 2024, p. 17-178 (https://doi.org/10.5802/crphys.164).
