= 1,3-Dithiole =

Names
- Preferred IUPAC name 2H-1,3-Dithiole
- Other names 1,3-Dithiacyclopentene

Identifiers
CAS Number	288-74-4
3D model (JSmol)	Interactive image
ChemSpider	4475898
PubChem CID	5316944
UNII	H3S82P9ZAT
CompTox Dashboard (EPA)	DTXSID40415715
- InChI: InChI=1S/C3H4S2/c1-2-5-3-4-1/h1-2H,3H2 Key: IVJFXSLMUSQZMC-UHFFFAOYSA-N
- SMILES: C1SC=CS1

Properties
Chemical formula	C_{3}H_{4}S_{2}
Molar mass	104.19 g·mol^{−1}
- Except where otherwise noted, data are given for materials in their standard state (at 25 °C [77 °F], 100 kPa). Infobox references

In organosulfur chemistry, 1,3-dithioles are a class of heterocycles based on the parent compound 1,3-dithiacyclopentene (also known as 1,3-dithiole). The ligand dmit^{2-} is a 1,3-dithiole. Heating solutions of Na_{2}dmit gives the isomeric disulfide, a 1,2-dithiole.

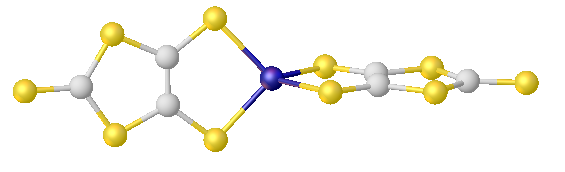
Structure of the anion [Zn(dmit)_{2}]^{2-}, featuring two 1,3-dithiole-4,5-dithiolate ligands complexed to zinc.
