= Klaus Bechgaard =

Danish scientist (1945–2017)

- Born: 5 March 1945; Copenhagen, Denmark
- Died: 7 March 2017 (aged 72); Copenhagen, Denmark
- Known for: Bechgaard salt organic superconductors
- Scientific career
- Fields: Chemistry
- Institutions: University of Copenhagen; Risø

Klaus Bechgaard (5 March 1945 – 7 March 2017) was a Danish scientist and chemist, noted for being one of the first scientists in the world to synthesize a number of organic charge transfer complexes and demonstrate their superconductivity, therefore the name Bechgaard salt. These salts all exhibit superconductivity at low temperatures.

The first organic superconductor was discovered by Bechgaard and Denis Jérome in 1979. This discovery garnered attention in the international scientific community, and for a period he was one of the most cited scientists in the field of natural sciences. He also received a nomination for the Nobel Prize in chemistry for this discovery.

== Research ==
Klaus Bechgaard did research at the University of Copenhagen, where he also held a Professorship in organic chemistry until 1993. From 1993 until 2000 he was the chairman of the Department of Physics and Chemistry at Risø and in 2001 he was appointed head of the newly assigned Department of Polymer Research at Risø. From 2001 and onwards he was the head of Risø's nano technology programme, and The Danish Center of Polymers which is a joint venture between the Technical University of Copenhagen and Risø.

Bechgaard also conducted research in the field of polymers and nano technology at the University of Copenhagen.

== Career and achievements ==
Education:

- 1969: Cand scient. Organic Chemistry, University of Copenhagen
- 1973: Lic.Scient. (Chemistry), University of Copenhagen.

Academic Appointments:

- 1974–1984: Lecturer at the University of Copenhagen.
- 1984–1989: Research Professor at the University of Copenhagen
- 1989–1993: Professor of Organic Chemistry at the University of Copenhagen.
- 1993–2000: Head of the Department of Condensed Matter Physics and Chemistry. Risø
- 2001–2003: In charge of the Interdisciplinary Nanotechnology Programme, Risø
- 2001–2003: Temporary Head of The Danish Polymer Centre and the Polymer Department Risø
- 2004–2017: Professor of Chemistry at the University of Copenhagen (May 2004 – March 2017). Deputy Head of Department

Other:

- 2004: A. J. Heeger Endowed Chair, UCSB, Santa Barbara

Honours:

- 1983: Elected member of the Danish Academy of Natural Sciences
- 1984: Elected member of the Royal Danish Academy.
- 2002: Elected member of the French Academy of Sciences

Publications:

- Approximately 370 peer reviewed papers in Chemistry and Solid State Physics, 7 patents

Awards:

- 1981: The HN-prize
- 1986: The B.S. Friedmann-prize, University of California
- 1987: The Director Ib Henriksen's Foundation Research award
- 1990: The Macintosh Research award
- 1991: EPS Europhysics Prize
- 1991: The Hewlett Packard Europhysics prize
- 1997: The NKT scientific prize
- 2000: The EU Descartes prize
- 2008: The Hartmann Foundation memorial prize

== See also ==
- Bechgaard salt
- Unconventional superconductor
- Organic superconductor
- Van Hove singularity
- Tetrathiafulvalene
- Tetracyanoethylene
- Solid-state chemistry
