= 1,2-Dithiole =

Names
- Preferred IUPAC name 3H-1,2-Dithiole
- Other names: 1,2-Dithiacyclopentene; 1,2-Dithiole; 1,2-Dithiolene

Identifiers
CAS Number	288-26-6
3D model (JSmol)	Interactive image
ChemSpider	457993
PubChem CID	525331
UNII	NDY9U8RY64
CompTox Dashboard (EPA)	DTXSID901031881
- InChI: InChI=1S/C3H4S2/c1-2-4-5-3-1/h1-2H,3H2 Key: PCGDBWLKAYKBTN-UHFFFAOYSA-N; InChI=1/C3H4S2/c1-2-4-5-3-1/h1-2H,3H2 Key: PCGDBWLKAYKBTN-UHFFFAOYAI
- SMILES: C1C=CSS1

Properties
Chemical formula	C_{3}H_{4}S_{2}
Molar mass	104.19 g·mol^{−1}
- Except where otherwise noted, data are given for materials in their standard state (at 25 °C [77 °F], 100 kPa). Infobox references

In organosulfur chemistry, 1,2-dithioles are a type of heterocycles. The parent of this class of compounds is 1,2-dithiacyclopentene. The anticancer drug oltipraz is a dithiole. Trithiapentalene is an example of theoretical interest.

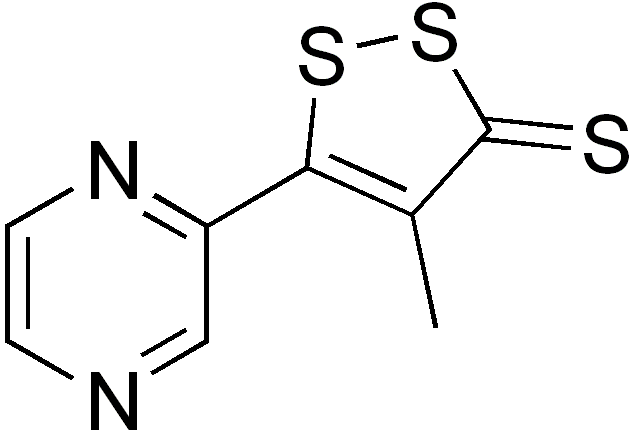
The drug oltipraz features a 1,2-dithiole ring.

Many 1,2-dithioles are 1,2-dithiol-3-thiones.

The parent 1,2-dithiole has been characterized as its diruthenium complex.

== See also ==
- Dithiolium salt
