= Organic superconductor =

Organic compound that exhibits superconductivity at low temperatures

An organic superconductor is an organic compound that exhibits superconductivity. All examples exhibit superconductivity only at very low temperatures but are of interest for explaining the origin of superconductivity.

As of 2007 the highest achieved critical temperature for an organic superconductor at standard pressure is 33 K (−240 °C; −400 °F), observed in the alkali-doped fullerene RbCs_{2}C_{60}.

In 1979 Klaus Bechgaard synthesized the first organic superconductor (TMTSF)_{2}PF_{6} (the corresponding material class was named after him later) with a transition temperature of T_{c} = 0.9 K (−272.2 °C; −458.0 °F), at an external pressure of 12,000 bar (170,000 psi). Bechgaard salts and Fabre salts are both quasi-one-dimensional, and quasi-two-dimensional materials such as k-BEDT-TTF_{2}X charge-transfer complex, λ-BETS_{2}X compounds, graphite intercalation compounds and three-dimensional materials such as the alkali-doped fullerenes.

== One-dimensional Fabre and Bechgaard salts ==
Fabre-salts are composed of tetramethyltetrathiafulvalene (TMTTF) and Bechgaard salts of tetramethyltetraselenafulvalene (TMTSF). These two organic molecules are similar except for the sulfur-atoms of TMTTF being replaced by selenium-atoms in TMTSF. The molecules are stacked in columns (with a tendency to dimerization) which are separated by anions. Typical anions are, for example, octahedral PF_{6}, AsF_{6} or tetrahedral ClO_{4} or ReO_{4}.

Both material classes are quasi-one-dimensional at room-temperature, only conducting along the molecule stacks, and share a very rich phase diagram containing antiferromagnetic ordering, charge order, spin-density wave state, dimensional crossover and superconductivity.

Only one Bechgaard salt was found to be superconducting at ambient pressure which is (TMTTF)_{2}ClO_{4} with a transition temperature of T_{c} = 1.4 K (−271.8 °C; −457.1 °F). Several other salts become superconducting only under external pressure. The external pressure required to drive most Fabre-salts to superconductivity is so high, that under lab conditions superconductivity was observed only in one compound. A selection of the transition temperature and corresponding external pressure of several one-dimensional organic superconductors is shown in the table below.

Material	T_{c} (K)	p_{ext} (kbar)
(TMTSF)_{2}SbF_{6}	0.36	10.5
(TMTSF)_{2}PF_{6}	1.1	6.5
(TMTSF)_{2}AsF_{6}	1.1	9.5
(TMTSF)_{2}ReO_{4}	1.2	9.5
(TMTSF)_{2}TaF_{6}	1.35	11
(TMTTF)_{2}Br	0.8	26

== Two-dimensional (BEDT-TTF)_{2}X ==
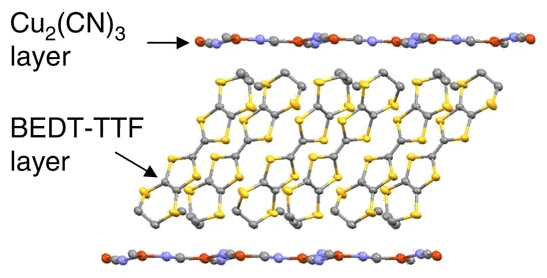
The layered structure of ET_{2}X salts illustrated by κ-(ET)_{2}Cu_{2}(CN)_{3}. The yellow, grey, blue and red ellipsoids represent the sulfur, carbon, nitrogen and copper atoms, respectively. The hydrogen atoms are omitted for clarity. Layers of ET donor molecules are separated by polymeric Cu_{2}(CN)_{3}^{−} anion sheets. κ-(ET)_{2}Cu_{2}(CN)_{3} is a semiconductor, but a very similar κ'-(ET)_{2}Cu_{2}(CN)_{3} polymorph is an ambient-pressure superconductor with T_{C} ~ 5 K.

BEDT-TTF is the short form of bisethylenedithio-tetrathiafulvalene commonly abbreviated with ET. These molecules form planes which are separated by anions. The pattern of the molecules in the planes is not unique but there are several different phases growing, depending on the anion and the growth conditions. Important phases concerning superconductivity are the α- and θ- phase with the molecules ordering in a fishbone structure and the β- and especially κ-phase which order in a checkerboard structure with molecules being dimerized in the κ-phase. This dimerization makes the κ-phases special as they are not quarter- but half-filled systems, driving them into superconductivity at higher temperatures compared to the other phases.

The amount of possible anions separating two sheets of ET-molecules is nearly infinite. There are simple anions such as triiodide (I^{−}_{3}), polymeric ones such as the very famous Cu[N(CN)_{2}]Br and anions containing solvents for example Ag(CF_{3})_{4}·112DCBE. The electronic properties of the ET-based crystals are determined by its growing phase, its anion and by the external pressure applied. The external pressure needed to drive an ET-salt with insulating ground state to a superconducting one is much less than those needed for Bechgaard salts. For example, κ-(ET)_{2}Cu[N(CN)_{2}]Cl needs only a pressure of about 300 bar (4,400 psi) to become superconducting, which can be achieved by placing a crystal in grease frozen below 0 °C (32 °F) and then providing sufficient stress to induce the superconducting transition. The crystals are very sensitive, which can be observed impressively in α-(ET)_{2}I_{3} lying several hours in the sun (or more controlled in an oven at 40 °C, 104 °F). After this treatment one gets α_{Tempered}-(ET)_{2}I_{3} which is superconducting.

In contrast to the Fabre or Bechgaard salts universal phase diagrams for all the ET-based salts have only been proposed yet. Such a phase diagram would depend not only on temperature and pressure (i.e. bandwidth), but also on electronic correlations. In addition to the superconducting ground state these materials show charge-order, antiferromagnetism or remain metallic down to lowest temperatures. One compound is even predicted to be a spin liquid.

The highest transition temperatures at ambient pressure and with external pressure are both found in κ-phases with very similar anions. κ-(ET)_{2}Cu[N(CN)_{2}]Br becomes superconducting at T_{c} = 11.8 K (−261.3 °C; −438.4 °F) at ambient pressure, and a pressure of 300 bar drives deuterated κ-(ET)_{2}Cu[N(CN)_{2}]Cl from an antiferromagnetic to a superconducting ground state with a transition temperature of T_{C} = 13.1 K (−260.0 °C; −436.1 °F). The following table shows only a few exemplary superconductors of this class. For more superconductors, see Lebed (2008) in the references.

Material	T_{c} (K)	p_{ext} (kbar)
β_{H}-(ET)_{2}I_{3}	1.5	0
θ-(ET)_{2}I_{3}	3.6	0
k-(ET)_{2}I_{3}	3.6	0
α-(ET)_{2}KHg(SCN)_{4}	0.3	0
α-(ET)_{2}KHg(SCN)_{4}	1.2	1.2
β’’-(ET)_{2}SF_{5}CH_{2}CF_{2}SO_{3}	5.3	0
κ-(ET)_{2}Cu[N(CN)_{2}]Cl	12.8	0.3
κ-(ET)_{2}Cu[N(CN)_{2}]Cl deuterated	13.1	0.3
κ-(ET)_{2}Cu[N(CN)_{2}]Br deuterated	11.2	0
κ-(ET)_{2}Cu(NCS)_{2}	10.4	0
κ-(ET)_{4}Hg_{2.89}Cl_{8}	1.8	12
κ_{H}-(ET)_{2}Cu(CF_{3})_{4}·TCE	9.2	0
κ_{H}-(ET)_{2}Ag(CF_{3})_{4}·TCE	11.1	0

Even more superconductors can be found by changing the ET-molecules slightly either by replacing the sulfur atoms by selenium (BEDT-TSF, BETS) or by oxygen (BEDO-TTF, BEDO).

Some two-dimensional organic superconductors of the κ-(ET)_{2}X and λ(BETS)_{2}X families are candidates for the Fulde-Ferrell-Larkin-Ovchinnikov (FFLO) phase when superconductivity is suppressed by an external magnetic field.

== Doped fullerenes ==
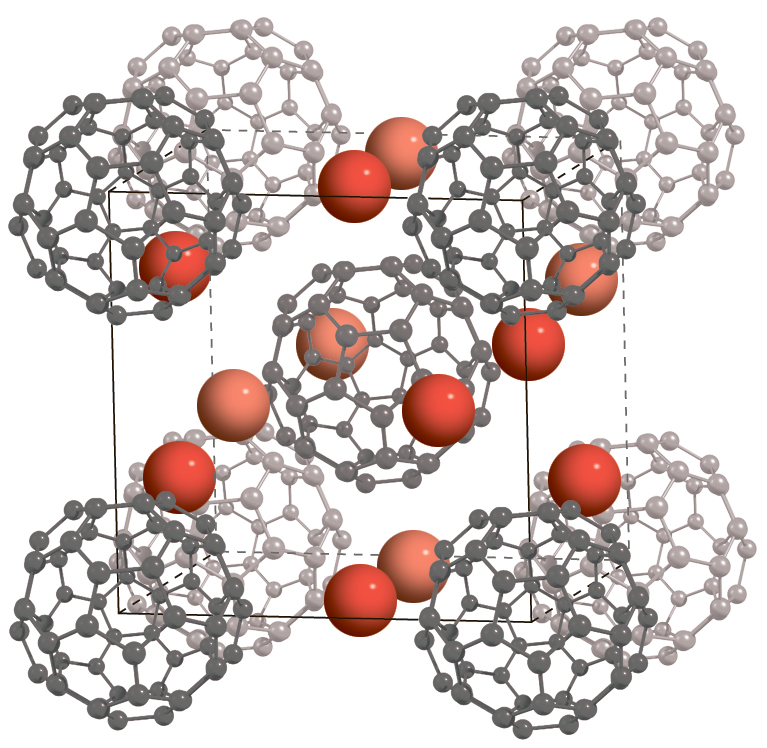
Structure of Cs_{3}C_{60}

Superconducting fullerenes based on C_{60} are fairly different from other organic superconductors. The building molecules are no longer manipulated hydrocarbons but pure carbon molecules. In addition these molecules are no longer flat but bulky which gives rise to a three-dimensional, isotropic superconductor. The pure C_{60} grows in an fcc-lattice and is an insulator. By placing alkali atoms in the interstitials the crystal becomes metallic and eventually superconducting at low temperatures.

Unfortunately C_{60} crystals are not stable at ambient atmosphere. They are grown and investigated in closed capsules, limiting the measurement techniques possible. The highest transition temperature measured so far was T_{c} = 33 K (−240.2 °C; −400.3 °F) for Cs_{2}RbC_{60}. The highest measured transition temperature of an organic superconductor was found in 1995 in Cs_{3}C_{60} pressurized with 15,000 bar (220,000 psi) to be T_{c} = 40 K (−233.2 °C; −387.7 °F). Under pressure this compound shows a unique behavior. Usually the highest T_{C} is achieved with the lowest pressure necessary to drive the transition. Further increase of the pressure usually reduces the transition temperature. However, in Cs_{3}C_{60} superconductivity sets in at very low pressures of several 100 bar, and the transition temperature keeps increasing with increasing pressure. This indicates a completely different mechanism than just broadening of the bandwidth.

Material	T_{c} (K)	p_{ext} (mbar)
K_{3}C_{60}	18	0
Rb_{3}C_{60}	30.7	0
K_{2}CsC_{60}	24	0
K_{2}RbC_{60}	21.5	0
K_{5}C_{60}	8.4	0
Sr_{6}C_{60}	6.8	0
(NH_{3})_{4}Na_{2}CsC_{60}	29.6	0
(NH_{3})K_{3}C_{60}	28	14.8

== More organic superconductors ==
Next to the three major classes of organic superconductors (SCs) there are more organic systems becoming superconducting at low temperatures or under pressure. A few examples follow.

=== TTP-based SCs ===
TMTTF as well as BEDT-TTF are based on the molecule TTF (tetrathiafulvalene). Using tetrathiapentalene (TTP) as basic molecules one receives a variety of new organic molecules serving as cations in organic crystals.

=== Phenanthrene-type SCs ===
Doping picene and phenanthrene with potassium and rubidium leads to superconductivity with transition temperatures up to 18 K (−255 °C; −427 °F).

=== Graphite intercalation SCs ===
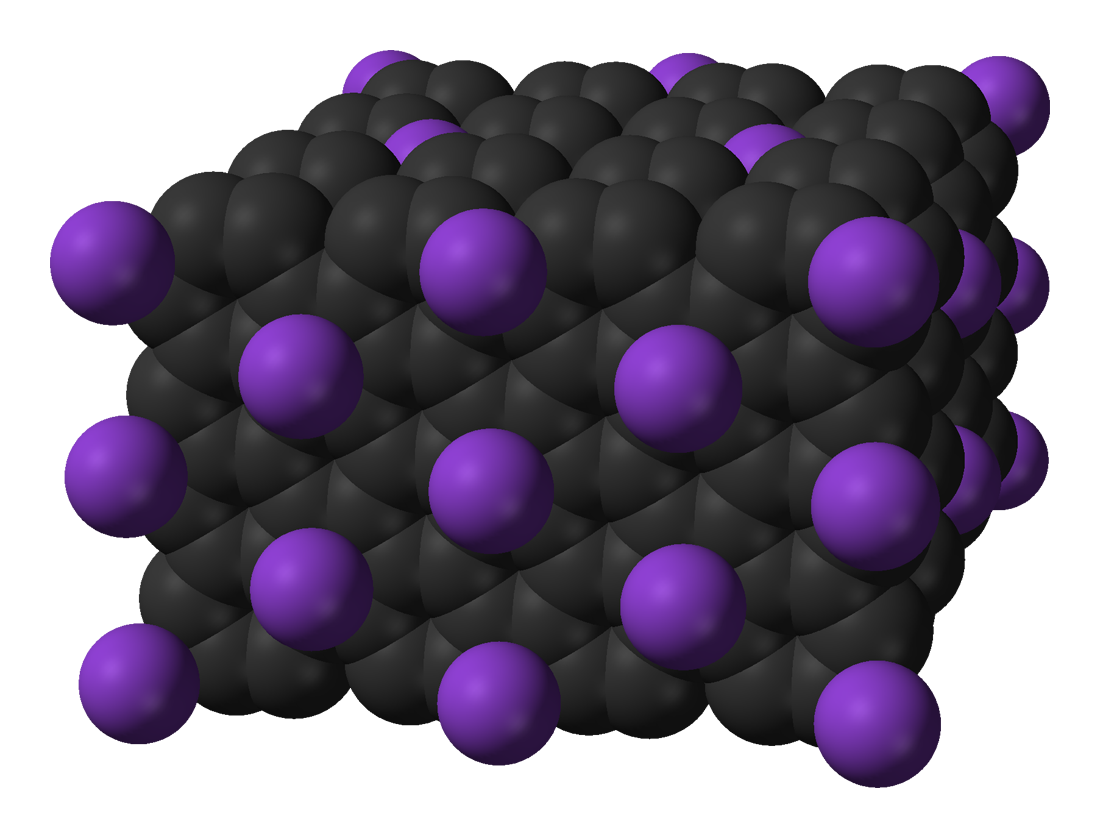
Crystal structure of KC_{8}

Material	T_{c} (K)
(BDA-TTP)_{2}AsF_{6}	5.8
(DTEDT)_{3}Au(CN)_{2}	4
K_{3.3}Picene	18
Rb_{3.1}Picene	6.9
K_{3}Phenanthrene	4.95
Rb_{3}Phenanthrene	4.75
CaC_{5}	11.5
NaC_{2}	5
KC_{8}	0.14
