= Tetrathiafulvalene =

Organosulfuric compound with formula C6H4S4

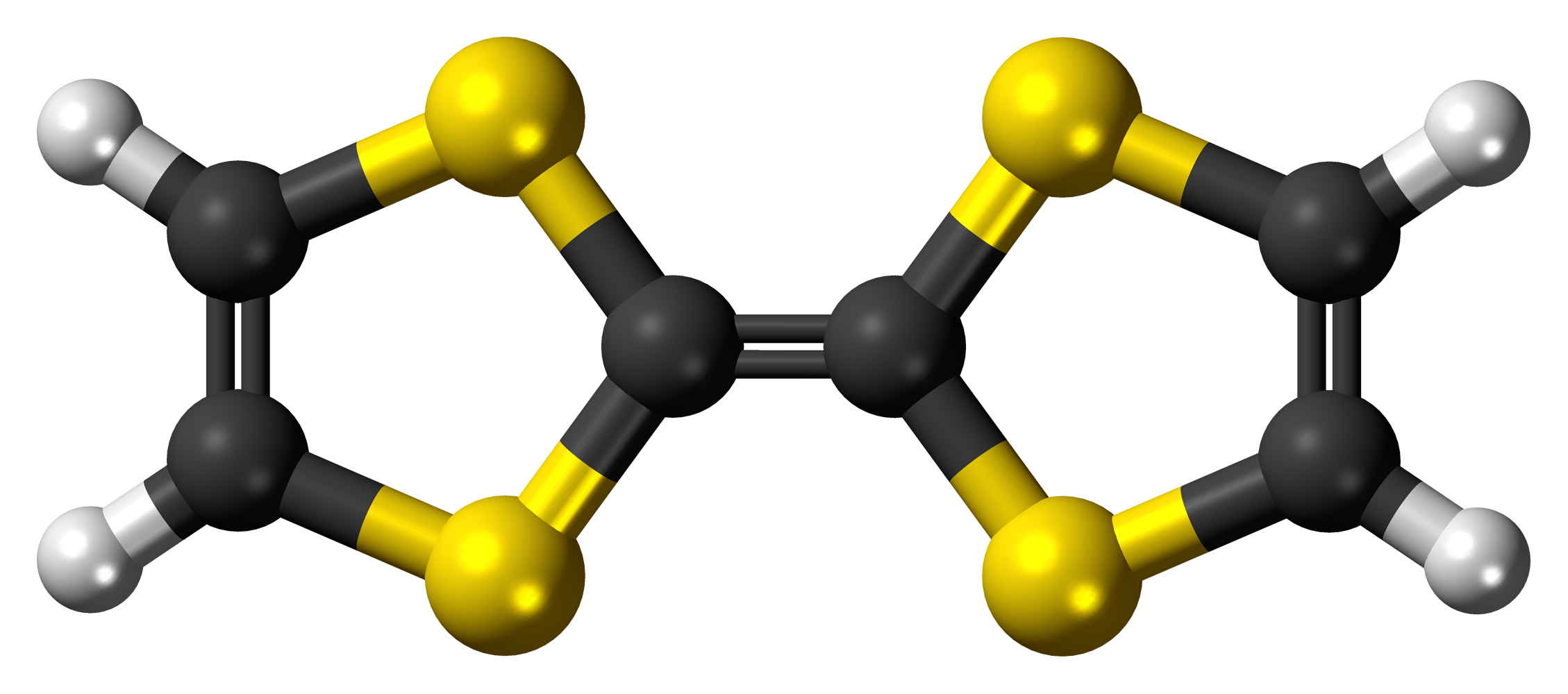

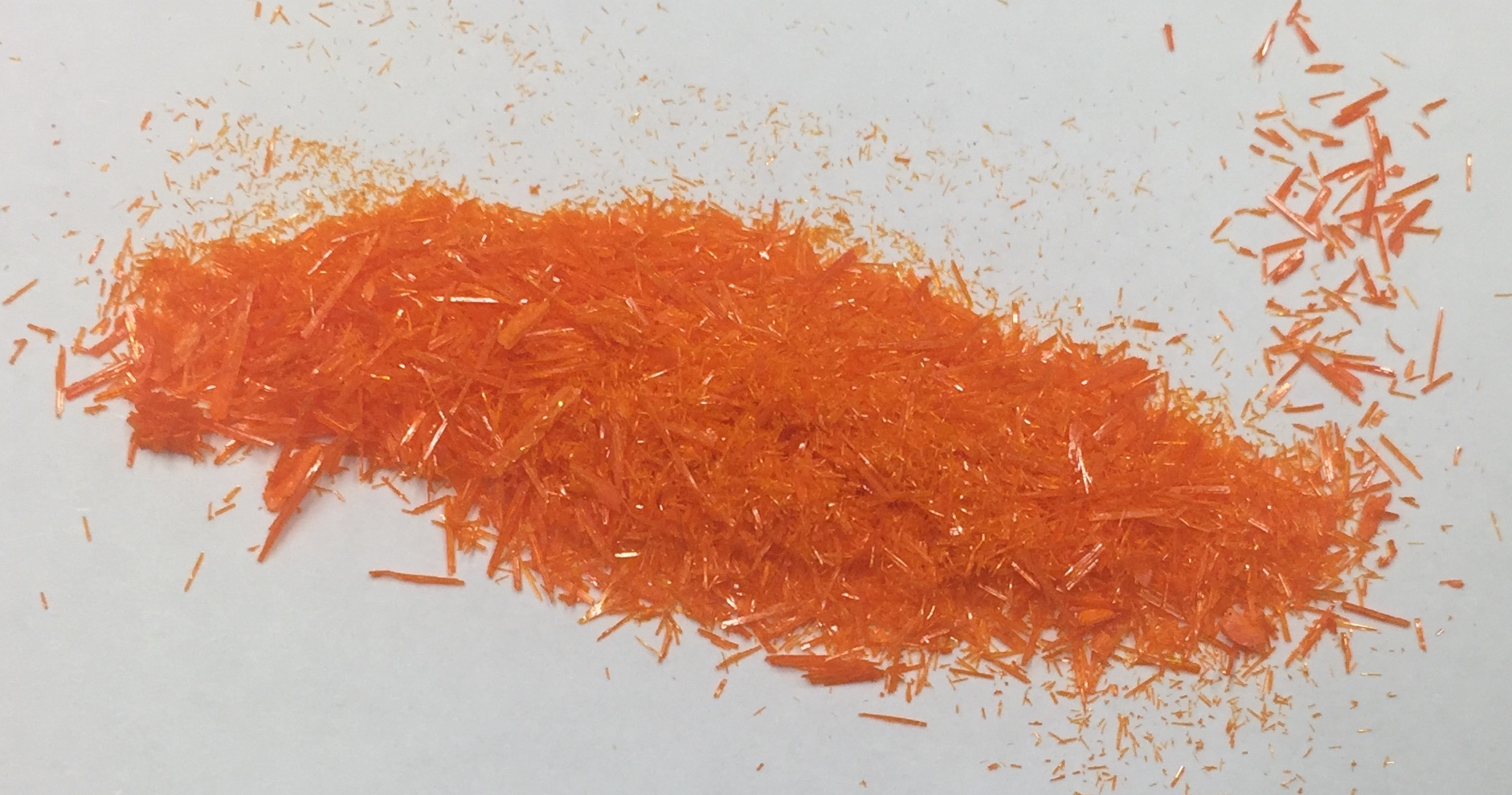

Names
- Preferred IUPAC name 2,2′-Bi(1,3-dithiolylidene)
- Other names Δ^{2,2′}-Bi-1,3-dithiole

Identifiers
CAS Number	31366-25-3
3D model (JSmol)	Interactive image
Beilstein Reference	1282106
ChEBI	CHEBI:52444
ChemSpider	89848
ECHA InfoCard	100.045.979
EC Number	250-593-7
PubChem CID	99451
UNII	HY1EN16W9T
CompTox Dashboard (EPA)	DTXSID6067620
- InChI: InChI=1S/C6H4S4/c1-2-8-5(7-1)6-9-3-4-10-6/h1-4H Key: FHCPAXDKURNIOZ-UHFFFAOYSA-N; InChI=1/C6H4S4/c1-2-8-5(7-1)6-9-3-4-10-6/h1-4H Key: FHCPAXDKURNIOZ-UHFFFAOYAZ
- SMILES: S1C=CSC1=C2SC=CS2

Properties
Chemical formula	C_{6}H_{4}S_{4}
Molar mass	204.34 g·mol^{−1}
Appearance	Yellow solid
Melting point	116 to 119 °C (241 to 246 °F; 389 to 392 K)
Boiling point	Decomposes
Solubility in water	Insoluble
Solubility in organic solvents	Soluble

Structure
Dipole moment	0 D

Hazards
- Occupational safety and health (OHS/OSH)
Main hazards	combustible
- GHS labelling
Pictograms	(GHS07: Exclamation mark)
Signal word	Warning
Hazard statements	H317
Precautionary statements	P261, P280, P302+P352, P333+P313, P363, P501

Related compounds
Related compounds	TCNQ; Thiophene; Bithiophene; Fulvalene; Tetracyanoethylene; Tetramethyltetraselenafulvalene
- Except where otherwise noted, data are given for materials in their standard state (at 25 °C [77 °F], 100 kPa). verify (what is ?) Infobox references

Tetrathiafulvalene (TTF) is an organosulfur compound with the formula H_{2}C_{2}S_{2}C=CS_{2}C_{2}H_{2}. It is the parent of many tetrathiafulvenes. Studies on these heterocyclic compound contributed to the development of molecular electronics, although no practical applications of TTF emerged. Over 10,000 scientific publications discuss TTF and its derivatives.

== Preparation ==
The high level of interest in TTFs spawned many syntheses of TTF and its analogues. Most preparations entail the coupling of cyclic C_{3}S_{2} building blocks such as 1,3-dithiole-2-thion or the related 1,3-dithiole-2-ones. For TTF itself, the synthesis begins with the cyclic trithiocarbonate H_{2}C_{2}S_{2}C=S (1,3-dithiole-2-thione), which is S-methylated and then reduced to give H_{2}C_{2}S_{2}CH(SCH_{3}) (1,3-dithiole-2-yl methyl thioether), which is treated as follows:

Protonolysis of a thioether:

H_{2}C_{2}S_{2}CH(SCH_{3}) + HBF_{4} → [H_{2}C_{2}S_{2}CH]^{+}BF^{−}_{4} + CH_{3}SH

Followed by deprotonation of the dithiolium cation with triethylamine:

2 [H_{2}C_{2}S_{2}CH]^{+}BF^{−}_{4} + 2 N(CH_{2}CH_{3})_{3} → H_{2}C_{2}S_{2}C=CS_{2}C_{2}H_{2} + 2 [NH(CH_{2}CH_{3})_{3}]^{+}BF^{−}_{4}

== Redox properties ==
Bulk TTF itself has unremarkable electrical properties. Distinctive properties are, however, associated with salts of its oxidized derivatives, such as salts derived from TTF^{+}.

The high electrical conductivity of TTF salts can be attributed to the following features of TTF:

- its planarity, which allows π-π stacking of its oxidized derivatives,
- its high symmetry, which promotes charge delocalization, thereby minimizing coulombic repulsions, and
- its ability to undergo oxidation at mild potentials to give a stable radical cation. Electrochemical measurements show that TTF can be oxidized twice reversibly:

TTF → TTF^{+} + e^{−} (E = 0.34 V)
TTF^{+} → TTF^{2+} + e^{−} (E = 0.78 V, vs. Ag/AgCl in CH_{3}CN solution)

Each dithiolylidene ring in TTF has 7π electrons: 2 for each sulfur atom, 1 for each sp^{2} carbon atom. Thus, oxidation converts each ring to an aromatic 6π-electron configuration, consequently leaving the central double bond essentially a single bond, as all π-electrons occupy ring orbitals.

== History ==
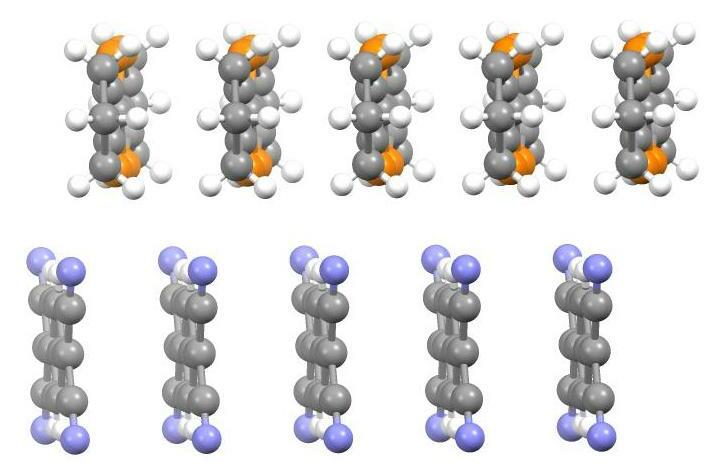
Edge-on view of portion of crystal structure of hexamethyleneTTF/TCNQ charge transfer salt, highlighting the segregated stacking.

The salt [TTF^{+}]Cl^{−} was reported to be a semiconductor in 1972. Subsequently, the charge-transfer salt [TTF]TCNQ was shown to be a narrow band gap semiconductor. X-ray diffraction studies of [TTF][TCNQ] revealed stacks of partially oxidized TTF molecules adjacent to anionic stacks of TCNQ molecules. This "segregated stack" motif was unexpected and is responsible for the distinctive electrical properties, i.e. high and anisotropic electrical conductivity. Since these early discoveries, numerous analogues of TTF have been prepared. Well studied analogues include tetramethyltetrathiafulvalene (TMTTF), tetramethyltetraselenafulvalene (TMTSF), and bis(ethylenedithio)tetrathiafulvalene (BEDT-TTF, CAS [66946-48-3]). Several tetramethyltetrathiafulvalene salts (called Fabre salts) are of some relevance as organic superconductors.

== See also ==
- Bechgaard salt
