= Charge-transfer complex =

Assembly of molecules or ions

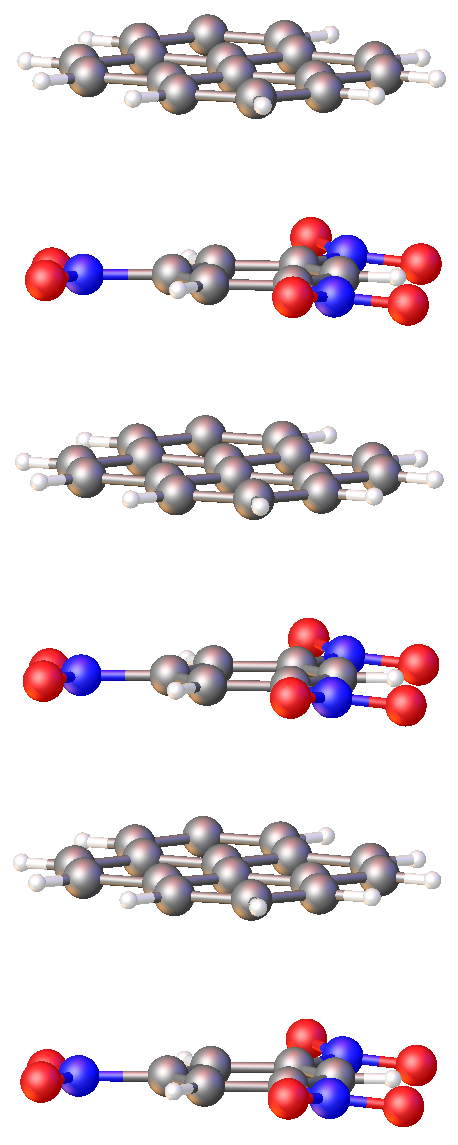
Structure of one part of one stack of the charge-transfer complex between pyrene and 1,3,5-trinitrobenzene.

In chemistry, charge-transfer (CT) complex, or electron donor-acceptor complex, describes a type of supramolecular assembly of two or more molecules or ions. The assembly consists of two molecules that self-attract through electrostatic forces, i.e., one has at least partial negative charge and the partner has partial positive charge, referred to respectively as the electron acceptor and electron donor. In some cases, the degree of charge transfer is "complete", such that the CT complex can be classified as a salt. In other cases, the charge-transfer association is weak, and the interaction can be disrupted easily by polar solvents.

== Examples ==
=== Electron donor-acceptor complexes ===
A number of organic compounds form charge-transfer complex, which are often described as electron-donor-acceptor complexes (EDA complexes). Typical acceptors are nitrobenzenes or tetracyanoethylene (TCNE). The strength of their interaction with electron donors correlates with the ionization potentials of the components. For TCNE, the stability constants (L/mol) for its complexes with benzene derivatives correlates with the number of methyl groups: benzene (0.128), 1,3,5-trimethylbenzene (1.11), 1,2,4,5-tetramethylbenzene (3.4), and hexamethylbenzene (16.8). A simple example for a prototypical electron-donor-acceptor complexes is nitroaniline.

1,3,5-Trinitrobenzene and related polynitrated aromatic compounds, being electron-deficient, form charge-transfer complexes with many arenes. Such complexes form upon crystallization, but often dissociate in solution to the components. Characteristically, these CT salts crystallize in stacks of alternating donor and acceptor (nitro aromatic) molecules, i.e. A-B-A-B.

=== Dihalogen/interhalogen CT complexes ===
Early studies on donor-acceptor complexes focused on the solvatochromism exhibited by iodine, which often results from I_{2} forming adducts with electron donors such as amines and ethers. Dihalogens X_{2} (X = Cl, Br, I) and interhalogens XY(X = I; Y = Cl, Br) are Lewis acid species capable of forming a variety of products when reacted with donor species. Among these species (including oxidation or protonated products), CT adducts D·XY have been largely investigated. The CT interaction has been quantified and is the basis of many schemes for parameterizing donor and acceptor properties, such as those devised by Gutmann, Childs, Beckett, and the ECW model.

Many organic species featuring chalcogen or pnictogen donor atoms form CT salts. The nature of the resulting adducts can be investigated both in solution and in the solid state.

In solution, the intensity of charge-transfer bands in the UV-Vis absorbance spectrum is strongly dependent upon the degree (equilibrium constant) of this association reaction. Methods have been developed to determine the equilibrium constant for these complexes in solution by measuring the intensity of absorption bands as a function of the concentration of donor and acceptor components in solution. The Benesi-Hildebrand method, named for its developers, was first described for the association of iodine dissolved in aromatic hydrocarbons.

In the solid state a valuable parameter is the elongation of the X–X or X–Y bond length, resulting from the antibonding nature of the σ* LUMO. The elongation can be evaluated by means of structural determinations (XRD) and FT-Raman spectroscopy.

A well-known example is the complex formed by iodine when combined with starch, which exhibits an intense purple charge-transfer band. This has widespread use as a rough screen for counterfeit currency. Unlike most paper, the paper used in US currency is not sized with starch. Thus, formation of this purple color on application of an iodine solution indicates a counterfeit.

=== TTF-TCNQ: prototype for electrically conducting complexes ===
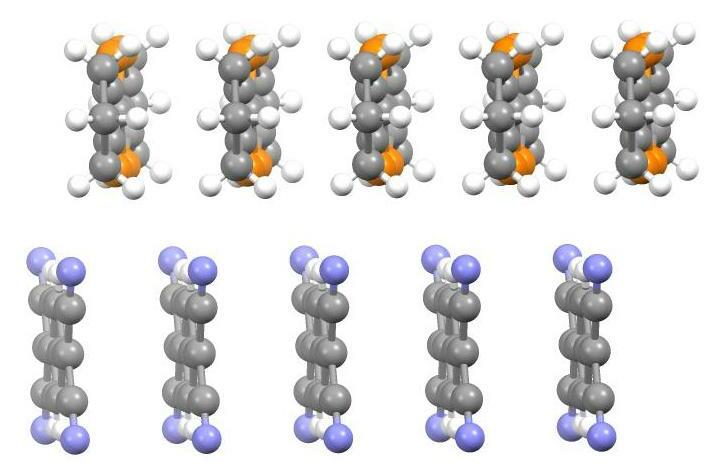
Edge-on view of portion of crystal structure of hexamethyleneTTF/TCNQ charge transfer salt, highlighting the segregated stacking.

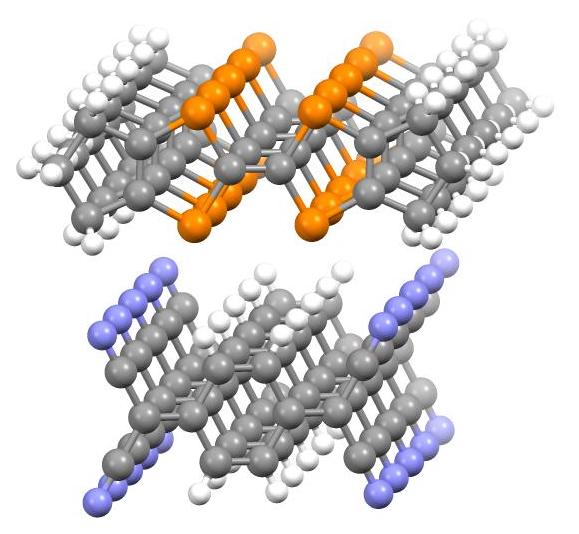
End-on view of portion of crystal structure of hexamethyleneTTF/TCNQ charge transfer salt. The distance between the TTF planes is 3.55 Å.

In 1954, charge-transfer salts derived from perylene with iodine or bromine were reported with resistivities as low as 8 ohm·cm. In 1973, it was discovered that a combination of tetracyanoquinodimethane (TCNQ) and tetrathiafulvalene (TTF) forms a strong charge-transfer complex referred to as TTF-TCNQ. The solid shows almost metallic electrical conductance and was the first-discovered purely organic conductor. In a TTF-TCNQ crystal, TTF and TCNQ molecules are arranged independently in separate parallel-aligned stacks, and an electron transfer occurs from donor (TTF) to acceptor (TCNQ) stacks. Hence, electrons and electron holes are separated and concentrated in the stacks and can traverse in a one-dimensional direction along the TCNQ and TTF columns, respectively, when an electric potential is applied to the ends of a crystal in the stack direction.

Superconductivity is exhibited by tetramethyl-tetraselenafulvalene-hexafluorophosphate (TMTSF_{2}PF_{6}), which is a semi-conductor at ambient conditions, shows superconductivity at low temperature (critical temperature) and high pressure: 0.9 K and 12 kbar. Critical current densities in these complexes are very small.

== Mechanistic implications ==
Many reactions involving nucleophiles attacking electrophiles can be usefully assessed from the perspective of an incipient charge-transfer complex. Examples include electrophilic aromatic substitution, the addition of Grignard reagents to ketones, and brominolysis of metal-alkyl bonds.

== Electronic structure ==
The electronic structure of a charge-transfer (CT) complex is a result of the electronic coupling between an electron donor (D) and an electron acceptor (A), in which partial or complete redistribution of electronic charge can take place. Unlike isolated molecules, CT complexes are typically characterized by electronic wavefunctions that are mixtures of neutral and ionic structures rather than those of individual molecules. The electronic ground and excited states of a CT complex may be characterized via two limiting diabatic structures: a neutral one, $|D^0A^0\rangle$, and an ionic one, $|D^+A^-\rangle$, associated with electron transfer between the donor and acceptor. The actual electronic ground and excited states are linear combinations of these structures. Observable effects including the permanent dipole moment, optical absorption intensity, and degree of charge separation are thus dependent on the contribution of the ionic part to these states.

A traditional theoretical representation of the CT complex can be described via a two-state Hamiltonian, expressed in the basis of neutral and ionic diabatic configurations,
$$\hat{H}=
\begin{pmatrix}
E_N & V_{DA} \\
V_{DA} & E_I
\end{pmatrix}$$

where $E_N$ and $E_I$ are the diabatic energies of the neutral and ionic states, respectively, and $V_{DA}$ indicates the donor–acceptor electronic coupling. The diagonalized form of this Hamiltonian gives adiabatic electronic states, whose energies and charge-transfer character depend on both the energy separation of the diabatic states and the strength of the donor–acceptor coupling.

A molecular orbital description of charge transfer is usually used, in which the donor and acceptor frontier molecular orbitals dominate the interaction. The HOMO of the donor and the LUMO of the acceptor generally govern the CT interaction. Optical excitation corresponding to a CT transition can be considered as promotion of an electron from the donor HOMO to the acceptor LUMO, resulting in increased electronic charge separation and a large transition dipole moment.

The energy difference between neutral and ionic diabatic structures is governed by key electronic parameters including the donor ionization potential, acceptor electron affinity, and the Coulomb interaction between the resultant charges. Together, these quantities dictate the thermodynamic driving force for charge transfer and the resulting equilibrium degree of ionicity of the CT complex.

Charge-transfer absorption bands arise from electronic transitions between mixed neutral and ionic states and are distinct from local excitations of the individual donor or acceptor molecules. These CT absorption bands are determined by both the diabatic energy splitting and the electronic coupling strength, and are typically analyzed using the Mulliken–Hush approach.

The environment of CT complexes has a strong influence on their electronic structure. Increased solvation stabilizes the ionic configuration relative to the neutral state and often enhances charge separation, shifting CT absorption bands to lower energies. Differences in donor–acceptor distance and mutual orientation similarly influence the electronic coupling and the observed magnitude of charge transfer.

== See also ==
- Exciplex – a special case where one of the molecules is in an excited state
- Organic semiconductor
- Organic superconductor

== Historical sources ==
- Y. Okamoto and W. Brenner Organic Semiconductors, Rheinhold (1964)
- H. Akamatsu; H. Inokuchi; Y. Matsunaga (1954). "Electrical Conductivity of the Perylene–Bromine Complex". Nature. 173 (4395): 168–169. Bibcode:1954Natur.173..168A. doi:10.1038/173168a0. S2CID 4275335.
