= Donal Bradley =

British physicist (born 1962)

Donal Bradley CBE FRS FInstP FIET FRSA
- Born: Donal Donat Conor Bradley; 3 January 1962 (age 64)
- Education: Wimbledon College; Imperial College London (BSc); University of Cambridge (PhD)
- Awards: Faraday Medal (2010); Royal Society Bakerian Medal (2010); Michael Faraday Medal and Prize (2009)
- Scientific career
- Fields: Soluble Semiconductors; Plastic electronics Molecular electronics
- Workplaces: University of Cambridge; University of Sheffield; University of Oxford; Imperial College London; King Abdullah University of Science and Technology
- Thesis: Spectroscopic investigations of the processible conjugated polymers poly(P-phenylene vinylene) and poly(4,4'-diphenylene diphenyl vinylene) (1987)
- Website: www.kaust.edu.sa/en/study/faculty/donal-d-c-bradley

Donal Donat Conor Bradley is a British physicist who is the Vice President for Research at King Abdullah University of Science and Technology (KAUST), Saudi Arabia. From 2015 until 2019, he was head of the Mathematical, Physical and Life Sciences Division of the University of Oxford and a Professor of Engineering Science and Physics at Jesus College, Oxford. From 2006 to 2015, he was the Lee-Lucas Professor of Experimental Physics at Imperial College London. He was the founding director of the Centre for Plastic Electronics and served as vice-provost for research at the college.

Bradley is known for his contributions to the development of molecular electronic materials and devices. Plastic or printed electronics, as this technology is widely known, embodies a paradigm shift towards low temperature, solution-based device fabrication with applications in energy efficient displays and lighting, photovoltaic energy generation, medical diagnostics and longer term potential for optical communications.

== Education ==
Bradley was a pupil and latterly Head Boy at the Jesuit Wimbledon College in the London Borough of Merton. He studied as an undergraduate student (BSc Physics) at Imperial College London between 1980 and 1983 and obtained a first class honours degree and Associateship of the Royal College of Science. He was awarded the Royal Society for the Encouragement of Arts, Manufactures and Commerce Silver Medal and fellowship (FRSA) as an outstanding graduate of the Royal College of Science and served in his second year as the Royal College of Science Union Departmental Representative for Physics. His postgraduate research was undertaken in the Physics and Chemistry of Solids Group at the Cavendish Laboratory, University of Cambridge, and he received a PhD in 1987.

== Career and research ==
After completing his PhD in 1987 he was briefly a postdoctoral research associate funded by British Petroleum before being simultaneously awarded the Unilever Research Fellowship in Chemical Physics at Corpus Christi College, Cambridge (held 1987 – 1989), and a Toshiba Research Fellowship to work at the Toshiba Corporation Research and Development Center's Chemical Laboratory in Kawasaki, Japan (held 1987–88).

Upon returning to Corpus Christi College, Cambridge, after a year spent in Japan studying the nonlinear optical properties of poly(arylenevinylene) polymers, he played a central role in the February 1989 discovery of conjugated polymer electroluminescence, suggesting the experiment that led to Jeremy Henley Burroughes' first observation of light emission. Together with Jeremy Burroughes he undertook the initial characterisation of the basic properties of poly(p-phenylenevinylene) light emitting diodes, demonstrating that the light emission phenomenon was injection electroluminescence and that the frequency response was sufficiently fast to permit video display applications. Recognizing the importance of their discovery Bradley and Burroughes decided that it should be patented and together with Richard Friend filed a GB patent (PCT/GB90.00584) with first claim:

An electroluminescent device comprising a semiconductor layer in the form of a thin dense polymer film comprising at least one conjugated polymer;
a first contact layer which is selected so that on application of an electric field to said device charge carriers of a first type are injected into the semiconductor layer; and a second contact layer which is selected so that on application of an electric field to said device charge carriers of a second type are injected into the semiconductor layers, wherein the polymer film of the semiconductor layer has sufficiently low concentration of extrinsic charge carriers that on applying an electric field between the first and second contact layers across the semiconductor layer as to render the second contact layer positive relative to the first contact layer charge carriers of said first and second types are injected into the semiconductor layer and combine to form in the conjugated polymer charge carrier pairs which decay radiatively so that radiation is emitted from the conjugated polymer.

Bradley was the corresponding author for the subsequent 1990 Nature paper reporting the discovery of conjugated polymer electroluminescence. This paper rapidly became the most highly cited paper in the field of molecular electronic materials and devices – a position that it holds to this day – and it triggered an explosion of activity around the world, thereby launching the new field of plastic electronics.

Bradley is an Institute for Scientific Information highly cited author in both Materials Science and Physics with 563 papers published to date. His h-index in January 2019 is 109 and his publications have been cited a combined total of 59,482 times (ISI Web of Science).

Bradley joined the University of Oxford in 2015 as Head of the Mathematical, Physical and Life Sciences Division and Professor of Physics and Engineering Science. He is a Professorial Fellow of Jesus College.

Bradley was one of the 21 members of Oxford congress who stood to oppose the debate on the university's response to a changes proposed to the Universities Superannuation Scheme (USS) in March 2018.

On 7 April 2019 Bradley joined King Abdullah University of Science and Technology (KAUST) as the Vice President for Research.

== Awards and prizes ==
Bradley's research has been recognised by:

- the Founders Prize of the combined Institute of Physics, Royal Society of Chemistry and Institute of Materials, Minerals and Mining, Polymer Physics Group (2013)
- the Institution of Engineering and Technology Faraday Medal (2010),
- the Institute of Physics Faraday Medal (2009),
- the Royal Society Brian Mercer Award for Innovation (2007),
- the Imperial College London Research Excellence Award (2006),
- the European Science Foundation European Latsis Prize for Nanoengineering (2005),
- the Society for Information Display Jan Rajchman Prize (2005),
- the European Union Descartes Prize (2003) for "Polymer Light-Emitting Diodes for displays (PLEDD)"
- and a Daiwa Award (1994).

He was also the recipient of the Royal Society for the Encouragement of Arts, Manufactures and Commerce Silver Medal in 1983 as an outstanding graduate of the Royal College of Science. He was elected a fellow of the Royal Society for the Encouragement of Arts, Manufactures and Commerce (FRSA) in 1983, a Fellow of the Royal Society (FRS) in 2004, a fellow of the Institute of Physics (FInstP) in 2005 and a fellow of the Institution of Engineering and Technology (FIET) in 2013.

In the New Year Honours 2010 Bradley was appointed as a Commander of the Most Excellent Order of the British Empire (CBE) by the Queen for services to science.

=== Named lectures ===
Bradley delivered the first Nanjing Tech Global Vision Lecture (annual distinguished lecture) on "Molecular Control for Plastic Electronics and Photonics" in July 2013.

In February 2011 he delivered the Distinguished Lecture in Physics on "Molecular Control for Conjugated Polymer Optics and Photonics" at Hong Kong Baptist University.

in March 2010, he delivered the Royal Society Bakerian Lecture on "Plastic Electronics: their science and applications”.

In December 2009 he delivered the Institute of Physics Mott Lecture on "Plastic Electronics – The Science and Application of Molecular Electronic Materials and Devices" .

In November of the same year he delivered the Hong Kong Polytechnic University Chau Wai-yin Memorial Lecture "Twenty Years of Plastic Electronics – The Science and Application of Molecular Electronic Materials" and in October the University of Liverpool Frolich Lecture "The Science and Application of Molecular Electronic Materials and Devices".

In 2005 Bradley delivered the European Science Foundation European Latsis Prize Lecture "Nano-Engineering a Molecular Electronic Future" at the European Parliament building in Strasbourg, France, the Institute of Physics Ireland Lecture Series (at Trinity College, Dublin, University College Cork and University College Galway) "Organic Electronics: A Molecular Vision” and in 2004 the Weissberger-Williams Lecture (same title) at the Eastman Kodak Company's R&D Laboratories in Rochester, New York (USA).

=== Other honours ===
Bradley has been ranked since 2002 by the Institute for Scientific Information as one of the 1% most highly cited physicists in the world for research published over the past two decades. Additionally he has been ranked since 2010 as one of the 1% most highly cited materials scientists in the world for research published over the past two decades.

He is also ranked by the Institute for Scientific Information as one of the top 100 materials scientists in the world on the basis of the impact (citations per paper) of his journal papers published between 2000 and 2010.

== Other activities ==
- Co-inventor of conjugated polymer electroluminescence (1989) and co-founder of Cambridge Display Technology Ltd (1992)
- 1989 – 1993 University assistant lecturer in physics, University of Cambridge
- 1989 – 1993 College lecturer and director of studies (1992–93) in physics and fellow, Churchill College, Cambridge
- 1993 – 2000 Reader then professor (1995–2000) in the Department of Physics, University of Sheffield. Bradley founded the Electronic and Photonic Molecular Materials group at Sheffield and held the Royal Society Amersham International Senior Research Fellowship (1996–97) and the Leverhulme Trust Research Fellowship (1997–98).
- 1994 – 1999 Warden of Tapton Hall of Residence, University of Sheffield
- 1994 – 2000 Co-director then director of the Centre for Molecular Materials, University of Sheffield
- 2000 – 2006 The Professor of Experimental Physics, Blackett Laboratory, Imperial College London
- 2001 – 2005 Head of the Experimental Solid State Physics Group, Blackett Laboratory, Imperial College London
- 2001– 2012 Co-founder and director of Molecular Vision Ltd
- 2005 – 2008 Head of the Department of Physics, Blackett Laboratory, Imperial College London
- 2008 – 2009 Specialist adviser to the UK House of Commons Innovation, Universities, Science and Skills Committee Report on "Engineering: turning ideas into reality”
- 2008 Member of Research Councils UK Review of UK Physics
- 2009 – 2011 Deputy principal of the Faculty of Natural Sciences, Imperial College London
- 2009 – Director of the Solar Press (UK) Ltd
- 2010 – Member then chair (since 2013) of the Rank Prize Funds Optoelectronics Committee
- 2011 – 2013 Pro-rector for research, Imperial College London
- 2011 – Member of sub-panel 9: Physics for the 2014 Research Excellence Framework (REF) quality assessment exercise
- 2012 – Chief international academic advisor, Faculty of Science, Harbin Institute of Technology, China
- 2012 – Adjunct chair professor, Department of Physics and Institute of Advanced Materials, Hong Kong Baptist University
- 2013 – Trustee of the Rank Prize Funds
- 2013 – Honorary professor, Nanjing Tech University
- 2013 – Vice-provost for research, Imperial College London
- 2019 – Vice President for Research (VPR) and Distinguished Professor of Materials Physics and Device Engineering, King Abdulah university of science and Technology (KAUST) Saudi Arabia

== Personal life ==
Bradley's father was the noted professor and laser physicist Daniel Joseph Bradley.
