= Andrew Holmes (chemist) =

Australian and British research chemist and professor

Andrew Holmes AC FRS FAA
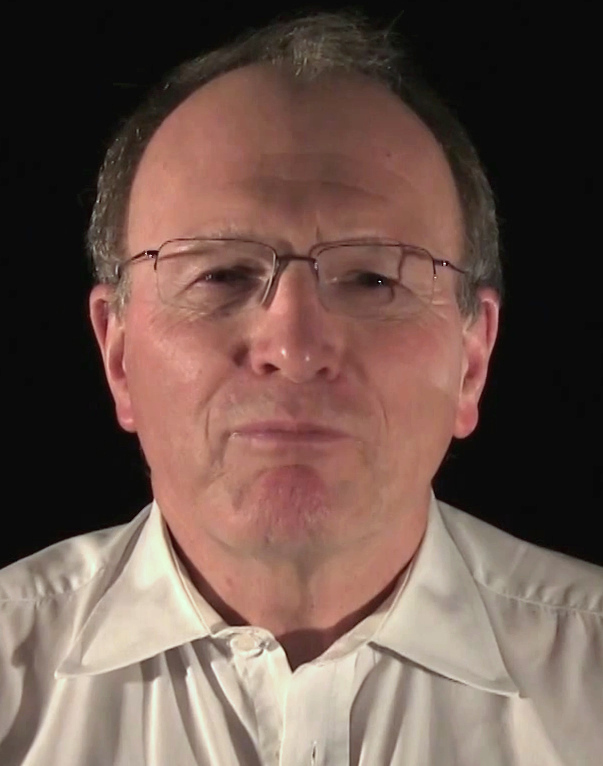
- Holmes in 2015
- Born: Andrew Bruce Holmes; 5 September 1943 (age 82); Melbourne, Australia
- Education: University of Melbourne (BSc); University College London (PhD)
- Known for: Natural product synthesis, Organic electronics
- Awards: Royal Medal (2012); Fellow of the Royal Society; Elected Fellow, Foreign Secretary, and then President, Australian Academy of Science; Descartes Prize (2003); Honorary Doctorate, Hasselt University, Belgium; Honorary Fellow, University College London; CSIRO Fellow; Member of the Order of Australia
- Scientific career
- Fields: Organic Chemistry
- Workplaces: CSIRO; University of Melbourne; Imperial College London; University of Cambridge
- Doctoral advisor: Franz Sondheimer
- Other academic advisors: Albert Eschenmoser (postdoc)
- Doctoral students: Christine Luscombe
- Other notable students: Andrew Ian Cooper (postdoc); Stuart Conway (postdoc)

Andrew Bruce Holmes (born 5 September 1943) is an Australian and British senior research chemist and professor at the Bio21 Institute, Melbourne, Australia, and the past President of the Australian Academy of Science. His research interests lie in the synthesis of biologically-active natural products (spanning therapeutic materials to new biotechnological probes) and optoelectronic polymers (with applications to electroluminescent flexible displays and organic solar cells).

== Education ==
Holmes' undergraduate studies and masters' research were conducted at the University of Melbourne where he was resident at Ormond College. Travelling to the UK on a Shell Overseas Science Scholarship, he performed his PhD work at University College London under the supervision of Franz Sondheimer.

== Career and research ==
As a postdoctoral researcher, Holmes worked on the total synthesis of Vitamin B_{12} with Albert Eschenmoser. In 1972 he was appointed as a demonstrator to the University of Cambridge where he stayed for 32 years, ultimately as Professor of Organic and Polymer Chemistry, and Director of the Melville Laboratory for Polymer Synthesis where he oversaw the founding and initial decade of the Melville Laboratory.

Holmes' early work at Cambridge expanded his interest in new techniques for synthesising small molecules that are biologically-active and practically-useful, including natural products (such as alkaloids) and peptidomimetics. In 1989, Chloe Jennings-White - a PhD student in Holmes' laboratory - was attempting to synthesise a molecule isolated from seaweed when the crystals she had prepared spontaneously formed into a long molecular chain. Jennings-White observed that this novel substance then turned a metallic blue-black colour while sitting on the bench in the lab, and showed properties of polarization. Subsequent characterization of the conductive polymer revealed that the polymer emitted light when a current was passed through it. An intensive period of research in Holmes' group, and other polymer chemistry groups, led to the discovery of differently-coloured light-emitting polymers that spanned the visible spectrum. A subsequent collaboration with physicist Richard Friend and co-workers at Cambridge's Cavendish Laboratory revealed the potential of these conjugated polymers for applications such as organic LEDs and rollable displays. Friend and Holmes co-founded the company Cambridge Display Technology for commercial exploitation of these materials – an early success story of Silicon Fen.

In 2004 Holmes returned to his native Australia on a Federation Fellowship, to lead a group at the newly established Bio21 Institute. He has pursued the application of photovoltaic polymers to solar energy, and was instrumental in forming the Victorian Organic Solar Cell Consortium. He has also continued to develop new syntheses of novel, biologically-useful materials. An example is his groups' synthesis of phosphoinositides, amphiphilic phospholipids situated in the cell membrane, which collaborators at the Ludwig Institute for Cancer Research have used to probe the dynamics of signal transduction (intercellular signalling being an important component of many aspects of cell biology, including that of tumors).

Holmes has served on the editorial or advisory boards of numerous learned scientific journals, including Organic Letters, Chemical Communications and Angewandte Chemie. In 2006, his 1998 paper on electroluminescent polymers was the most highly cited paper in Angewandte Chemie's 120-year history. By August 2012 he had authored over 490 scientific papers and 52 patent applications. In 2014 he was appointed as President of the Australian Academy of Science.

== Awards and honours ==
Holmes was elected Fellow of the Royal Society (FRS) in 2000, and Fellow of the Australian Academy of Science in 2006. In 2003, he received the Descartes Prize and in 2012 the Royal Medal of the Royal Society. His formal titles include Chemistry alumnus, Laureate Professor of Chemistry, University of Melbourne; CSIRO Fellow, CSIRO Division of Materials Science and Engineering; Emeritus Professor and Distinguished Research Fellow, Imperial College London; Fellow of the Royal Society; Fellow of the Australian Academy of Science; Fellow of the Australian Academy of Technological Sciences and Engineering; and Foreign Secretary and (as of 2014) President of the Australian Academy of Science. In 2011, he received the Royal Society of Chemistry's John B Goodenough Award.

In 2004 he was appointed a Member of the Order of Australia "for service to science through research and development, particularly in the fields of organic synthesis and polymer chemistry"; and in 2017 was appointed Companion of the Order of Australia for eminent service to science through developments in the field of organic and polymer chemistry as a researcher, editor and academic, and through the governance of nationally recognised, leading scientific organisations. He was awarded the 2021 Matthew Flinders Medal and Lecture.

== Personal life ==
Holmes is a keen hillwalker and an enthusiastic aficionado of classical music, from baroque to romantic opera. During his time in Cambridge he was a member and regular volunteer at St Columba's United Reformed Church. He lives in Melbourne and Lorne, Victoria with his wife Jennifer.
