= Spin-off =

Spin-off, Spin Off, Spin-Off, or Spinoff may refer to:

== Entertainment and media ==
- Spin-off (media), a media work derived from an existing work
- The Spinoff, a New Zealand current affairs website
- Spin-Off (American game show), a 1975 American game show
- Spin Off (Canadian game show), a 2013 Canadian game show
- Spin-Off, a game mode in Wii Party
- "Spin Off", a season 2 episode of The Casagrandes
- "The Spinoffs", a season 6 episode of The Amazing World of Gumball

== Other uses ==
- Corporate spin-off, a type of corporate action that forms a new company or entity
- Government spin-off, civilian goods which are the result of military or governmental research
  - NASA spin-off, a spin-off of technology that has been commercialized through NASA funding, research, licensing, facilities, or assistance
- Research spin-off, a company founded on the findings of a research group at a university
  - University spin-off, a subcategory of research spin-offs
- Brand extension, when a firm markets a new product under an already well-known brand

== See also ==
- Offshoot (disambiguation)
- Off spin
