= Ana Claudia Arias =

American physicist

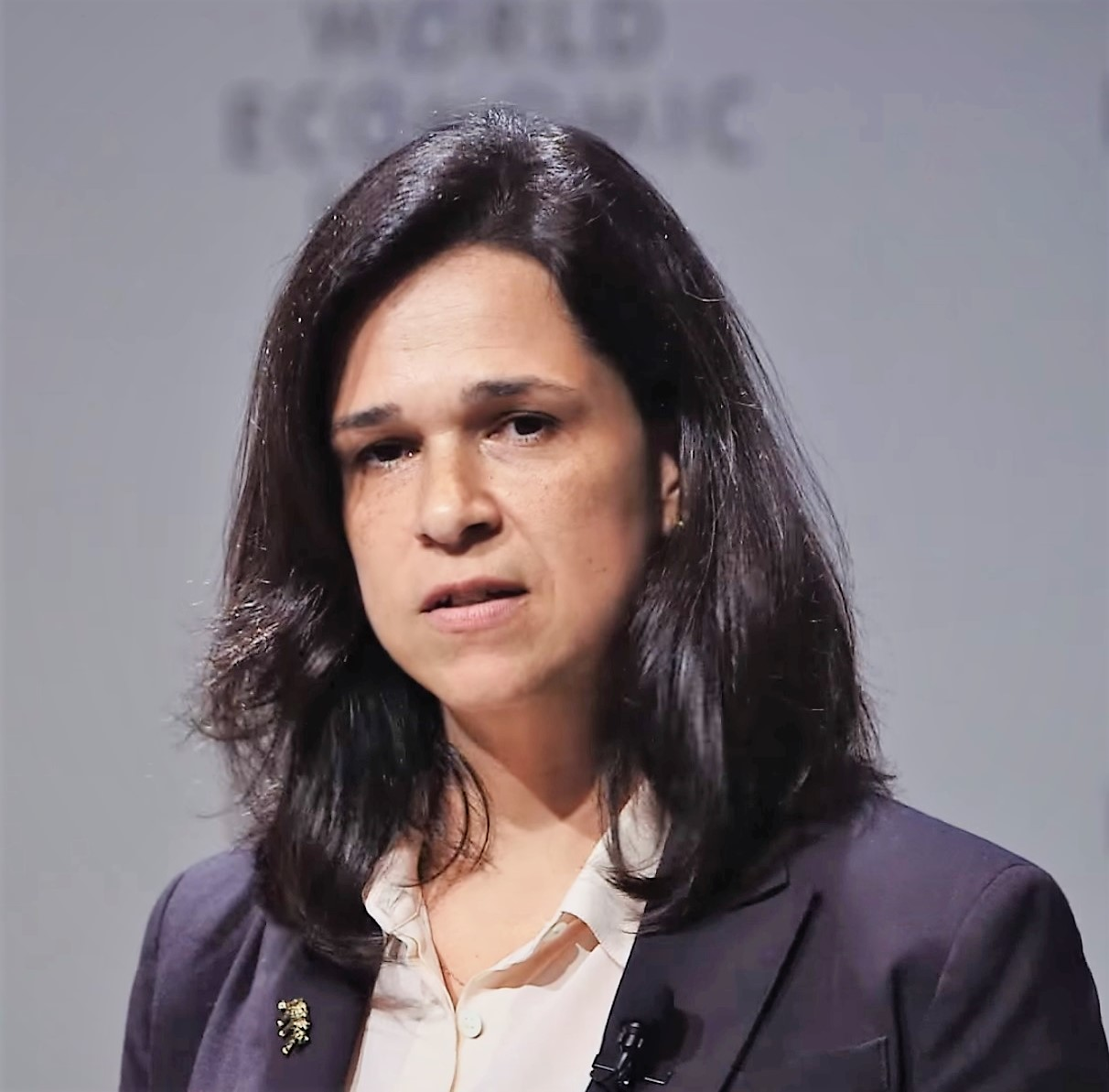
- Arias at the World Economic Forum in 2015
- Born: 1973 (age 52–53); Londrina, Paraná
- Education: University of Cambridge (PhD); Federal University of Paraná (BSc, MSc)
- Scientific career
- Workplaces: Plastic Logic; Palo Alto Research Center; University of California, Berkeley
- Thesis: Conjugated polymer phase separation and three-dimensional thin-film structure for photovoltaics (2001)
- Doctoral advisor: Richard Friend
- Website: Arias Research Group

Ana Claudia Arias (born 1973) is a Brazilian American physicist who is a professor of Electrical Engineering and Computer Sciences at the University of California, Berkeley. Her research considers printed electronic materials and their application in flexible electronics and wearable medical devices.

== Early life and education ==
Arias was born in Londrina, Brazil. She studied physics at the Federal University of Paraná in Brazil, where she earned her master's degree in 1997. Arias moved to the United Kingdom as a graduate student, where she worked in the research group of Richard Friend. Her doctoral research involved investigations into phase-separation within conjugated polymer thin films used in solar cell and OLEDs. Friend and Arias filed several patents on printed electronic devices and materials.

== Research and career ==
Arias worked as a postdoc in the Optoelectronics group at the University of Cambridge, where she helped with the formation of the spin-off company Plastic Logic. At Plastic Logic Arias was responsible for the semiconductor group. Arias left Plastic Logic in 2003, and joined the research team at the Palo Alto Research Center (PARC). At PARC, Arias was responsible for flexible and printed electronics. She worked on the fabrication of wearable sensors, including devices capable of preventing brain injuries in the battlefield. These devices worked by wirelessly monitoring of pressure and acoustic levels.

In 2011 Arias joined the University of California, Berkeley as a Professor of Flexible and Printed Electronics, where she serves as Faculty Director of the Berkeley Wireless Research Center. At Berkeley, she started to develop sensing systems that look track a patient's vital signs, and provide instant feedback to healthcare professionals. As part of these efforts, she created a wearable system for magnetic resonance imaging (MRI) scanning of babies. Conventional MRI systems make use of hard, bulky metal radio frequency coils to receive the MRI signals. The coils are heavier than the babies being scanned, which means that babies must be anaesthetised to obtain clear images. In an attempt to mitigate this, Arias created a flexible, lightweight radiofrequency coil that could be embedded within a swaddle blanket. The flexible MRI receivers entered clinical trials in 2016.

Arias worked with Cambridge Display Technology to develop lightweight skin-like pulse oximeters. The oximeters make use of carbon-based (organic) semiconductors, which allow for the fabrication of low-cost electronic devices on flexible substrates. The sensor makes use of an array of red and near-infrared OLEDs and photodetectors to detect blood-oxygen levels. Beyond the measurement of blood oxygen, Arias has developed a multi-sensor platform capable of photoplethysmography and biomarker detection from human sweat. These sensing platforms allow insight into the physiological state of the human body. The sweat sensors developed by Arias consist of lactate, sodium and ammonium sensors. Arias has also investigated materials and devices that can harvest and store energy.

== Awards and honours ==
- 2017 FlexTech R&D Achievement Award
- 2025 class of IEEE Fellows

== Select publications ==
- Granström, M.; Petritsch, K.; Arias, A. C.; Lux, A.; Andersson, M. R.; Friend, R. H. (1998). "Laminated fabrication of polymeric photovoltaic diodes". Nature. 395 (6699): 257–260. Bibcode:1998Natur.395..257G. doi:10.1038/26183. ISSN 0028-0836. S2CID 4361418.
- Arias, Ana Claudia; MacKenzie, J. Devin; McCulloch, Iain; Rivnay, Jonathan; Salleo, Alberto (2010-01-13). "Materials and Applications for Large Area Electronics: Solution-Based Approaches". Chemical Reviews. 110 (1): 3–24. doi:10.1021/cr900150b. ISSN 0009-2665. PMID 20070114.
- Khan, Yasser; Ostfeld, Aminy E.; Lochner, Claire M.; Pierre, Adrien; Arias, Ana C. (2016). "Monitoring of Vital Signs with Flexible and Wearable Medical Devices". Advanced Materials. 28 (22): 4373–4395. Bibcode:2016AdM....28.4373K. doi:10.1002/adma.201504366. ISSN 1521-4095. PMID 26867696. S2CID 2119933.
