= Christine Luscombe =

Japanese-American chemist

Christine Luscombe FRSC
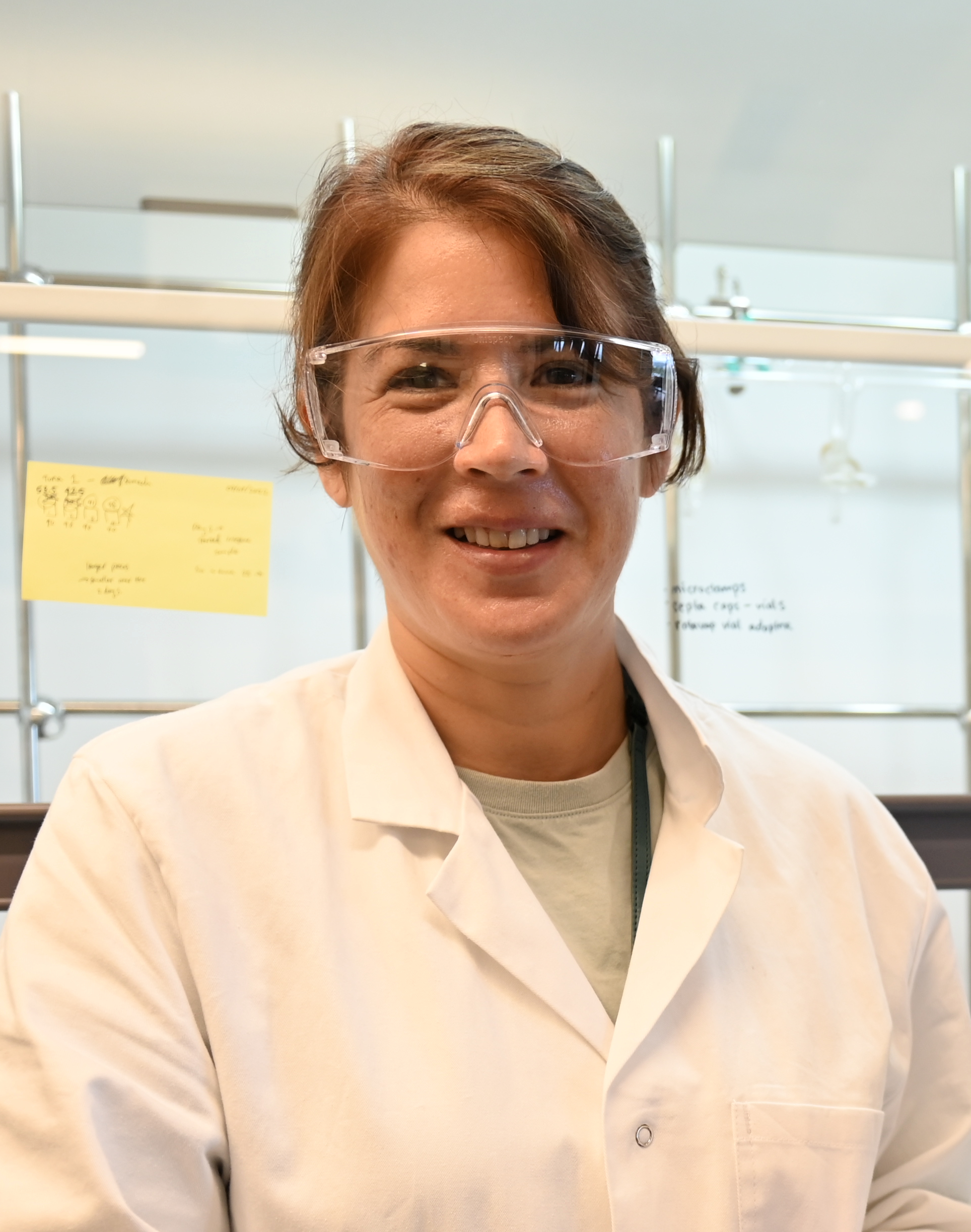
- Christine Luscombe
- Born: Christine Keiko Luscombe; Kobe
- Education: University of Cambridge (BA, PhD)
- Awards: NSF CAREER Award; Sloan Research Fellowship
- Scientific career
- Fields: Polymer chemistry Organic electronics Organic photovoltaics
- Workplaces: University of Washington; University of California, Berkeley; Okinawa Institute of Science and Technology; University of Cambridge
- Thesis: Surface modifications using supercritical carbon dioxide (2004)
- Doctoral advisor: Andrew Bruce Holmes
- Website: groups.oist.jp/picpu/christine-luscombe

Christine Luscombe FRSC is a Japanese-British chemist who is a professor at the Okinawa Institute of Science and Technology. Her research investigates polymer chemistry, organic electronics, organic photovoltaics and the synthesis of novel materials for processable electronics. She serves on the editorial boards of Macromolecules, Advanced Functional Materials, the Annual Review of Materials Research and ACS Applied Materials & Interfaces.

== Early life and education ==
Luscombe was born and raised in Kobe, Japan. She became interested in chemistry at high school, and grew up surrounded by electronic devices developed by Sony and Panasonic. She was an undergraduate student at the University of Cambridge, where she specialised in chemistry. She eventually joined the group of Andrew Bruce Holmes, where she worked on polymer synthesis and earned her PhD in 2004.

== Research and career ==
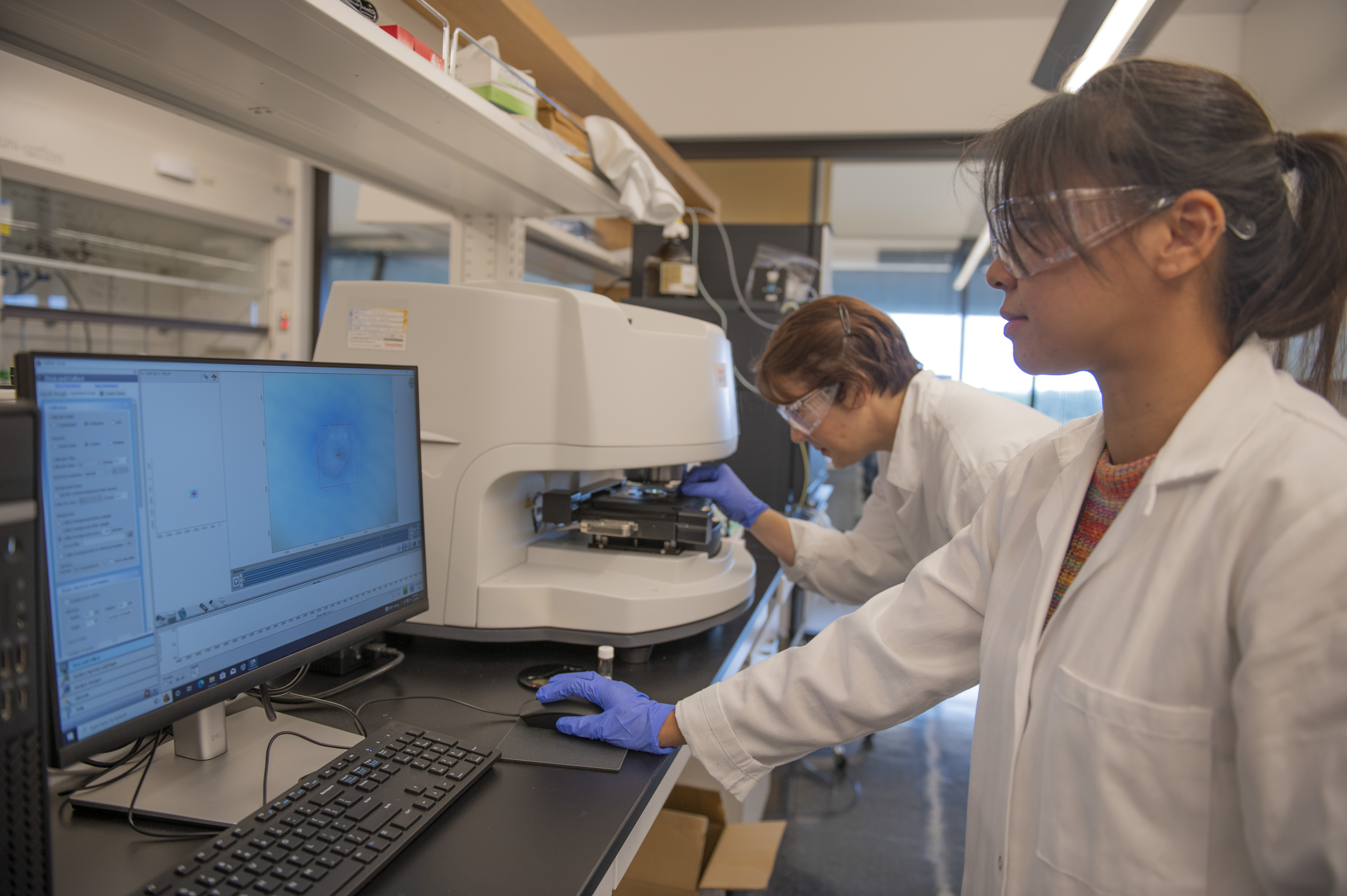
with Dr. Samantha Phan

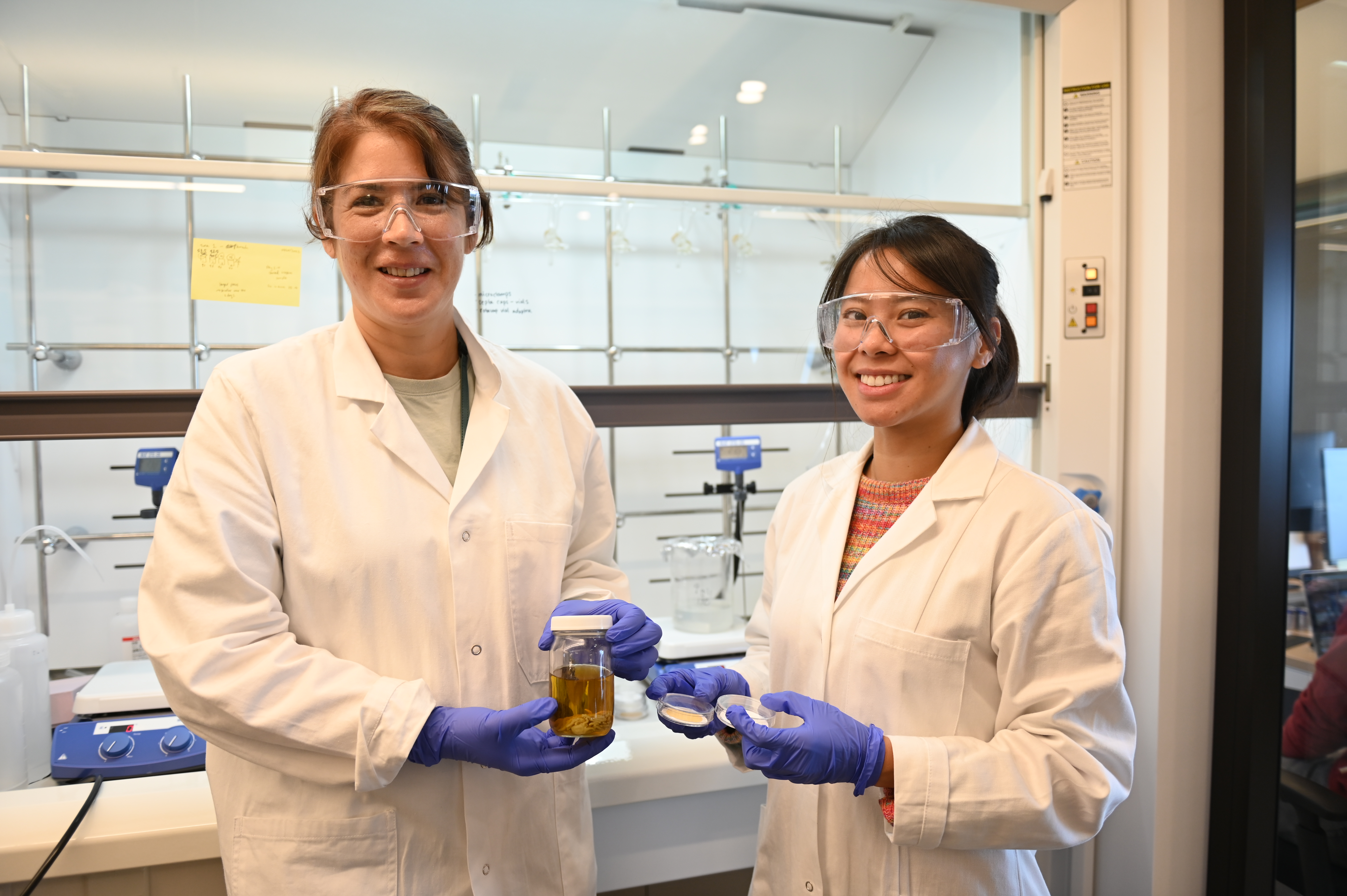
with Dr. Samantha Phan

After her PhD, Luscombe was awarded a junior research fellowship at Trinity College, Cambridge. She simultaneously joined the group of Jean Fréchet at the University of California, Berkeley. After two years in California, Luscombe was made an assistant professor at the University of Washington. In her early career she was awarded an National Science Foundation CAREER Award, a DARPA Young Faculty Award and a Sloan Research Fellowship. She was made an associate professor in 2011 and the Robert J. Cambell Development Professor in 2017. Her research considers the synthesis of conjugated small molecules and polymers for photovoltaics. She is particularly interested in the identification of structure-property relationships and achieving a better understanding of how microstructure impacts optoelectronic properties. She has particularly focused on the rational design of high mobility polymers. She has contributed to International Union of Pure and Applied Chemistry (IUPAC) initiatives on polymer terminology and polymer education.

In 2020, Luscombe joined the Okinawa Institute of Science and Technology. In an interview with Chemical & Engineering News, Luscombe says that she began to feel unwelcome in the United States when Donald Trump instigated Executive Order 13769, the so-called Muslim travel ban. She said that she chose to leave the United States due to the growing racism and mismanagement of the public health response to the COVID-19 pandemic.

== Awards and honors ==
Her awards and honors include:

- 2015 Kavli Fellow
- 2016 Elected a Fellow of the Royal Society of Chemistry (FRSC)
- 2017 University of Washington College of Engineering Faculty Award
- 2020 Elected to the Washington State Academy of Sciences

== Selected publications ==
Her publications include:

- All-inkjet-printed flexible electronics fabrication on a polymer substrate by low-temperature high-resolution selective laser sintering of metal nanoparticles
- The future of organic photovoltaics
- Direct nanoimprinting of metal nanoparticles for nanoscale electronics fabrication
- Semiconducting polymers : controlled synthesis and microstructure
