= List of fellows of the Royal Society elected in 2012 =

This is a list of people elected Fellow of the Royal Society in 2012.

== Fellows ==
- Varinder Kumar Aggarwal
- John Aggleton
- Shankar Balasubramanian
- Philip Nigel Bartlett
- Alan Bundy
- Jeremy Burroughes
- Gordon Dougan
- Michele Dougherty
- Christopher Dye
- Garret FitzGerald
- Patrick William Fowler
- Hermann Hauser
- Alasdair Iain Houston
- Christopher Michael Hull
- Steve Jones
- Dominic David Joyce
- Richard Kerswell
- Chandrashekhar Khare
- David Klenerman
- Tony Kouzarides
- Russell Lande
- Julian Hart Lewis
- Eddy Liew
- Ian Calman Muir MacLennan
- David MacMillan
- Trevor John McDougall
- John Michael McNamara
- Andrew John McWalter Millar
- David Owen Morgan
- Hugh O'Neill
- Michael Petrides
- Margaret Robinson
- Brian Schmidt
- Chris D. Thomas
- Hywel Rhys Thomas
- Mathukumalli Vidyasagar
- Krishnaswamy VijayRaghavan
- Tejinder Virdee
- Gabriel Waksman
- Ian Walmsley
- Mark Warner
- Timothy John Williams
- Stephen Withers
- Daniel Wolpert

== Foreign members ==
- Bonnie Bassler
- Ralph J. Cicerone
- Avelino Corma Canos
- Jack E. Dixon
- Denis Duboule
- Paul R. Ehrlich
- Zhou Guangzhao
- Reinhard Genzel
