= Chemical Science (journal) =

- Discipline: Chemistry
- Language: English
- Edited by: Andrew Ian Cooper

Publication details
- History: 2010-present
- Publisher: Royal Society of Chemistry (United Kingdom)
- Frequency: Weekly
- Open access: Yes
- License: Creative Commons Attribution 3.0
- Impact factor: 7.4 (2024)

Standard abbreviations
- ISO 4: Chem. Sci.

Indexing
- CODEN: CSHCCN
- ISSN: 2041-6520 (print); 2041-6539 (web)
- OCLC no.: 648957145

Links
- Journal homepage

Chemical Science is a weekly peer-reviewed scientific journal covering all aspects of chemistry. It is the flagship journal of the Royal Society of Chemistry. It was established in July 2010 and is published by the Royal Society of Chemistry; before 2018, it was published monthly. It won the Best New Journal 2011 award from the Association of Learned and Professional Society Publishers. The editor-in-chief is Andrew Ian Cooper (University of Liverpool).

In January 2015, the journal moved to an open access publishing model. It was a diamond open access journal, with no charges to readers or authors till 01 July, 2026, and has become "Gold Open access" (authors pay article processing charge) since then.

== Abstracting and indexing ==
The journal is abstracted and indexed in:

- Science Citation Index Expanded
- Current Contents/Physical, Chemical & Earth Sciences
- Chemical Abstracts Service
- Directory of Open Access Journals

According to the Journal Citation Reports, the journal has a 2024 impact factor of 7.4.

== See also ==
- Chemical Communications
- Chemical Society Reviews
