= Research spin-off =

Type of company

A research spin-off is a company that funds researchers to enhance the results of their own research activity and scientific prospects, which may fall into at least one of the four following categories:

1. Companies that have an Equity investment from a national library or university
2. Companies that license technology from a public research institute or university
3. Companies that consider a university or public sector employee to have been a founder
4. Companies that have been established directly by a public research institution

Private Equity investment promotes the development of new technologies by directly injecting funds to ease enterprises' cash flow pressure, as well as using credit endorsement to expand debt equity channels.

Research findings indicate that the performance of university research commercialization is based on different factors such as the size of the university, the direct relationship to the university, and the efforts spent on resources. Larger universities have an abundance of resources which gives opportunities for licensing and the development of new technology transfer. While technical universities are able to specialize in sectors that are progressive for that specific industry.

Companies that have been established directly by public research institutions have implemented an ecosystem approach as it pertains to their research and communication networks. Where research bridges between students and scholars, and creates connections to further diversify the market. It is a network that develops clusters of knowledge with firms, universities, and libraries.

University spin-offs expand networks with expertise at different levels of development.With the growth of new innovations there are many stages that each have distinct amounts of funding, depending on how integrated they are in the process.

The two main research spin-off models in Russia are those developed from the Institutes of the Academy of Science and Svetlana.

== Examples of Research spin-off ==
Svetlana logo

=== Russian ===
Svetlana

Svetlana is a spin-off of Ruselectronics, a Russian state owned company, falls into the category of company that has been established by public research institution. Ruselectronics is owned by Rostec, a Russian conglomerate of defense, engineering, and pharmaceutical organizations.

Historically, Svetlana produced a number of types of vacuum tubes. It currently distributes integrated circuits.

Russian Academy of Sciences

In October 1991, it was ruled that the government was to create an academy of sciences after the fall of the historical Soviet Union. The Academy was government-sanctioned to replace the Soviet Academy of the Sciences. It has made innovations in areas related to the natural, technical, and social sciences which has sparked an abundance developments in those respected fields.

Amongst many others, the Russian Academy of Sciences has an Institute of Plant Physiology, a Radiobiological Society, and a Council on Study of Protective Forces.

=== United Kingdom ===
QinetiQ

QinetiQ is a research spin-off in the United Kingdom. Prior to its 2001 reestablishment as a private equity company, it was owned and operated by the British government. It specializes in defense technologies. It has some ties to the United States government, as a contract was signed between the two entities in 2020. QinetiQ specializes in defense and security, specifically cyber-related work.

== See also ==
- Government spin-off, civilian goods which are the result of military or governmental research
  - NASA spin-off, a spin-off of technology that has been commercialized through NASA funding, research, licensing, facilities, or assistance
- University spin-off, a company founded on the findings of a member or by members of a research group at a university
