= Jeremy Burroughes =

British physicist and engineer (born 1960)

Jeremy Henley Burroughes
- Born: August 1960
- Education: Queen Mary University of London; University of Cambridge (PhD)
- Known for: Conjugated polymer electroluminescence
- Awards: Jan Rajchman Prize (2005); FRS (2012)
- Scientific career
- Fields: Physics, engineering
- Workplaces: Toshiba; Cambridge Display Technology
- Thesis: The physical processes in organic semiconducting polymer devices. (1989)
- Academic advisors: Richard Friend

Jeremy Henley Burroughes FREng FRS (born August 1960) is a British physicist and engineer, known for his contributions to the development of organic electronics through his work on the science of semiconducting polymers and molecules and their application. He is the Chief Technology Officer of Cambridge Display Technology, a company specialising in the development of technologies based on polymer light-emitting diodes.

== Education ==
Burroughes earned his PhD from the University of Cambridge in 1989. His thesis was entitled The physical processes in organic semiconducting polymer devices.

== Work ==
Early in his career, Burroughes discovered that certain conjugated polymers were capable of emitting light when an electric current passed through them. The discovery of this previously unknown form of electroluminescence led to the foundation of Cambridge Display Technology where Burroughes has been responsible for a number of technology innovations, including the direct printing of full-colour OLED displays.

== Awards and honours ==
Burroughes was elected a Fellow of the Royal Society (FRS) in 2012. His certificate of election reads:

Burroughes made the seminal advances in the science and engineering of semiconducting polymers that have brought these materials from research to the marketplace. His early papers from Cambridge on polymer FETs (1988) and LEDs (1990) defined the scope of the field. In his role as Chief Technology Officer at Cambridge Display Technology he has transformed early demonstration into fully manufacturable technology, using new device architectures, new materials and new manufacturing processes such as direct printing of full colour LED displays. This engineering programme has generated fundamental understanding of the underlying device physics.
