= Peter Friend (surgeon) =

British academic

Peter Friend is a transplant surgeon and Professor of Transplantation, and was Director of the Oxford Transplant Centre from 2000 to 2022. He is a fellow of Green Templeton College, Oxford.

Friend co-founded a spinout company, OrganOx, with biomedical engineer Constantin Coussios in 2008. OrganOx provided a novel organ transplantation technology to extend the life of donor organs outside the human body. In 2025, OrganOx was bought by the Japanese company Terumo corporation for £1.1 billion. At the time, this was one of the largest sales of a spinout venture from Oxford University.

Friend was elected a Fellow of the Academy of Medical Sciences in 2020.

His brother Richard Friend is Cavendish Professor of Physics at the University of Cambridge.
