= Offshoot =

Offshoot may refer to:

- Offshoot, a newer name for the Transformers character "Firebolt", who is Targetmaster partner to Hot Rod/Rodimus
- Offshoot (plant), a concept in botany

== See also ==
- Spin-off (disambiguation)
