= Daniel Joseph Bradley =

Irish physicist

Dan Bradley FRS FInstP MRIA
- Born: Daniel Joseph Bradley; 18 January 1928; Derry, Northern Ireland, United Kingdom
- Died: 7 February 2010 (aged 82)
- Education: Royal Holloway, University of London
- Children: Donal Bradley
- Awards: Cunningham Medal; Royal Medal; Young Medal and Prize
- Scientific career
- Workplaces: Trinity College, Dublin; Imperial College London; Queen's University, Belfast
- Thesis: A high resolution interference spectroscope (1961)
- Doctoral advisor: Samuel Tolansky
- Doctoral students: Martin Richardson; J. Roy Taylor
- Website: imperial.ac.uk/newsandeventspggrp/imperialcollege/naturalsciences/physics/newssummary/news_26-2-2010-14-46-5

Daniel Joseph Bradley FRS FInstP MRIA (18 January 1928 – 7 February 2010) was an Irish physicist, and Emeritus Professor of Optical Electronics, at Trinity College, Dublin.

== Early life and education ==
Born on 18 January 1928, he was one of four surviving children of John and Margaret Bradley, Lecky Road, Derry. He left school to work as a telegraph boy but returned to education at St Columb's College. Having trained as a teacher at St Mary's College, Belfast, Northern Ireland, he qualified in 1947.

While teaching in a primary school in Derry he studied for a degree in mathematics as an external student of the University of London, and was awarded a degree in 1953.

Moving to London where he taught mathematics in a grammar school, he decided to register for an evening course at Birkbeck College. His first choice was mathematics but as he already had a degree in the subject the admissions staff suggested that he should study physics, which they said was "a bit like mathematics".

In 1957, after four years of part-time study, he was awarded a Bachelor of Science degree in physics by Birkbeck, achieving the highest marks in his final exams in the University of London overall. He next joined Royal Holloway College as an assistant lecturer and simultaneously enrolled as a PhD student, working on Fabry–Pérot interferometer etalon-based high-resolution spectroscopy supervised by Samuel Tolansky, and received a PhD in 1961.

== Career and research ==
Bradley was a pioneer of laser physics, and his work on the development of ultra-fast pulsed lasers added a new element to the capabilities of this new type of light source. In particular, working on dye lasers, he produced pulses of light as short as one picosecond – one picosecond is to a second as a second is to 31,800 years – and his work paved the way for the completely new field of non-linear optical interactions. In addition, he inspired a new generation of laser scientists in Ireland and the UK, many of whom are international leaders in their fields.

Appointed to a lectureship in the physics department at Imperial College London, he set up a research programme in UV solar spectroscopy using rocket technology to reach high altitudes.

In 1963 he began work in laser physics but returned to Royal Holloway College as a reader one year later. In 1966 he was appointed professor and head of department at Queen's University, Belfast.

There he quickly established a space research group of international standing to do high-resolution solar spectroscopy. He attracted significant funding from a variety of agencies, allowing him to build his department into one of the world's leading laser research centres, involving a total of 65 scientists. However, he left Belfast because of fears for his family's safety as political violence escalated in the early 1970s amidst The Troubles.

He returned in 1973 to Imperial College London to a chair in laser physics, and headed a group in optical physics, laser physics and space optics. He was head of the Physics department from 1976 to 1980 but he was frustrated by cutbacks and a rule governing the ratio of senior to junior positions, one consequence of which was that he was unable to maintain a long-established chair in optical design.

He was also critical of the college administration's handling of some departmental grant applications. He resigned in 1980 and moved to Dublin.

Among his many lasting contributions to laser research in the UK was the setting up of one of the world's leading research facilities for laser research, the Central Laser Facility at the Rutherford Appleton Laboratory (RAL).

Arriving at Trinity College, Dublin, he decided the time was ripe to move on from laser research and development into laser applications. In 1982, with Dr John Kelly, a chemist, and Dr David McConnell, a geneticist, he formed a team which won funding for a project using laser techniques to explore the structure of organic molecules like DNA and proteins.

Unfortunately, however, his work at Trinity was cut short by ill health and he retired in 1984. But his research on semiconductor lasers was carried on (by researchers including Paul Phelan, John McInerney, James O'Gorman and John Hegarty), this work on developing widely tuneable lasers for optical communications systems continues.

In the course of a relatively short academic career he supervised over 60 PhD students, one of whom described his former mentor as an "inspiration" and a "great role-model for any researcher"; another, his last (Paul Phelan) fully confirms this.

=== Awards and honours ===
A member of the Royal Irish Academy, he was Fellow Emeritus of Trinity College Dublin, and held fellowships of the Royal Society, Optical Society of America and Institute of Physics. . He received several awards in recognition of his work including:

- Young Medal and Prize from the Institute of Physics (1975)
- Royal Medal from the Royal Society (1982)
- Charles Hard Townes Medal from Optical Society of America (1989)
- Cunningham Medal from the Royal Irish Academy (2001)
- Honorary degrees from the University of Ulster (1983) and Queen's University Belfast (1986)

== Personal life ==
He married Winefride O'Connor and had five children: daughter Mairead and sons Sean, Donal Bradley, Martin and Ronan.
