= Stuart Conway =

British chemist

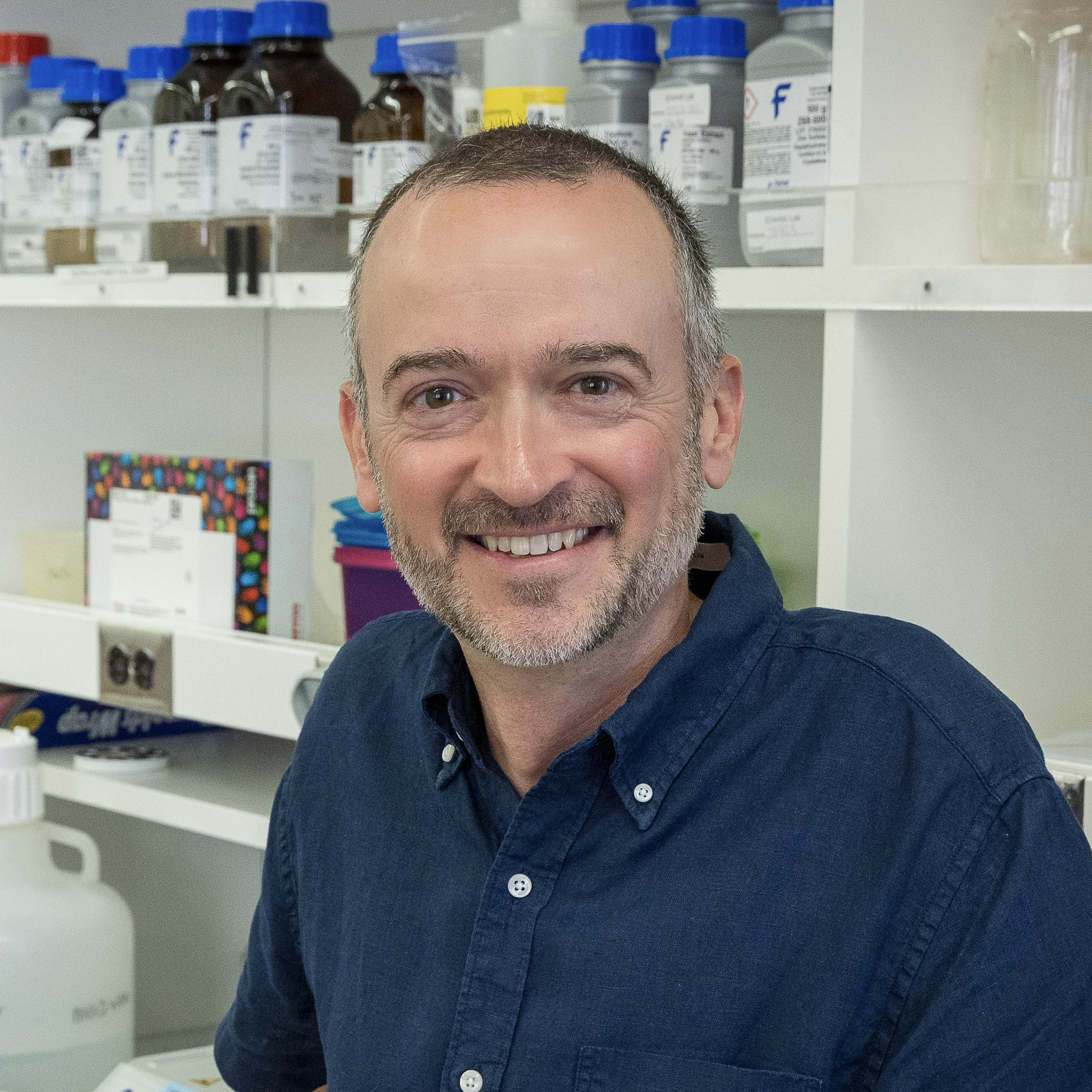
- Conway in 2023
- Born: Cuckfield, England
- Education: University of Warwick, University of Bristol
- Awards: The European Federation for Medicinal Chemistry Prize for a Young Medicinal Chemist (2012) The UCB-Ehrlich Award from the European Federation for Medicinal Chemistry (2024) The Robert M. Scarborough Award for Excellence in Medicinal Chemistry from the American Chemical Society Division of Medicinal Chemistry (2024)
- Scientific career
- Workplaces: University of St Andrews, University of Oxford, University of California, Los Angeles
- Thesis: Design and Synthesis of Ligands Acting Selectively at Group III Metabotropic Glutamate Receptor (2001)
- Doctoral advisor: Professor Jeff Watkins, Professor David Jane
- Other academic advisors: Andrew Holmes
- Website: https://sites.google.com/view/conwaygroup

Stuart J. Conway, FRSC., is a British chemist specializing in medicinal chemistry and chemical biology. He currently holds the Michael and Alice Jung Endowed Chair in Medicinal Chemistry and Drug Discovery at the University of California, Los Angeles (UCLA). Conway is a member of the California NanoSystems Institute (CNSI), the UCLA Institute of Molecular Biology, and the Jonsson Comprehensive Cancer Center.

== Education and early career ==
Conway completed his undergraduate studies in chemistry with Medicinal Chemistry at the University of Warwick between 1994 and 1997, where he conducted an undergraduate research project with Professor Andrew Clark. He then pursued his Ph.D. at the University of Bristol from 1997 to 2001, working with Professors Jeff Watkins FRS and David Jane. Following his doctorate, Conway undertook postdoctoral research with Professor Andrew Holmes FRS at the University of Cambridge from 2001 to 2003.

== Academic appointments ==
In 2003, Conway began his independent academic career as a lecturer in Bioorganic Chemistry at the University of St Andrews. He joined the University of Oxford in 2008 as an Associate Professor and was promoted to Full Professor in 2014. During his tenure at Oxford, he also served as the E. P. Abraham Cephalosporin Fellow in Organic Chemistry at St Hugh's College, Oxford. In 2023, Conway moved to UCLA, where he was appointed the inaugural holder of the Michael and Alice Jung Endowed Chair in Medicinal Chemistry and Drug Discovery

== Research focus ==
Conway's research focuses on the development of molecular tools to study biological systems, particularly in the fields of epigenetics, hypoxia, and targeted protein degradation. His lab has made significant contributions to the understanding of cancer biology by designing small molecules that modulate epigenetic targets and hypoxia-inducible factors. His group reported inhibitors of the BET-bromodomain-containing proteins, the CREBBP and P300 bromodomains, and developed hypoxia-targeted pro-drugs and probes for imaging hypoxia in cells.

== Affiliations ==
In 2023, Conway joined the University of California, Los Angeles (UCLA) Department of Chemistry and Biochemistry as a Professor and the inaugural holder of the Michael and Alice Jung Endowed Chair in Medicinal Chemistry and Drug Discovery. He is a member of the California NanoSystems Institute, an interdisciplinary research organization that brings together more than 250 UCLA faculty and researchers from the life sciences, physical sciences, medicine, dentistry, public health, and engineering. Conway is also affiliated with the UCLA Institute of Molecular Biology, which facilitates collaboration among campus research groups focused on molecular structures and regulatory interactions in living systems. In addition, he is a member of the UCLA Health Jonsson Comprehensive Cancer Center, where he collaborates on cancer research initiatives.

== Awards and honors ==
Throughout his career, Conway has received a number of prestigious awards, including:

- The European Federation for Medicinal Chemistry Prize for a Young Medicinal Chemist (2012)
- The UCB-Ehrlich Award from the European Federation for Medicinal Chemistry (2024)
- The Robert M. Scarborough Award for Excellence in Medicinal Chemistry from the American Chemical Society Division of Medicinal Chemistry (2024)
- Translational Melanoma Research Alliance Team Science Award (2024)

== Professional service ==
Conway has held several leadership roles within the scientific community, including:

- President of the Royal Society of Chemistry Organic Division (2019–2022)
- Associate Editor for the Journal of Medicinal Chemistry (2016–2024)
- Associate Editor for ACS Bio & Med Chem Au (2021–2024)
- Member of the European Federation for Medicinal Chemistry Advisory Board (2016–2018)
- Treasurer of the American Chemical Society Division of Medicinal Chemistry (2024–present)
