= J. Roy Taylor =

English professor of Physics (born 1949)

Professor J. Roy Taylor FRS FREng
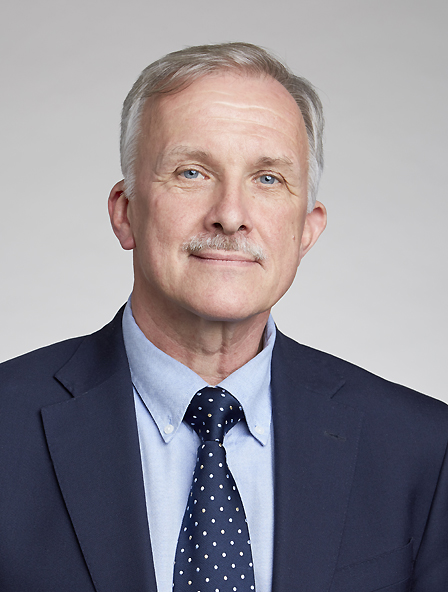
- Taylor in 2017
- Born: James Roy Taylor; 29 April 1949 (age 77); Carrickfergus, Northern Ireland
- Education: Queen's University Belfast
- Awards: Young Medal and Prize (2007); Royal Society Rumford Medal (2012); IEEE Photonics Society Quantum Electronics Award (2018); IoP Michael Faraday Medal (2019); FRS (2017); FREng (2022)
- Scientific career
- Fields: Photonics
- Workplaces: Imperial College London; Technical University of Munich
- Thesis: Studies of Tunable Picosecond Laser Pulses and Nonlinear Interactions (1974)
- Doctoral advisor: Daniel Joseph Bradley
- Website: imperial.ac.uk/people/jr.taylor

James Roy Taylor (born 1949) is a Northern Irish physicist who is professor of ultrafast physics and technology at Imperial College London.

== Education ==
Taylor was educated at Queen's University Belfast, where he was awarded a Bachelor of Science degree in physics in 1971 followed by a PhD in laser physics in 1974 for research supervised by Daniel Joseph Bradley.

== Research and career ==
Taylor is widely acknowledged for his influential basic research on and development of diverse laser systems and their application. He has contributed extensively to advances in picosecond and femtosecond dye laser technology, compact diode-laser and fibre-laser-pumped vibronic lasers and their wide-ranging application to fundamental studies, such as time resolved photophysics of resonant energy transfer and relaxation pathways of biological probes and organic field-effect transistors.

Taylor is particularly noted for his fundamental studies of ultrafast nonlinear optics in fibres, with emphasis on solitons, their amplification, the role of noise and self-effects, such as Raman gain. Through his integration of seeded, high-power fibre amplifiers and passive fibre he has demonstrated far-reaching versatility in pulse duration, repetition rate and spectral coverage. He contributed extensively to the development of high power supercontinuum or “white light” sources, which have been a scientific and commercial success.

=== Awards and honours ===
Taylor's work has been recognized by the Ernst Abbe Award of the Carl Zeiss Foundation in 1990, the Young Medal and Prize of the Institute of Physics (IOP) in 2007, the Rumford Medal from the Royal Society in 2012, the IEEE Photonics Society Quantum Electronics Award in 2018, and the Faraday Medal and Prize of the Institute of Physics in 2019.

He was elected a Fellow of the Royal Society (FRS) in 2017.

He was elected a Fellow of the Royal Academy of Engineering (FREng) in 2022.
