= Martin Richardson =

British-American scientist (born 1941)

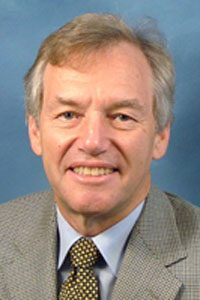
- Born: December 20, 1941 (age 84); Doncaster, Yorkshire, UK
- Education: Imperial College London; London University; Culham Laboratory, UKAEA
- Known for: Photonics; Lasers
- Awards: Fellow, OSA (1992); Fellow, SPIE (2012); Fellow, IEEE (2013); Fellow, APS (2013); Jefferson Science Fellowship, US DoS (2014); Fellow, IoP (2015); Fellow, AAAS (2015); Fulbright-Tocqueville Distinguished Chair, US DoS (2016); Fellow, DEPS (2021)
- Scientific career
- Fields: Physics
- Workplaces: National Research Council (Canada); University of Rochester; University of Central Florida; United States Department of State
- Thesis: A Tunable Two Frequency Output Giant Pulse Ruby Laser (1967)
- Doctoral advisor: Daniel Joseph Bradley
- Website: https://lpl.creol.ucf.edu

Martin Richardson (born December 20, 1941) is a British-American scientist and Professor of Physics. He is best known for the development of high power lasers, and for their use in understanding laser-induced plasma.

== Biography ==
Martin Richardson received his B.Sc. in 1964 from Imperial College London. He completed his Ph.D. at London University in 1966, and he completed postdoctoral training Culham Laboratory. Professor Richardson worked at the National Research Council (Canada) until 1979 when he joined the University of Rochester. In 1990, he moved to the University of Central Florida with appointments as a professor of physics and as a professor of electrical and computer engineering. In 2004, Richardson was invested with the Northrop Grumman Professor of X-ray Photonics, in 2006, he was invested as a University Trustee Chair, and in 2012, he was invested as a Pegasus Professor.

Martin Richardson is a Fellow of the Optical Society of America, the Society of Photo-Instrumentation Engineers, the Institute of Electrical and Electronics Engineers, the American Physical Society, the Institute of Physics, and the American Association for the Advancement of Science. In 2013, he was awarded an honorary degree, Docteur Honoris Causa, by the University of Bordeaux. In 2014, he served as a Jefferson Science Fellow at the United States Department of State, and in 2016 he held the Fulbright-Tocqueville Distinguished Chair from the US DoS.
