= Medical Research Club =

- Established: 1891; 135 years ago
- Location: London, UK
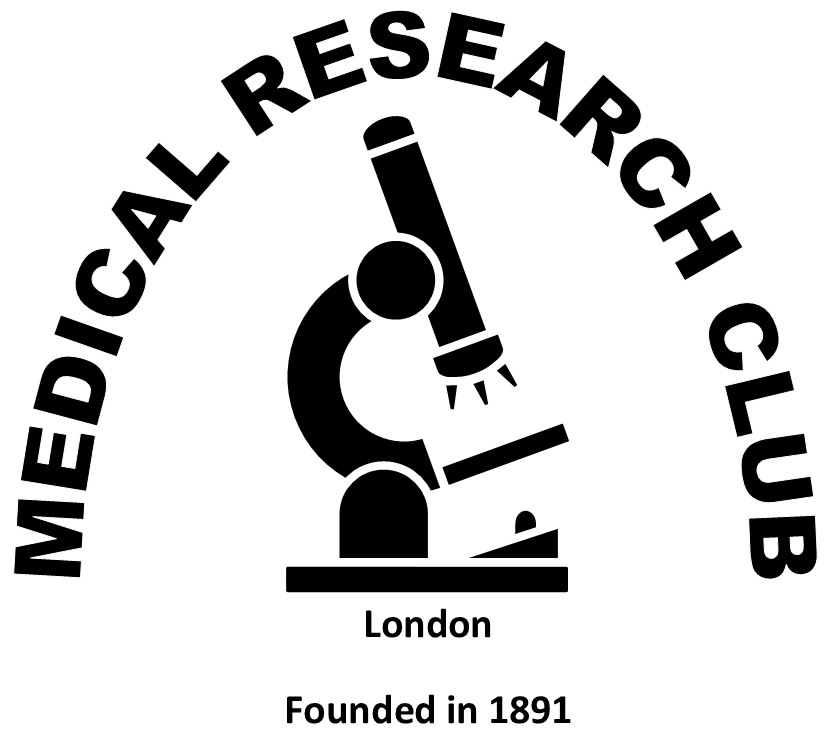

The London Medical Research Club is a society founded in 1891 composed of scientists and medical doctors carrying out research in all fields of medicine and related disciplines. The purpose of the club is to offer an informal venue in which members can confidentially share their opinions and ideas on different scientific and medical topics. Members include scientists who are working or have actively worked in medical research, academic and biomedical research institutions, or biotech, largely, but not exclusively within the London-Oxford-Cambridge research triangle. Members of the club, many of whom are in the early years of their independent scientific careers, meet five times per calendar year in different venues in London. Three guest speakers are invited by members to present their most recent work and these presentations offer the starting point for an open scientific discussion. Speakers may later be invited to join the club.

== History ==
=== Foundation ===
The foundation date of the London Medical Research Club coincides with that of the first recorded meeting on 1 July 1891. The meeting took place in the Theatre of the Conjoint Laboratories on the Victoria Embankment, and was attended by 15 people: Sims Woodhead (chair), Sidney Martin (provisional secretary), Edward Emanuel Klein, Victor Alexander Haden Horsley, William Dobinson Halliburton, Charles Smart Roy, Marc Amand Ruffer, Samuel George Shattock, Charles Sherrington, John Sutton, Frederick Walker Mott, John Wickenford Washbourn, Almroth Edward Wright, Charles Alfred Ballance, and William Hunter. It was during this meeting that the motion to found a Medical Research Club was presented and carried forward.

A provisional list of rules had already been produced by an interim committee, and was reviewed by the members present at the first meeting. The second, third and fourth meetings of the club (on 8, 15 and 22 July 1891) focused on further discussion of the rules, which were finally considered point by point and approved at the fifth meeting (28 October 1891).

The first ordinary meeting of the Medical Research Club was held on Wednesday 18 November 1891, when the first two scientific papers were presented: "The Influence of the Kidney on Tissue Metabolism" by John Rose Bradford; and "Concurrent Infection" by Edward Emanuel Klein.

=== Original rules and notable changes ===
Below are some of the 31 original Rules, as first printed in 1891:

1. This Society is called the Medical Research Club.

2. The objects of the Club are the discussion, and, as far as possible, the demonstration of original work in General and Special Pathological Science, excluding purely clinical observation.

3. The Club shall consist of not more than thirty-five members, all of whom shall be actively engaged in medical research.

4. All communications to the Club shall be absolutely private. Any member who shall publish an account of the proceedings of the Club, shall, ipso facto, cease to be a member of the Club.

11. A book shall be kept in which the qualifications of candidates for election shall be stated by the proposers.

12. The election of new members shall take place annually at the meeting in October.

13. At least seven days before the date of election, the Secretary shall send to each member a printed list of the candidates for election.

14. The election shall be by ballot.

19. The meetings of the Club shall take place six times annually, in October, November, February, March, May and June.

21. The meetings shall take place on Wednesdays and at 8.30pm.

23. At each meeting, one of the members shall, on the motion of the Secretary, be elected to act as Chairman.

24. The Chairman shall direct the business of the meeting.

25. All members shall at the meetings sign their name in an attendance book specially kept for that purpose.

26. Each member may introduce one visitor, whose name shall be sent to the Secretary and announced at the meeting. The member shall be responsible for the observance of the rules by the visitor introduced by him.

The rules of the club have undergone several changes throughout the years, in wording, substance or numbering. Nonetheless, the nature and objectives of the club have not changed, and remain clearly stated in the latest fully revised version of the rules (November 2010).

The original rules 1 and 2 are now combined in rule 1: “This Society shall be called the MEDICAL RESEARCH CLUB. The objectives of the Club shall be primarily social, and include demonstration of original work in General and Special Pathological Science, and the discussion of the same, excluding purely clinical observations.”

The maximum number of Ordinary Members has progressively increased, and different types of membership are accepted, as stated in rule 2: “The Club shall consist of Honorary, Senior, Ordinary and Non-resident Members. There shall not be more than 100 Ordinary Members, all of whom shall be actively engaged in research”.

The process for the election of new Ordinary Members, as defined in the original Rules 11-14, formally remains similar in the current version of the rules. However, nowadays under rule 13 “Every candidate whose name is submitted for election to the Club shall previously have read a paper before the Club, and have been supported by the signatures of two members of the Club.” In addition, rule 15 (“The election shall be by ballot. […]”), is accompanied by a note stating that “In 2009, it has become accepted practice that 10 members’ signatures lead to election of a candidate to membership once the ordinary memberships fall below the maximum memberships’ number. […]”

The time limit for scientific communications was a subject of debate during the first years of the Club. Rule 24 states that “No communication to the Club shall occupy more than 15 minutes in delivery […]. The Chairman shall read this rule at the beginning of each meeting and shall enforce it.”

The main point that “All communications to the Club shall be absolutely private […]” (original rule 4) has been retained in rule 25 of the current list, but a note added in 1934 clarifies that “this rule was never intended to be a secrecy rule. Its prime objective was to enable members to bring forward for discussion unpublished work without incurring the risk of having their results prematurely broadcast. Reading a paper before the Club does not constitute publication. […]”

=== Notable facts and meetings ===
The Medical Research Club has held regular meetings since it was founded, with the exception of two periods of interruption coinciding with the two World Wars. The time and location of the meetings have changed over the years, but they have maintained their nature of informal gatherings in which scientific and medical topics are discussed among colleagues and are often accompanied by dinner.

By 1892, the club was already known outside the United Kingdom, and was invited by the Academy of Sciences of the Institute of France to send two representatives to the celebrations for the seventieth birthday of Pasteur, on 27 December 1892. Two members of the club were also present at the commemoration of the fiftieth year of the founding of the Pasteur Institute in Paris (15 March 1939).

Sir Almroth Wright gave his first presentation to the club in 1892, discussing alterations to the blood in hemophilia. Wright has been one of the most prominent members of the club since its foundation, and gave numerous communications over the years. In 1946 the club sent a congratulatory letter to Sir Almroth Wright on occasion of his 85th birthday and of the 50th anniversary of the publication of his method for prophylactic inoculation against typhoid fever.

Two of the most notable communications to the club were given by Alexander Fleming. In December 1921, Fleming first presented his discovery of lysozyme; then on 13 February 1929 he presented a paper entitled "A medium for the isolation of Pfeiffer's bacillus", in which he described his discovery of penicillin, and its ability to inhibit the growth of gram-positive bacteria. Fleming suggested that penicillin could have been used to isolate gram-negative bacteria, such as Haemophilus influenzae, which are resistant to the antibiotic. Minutes from the meeting indicate that this communication did not elicit any discussion.

On 14 June 1933, the paper "Propagation in ferrets of a virus obtained from influenza patients" by Wilson Smith, Christopher Andrewes, and Patrick Laidlaw provided the first demonstration of the presence of a virus in human influenza.

The first woman to be invited as a visitor and speaker to the club was Harriet Chick in 1909 and 1911. However, the first woman to be elected as an ordinary member was Dorothy Russell, in November 1947.

Between 1967 and 1969, the club agreed that one meeting each year could be devoted to a specific topic, presented by a distinguished invited speaker in one single lecture lasting 45 minutes. Peter Medawar gave a lecture entitled “Anti-lymphocyte serum” in May 1967; Henry Harris discussed “The expression of genetic information: a study in a hybrid cell” in 1968; and William Hayes presented 'The bacterial chromosome' in 1969. Although members of the club received the lectures with enthusiasm, these mono-thematic meetings did not continue in subsequent years.

Alick Isaacs presented three papers in 1958, 1961 and 1966 describing his work on interferon-alpha, a natural anti-viral molecule that is of major scientific and medical interest.

In 1970, Yvonne Cossart illustrated the relation between hepatitis and the Australia antigen, now known as the surface antigen of the hepatitis B virus.

Several members of the Medical Research Club have received honours and prominent positions for their contributions to science and medicine. Eight members have been awarded the Nobel Prize, and nineteen current members are Fellows of the Royal Society.

==== Medical Research Club members who were awarded the Nobel Prize ====
- 1929 - Medicine and Physiology: Frederick Gowland Hopkins (with Christiaan Eijkman), for the discovery of vitamins.
- 1932 - Medicine and Physiology: Charles Scott Sherrington (with Edgar Douglas Adrian), for his discoveries on the functions of neurons
- 1936 - Medicine and Physiology: Henry Hallett Dale (with Otto Loewi), for his discoveries relating to chemical transmission of nerve impulses
- 1945 - Medicine and Physiology: Alexander Fleming, Ernst Boris Chain, Howard Walter Florey, for the discovery of penicillin and its curative effect in various infectious diseases
- 2001 - Medicine and Physiology: Tim Hunt (with Leland H. Hartwell and Paul M. Nurse), for the discovery of key regulators of the cell cycle.
- 2015 - Chemistry: Tomas Lindahl (with Paul Modrich and Aziz Sancar), for mechanistic studies of DNA repair.

==== Current and recent Medical Research Club members who are Fellows of the Royal Society (year of election as a Fellow of the Royal Society) ====
- Professor Avrion Mitchison (1967).
- Sir John Skehel (1984)
- Dr Tomas Lindahl (1988)
- Sir Salvador Moncada (1988)
- Sir Tim Hunt (1991)
- Professor Alan Rickinson (1997)
- Professor Robin Weiss (1997)
- Professor Robert Williamson (1999)
- Dame Bridget Ogilvie (2003)
- Professor Geoffrey Smith (2003)
- Professor Fiona Watt (2003)
- Professor David Holden (2004)
- Professor Michael Malim (2007)
- Sir Leszek Borysiewicz (2008)
- Professor Anne O'Garra (2008)
- Sir Mark Walport (2011)
- Professor Eddy Liew (2012)
- Professor Gillian Griffiths (2013)
- Sir John Savill (2013)
- Professor Adrian Hayday (2016)

== The club today ==
=== Meetings ===
The Medical Research Club has had regular meetings since resuming its activity after WWII. The meetings are held on Wednesdays, namely the second Wednesday of the month, in February, March, May, October and November. Many of the members who regularly attend the meetings are young, active scientists and clinicians in the early years of their independent research careers; 35 new ordinary members have been elected since 2011. Members are encouraged to bring guests, who are invited to join in the discussions. Guests must abide by the rules of the club, under their host's responsibility. The location is often, but not always, within the research institution in London where the chairman of the meeting works. The meetings are preceded by a social gathering of approximately 30 minutes during which members can introduce their guests to other members. In the meeting proper, the chairman reads the minutes from the previous meeting, then welcomes the members and announces the names of the guests for the evening. Before introducing the speakers, the chairman reads rule 24 to the audience, to remind the speakers of the 15 minute time limit. Three scientific communications are given by the invited speakers, who then become candidates for membership, and the presentation is opened for discussion. The scientific presentations are followed by a dinner in a restaurant, which provides more opportunities for members and guests to interact.

=== Membership ===
During the meeting, members and guests are asked to confirm their presence by signing the attendance book. A nomination book is also circulated during the meeting with the name of each candidate for membership on each page. Members only (not guests) have the opportunity to support a candidate by signing the relevant page of the nomination book. At the annual general meeting, which is usually held in November, a motion is made for the candidates who have received 10 nominations to be invited to join the club, and the page with their name is removed from the nomination book.

=== Types of membership ===
There are four types of members of the Medical Research Club: Honorary, Senior, Ordinary, and Non-resident. Ordinary Members are elected when, after having presented a paper in front of the club, they receive nominations from 10 current members. The number of Ordinary Members is limited to 100, and all Ordinary Members must be actively involved in bio-medical research and reside or work within a radius of 12 miles from Charing Cross.

An Ordinary Member who has retired from the club may be elected as an Honorary Member. Election must be supported by at least four-fifths of the members present at the annual general meeting.

Ordinary Members can become Senior Members if their membership has lasted uninterruptedly for twenty years, or when they reach sixty years of age.

An Ordinary Member who has served at least one year and resides or is engaged in research work outside the 12 mile radius from Charing Cross can become a Non-Resident Member.

=== Members ===
As of January 2016, the London Medical Research Club counts 83 Ordinary, 31 Senior, 45 Non-Resident (32 Ordinary and 13 Senior) and 1 Honorary Member, representing a total of 21 research institutions, including academia, government and industry.

=== Governance ===
Governance of the club is via an executive committee, led by ‘The Club Secretary’ (renamed ‘The Chair’ of the Medical Research Club in 2014), the Treasurer and six members of the club (who consider club governance and support the chair and treasurer). Each member of the executive committee is nominated and voted annually the annual general meeting.

==== The current executive committee (2018) ====
- Chair – Professor Martin Cranage, St. George's, University of London (SGUL)
- Treasurer - Dr Sandra Diebold, National Institute for Biological Standards and Control (NIBSC)
- Professor Charles Bangham, Imperial College London
- Professor Mark Marsh, University College London
- Dr Linda Klavinskis, King’s College London (KCL) (former chair)
- Dr Andreas Wack, The Francis Crick Institute
- Dr Nigel Temperton, University of Kent (former treasurer)
- Dr Michael Skinner, Imperial College London
