= University spin-off =

Company commercializing university research

University spin-offs (also known as university spin-outs) are companies that transform technological inventions developed from university research that are likely to remain unexploited otherwise. They are a subcategory of research spin-offs. Prominent examples of university spin-offs are Genentech, Crucell, Lycos and Plastic Logic. In most countries, universities can claim the intellectual property (IP) rights on technologies developed in their laboratories. In the United States, the Bayh–Dole Act permits universities to pursue ownership of inventions made by researchers at their institutions using funding from the federal government, where previously federal research funding contracts and grants obligated inventors (wherever they worked) to assign the resulting IP to the government. This IP typically draws on patents or, in exceptional cases, copyrights. Therefore, the process of establishing the spin-off as a new corporation involves transferring the IP to the new corporation or giving the latter a license on this IP. Most research universities now have Technology Licensing Offices (TLOs) to facilitate and pursue such opportunities.

== Critical steps in developing a spin-off ==
University spin-offs typically go through a number of critical steps to develop the initial invention into a successful business venture. The following steps are critical in creating a successful spin-off (not necessarily in this order).

- Developing a successful Business Model Canvas for the spin-off; a business model depicts the rationale of how the spin-off will create, deliver and capture value.
- Acquiring the first customers. The first customer, also called an early adopter, can provide candid feedback to help the spin-off refine future product releases and also provide access to a distribution channel or other forms of support.
- Developing a proof of concept, or proof of principle, that demonstrates that the invented method or new theory is probably useful in a particular application - for example a new product.
- Developing a fully functioning prototype of this new product; the prototype also serves to learn about how to produce, use and sell the new product.
- Attracting startup funding to finance the development of prototypes and new products; this may involve acquiring financial resources from venture capital firms, angel Investors, banks, or other providers of early-stage financial capital.

See Small Business Innovation Research for associated spin-off funding opportunities.

== Conditions for spin-off creation ==
Some universities generate substantially higher numbers of spin-offs than others. Universities with high numbers of successful spin-offs:

- draw on university-wide awareness of entrepreneurial opportunities and/or benefit from a strong entrepreneurship culture at the national or regional level;
- have developed a university culture that thrives on entrepreneurial role models among their alumni and academic staff as well as successful spin-offs that serve as inspiring examples (e.g. Lycos at Carnegie Mellon University);
- actively stimulate the development of entrepreneurial talent and help founders of spin-offs obtain access to investors, consultants and other forms of support; these activities are particularly critical in (e.g. continental European) countries that suffer from an entrepreneurial culture that is weaker than elsewhere (e.g. USA).

== Other issues ==
University spin-off activity may give rise to potential conflicts of interest between commercial and academic work. In addition, the university's reputation may be at risk if founders of spin-offs act inappropriately. Moreover, the antagonism between academic research and technology commercialization by way of spin-offs is likely to create fairness issues, for example regarding the distribution of royalties or equity. This antagonism can be managed by installing transparent procedures for the spin-off formation process that enhance fair treatment of all participants.

== Examples of university spin-offs ==
- Akamai (Massachusetts Institute of Technology)
- Bose Corporation (Massachusetts Institute of Technology)
- Boston Dynamics (Massachusetts Institute of Technology)
- Cambridge Mobile Telematics (Massachusetts Institute of Technology)
- Crucell (Leiden University)
- Genentech (University of California, San Francisco)
- Google (Stanford University)
- iRobot (Massachusetts Institute of Technology)
- Locus Biosciences (North Carolina State University)
- Lycos (Carnegie Mellon University)
- Maplesoft (University of Waterloo)
- MATLAB (University of New Mexico)
- Meraki (Massachusetts Institute of Technology)
- Nimble VR (Massachusetts Institute of Technology)
- Plastic Logic (University of Cambridge)
- OkCupid (Massachusetts Institute of Technology)
- RSA Security (Massachusetts Institute of Technology)
- TK Solver (Massachusetts Institute of Technology)

== See also ==
- Angel investor
- Entrepreneurship
- Intellectual property
- Proof of concept
- Research spin-off
- Spin-off (disambiguation)
- Venture capital
