= Andy Cooper (chemist) =

Professor of Chemistry

Professor Andy Cooper FRS
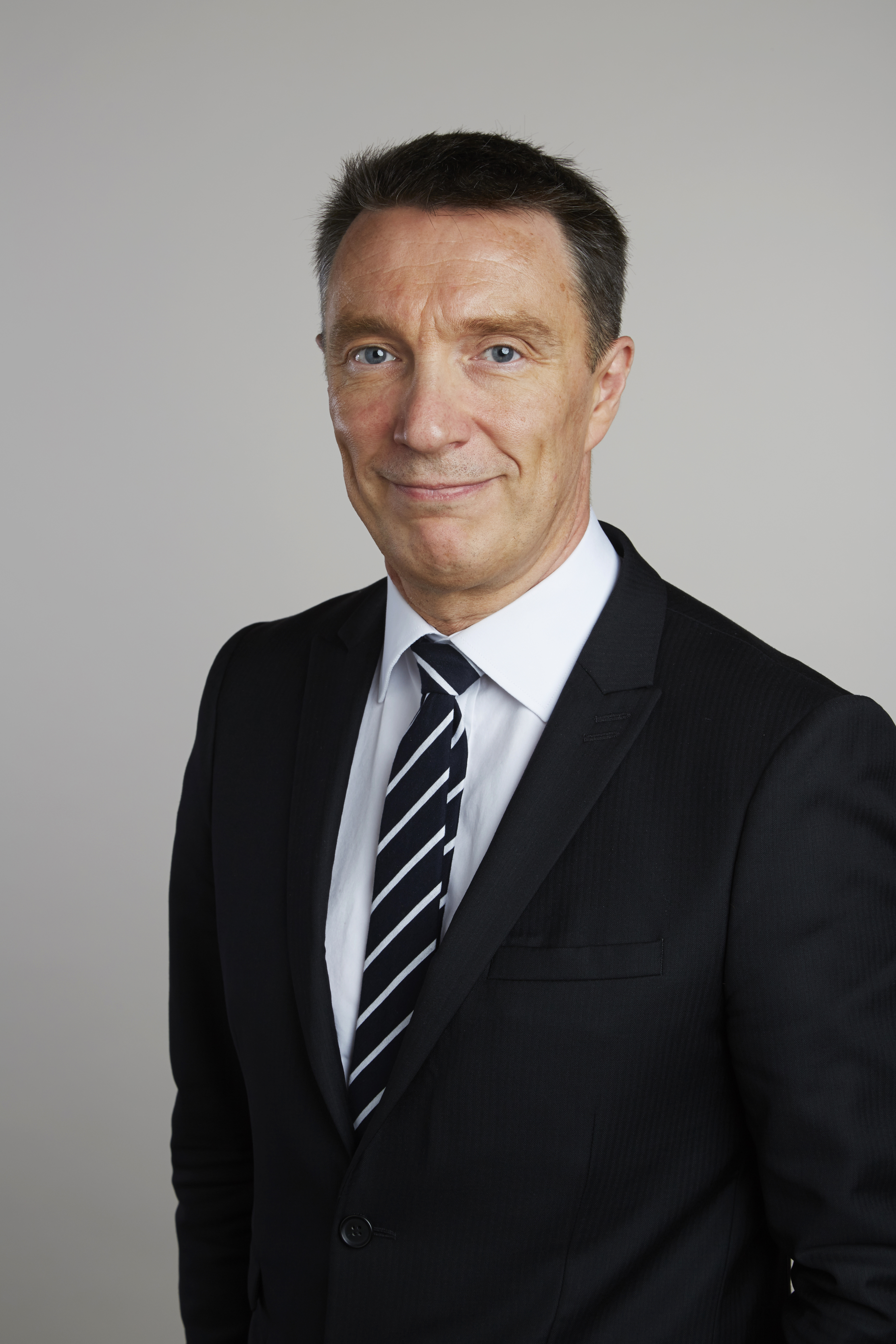
- Cooper in 2015
- Born: Andrew Ian Cooper
- Education: University of Nottingham
- Awards: FRS (2015); Hughes Medal (2019)
- Scientific career
- Fields: Materials chemistry
- Workplaces: University of Liverpool; University of Cambridge; University of North Carolina at Chapel Hill
- Doctoral advisor: Martyn Poliakoff
- Other academic advisors: Joseph DeSimone; Andrew Bruce Holmes
- Website: www.liverpool.ac.uk/people/andrew-cooper

Andrew Ian Cooper is a British chemist who is a professor of chemistry in the Department of Chemistry at the University of Liverpool.

== Education ==
Cooper was educated at the University of Nottingham where he was awarded a PhD for research supervised by Martyn Poliakoff.

== Career ==
After his PhD, Cooper held a number of postdoctoral research positions. He held an 1851 Research Fellowship and a Royal Society NATO Research Fellowship at the University of North Carolina at Chapel Hill where he worked with Joseph DeSimone. He then held a Ramsay Memorial Research Fellowship at the Melville Laboratory for Polymer Synthesis at the University of Cambridge, working with Andrew Bruce Holmes. He moved to the University of Liverpool in 1999 where he has worked ever since.

== Awards and honours ==
Cooper was elected a Fellow of the Royal Society (FRS) in 2015. His nomination reads:

Cooper is distinguished for his outstanding and broad contributions to the design-based discovery of a range of functional materials encompassing polymers prepared using supercritical fluid solvents, templated structures, nanoparticles, and porous solids. In particular, his innovative work has introduced new classes of materials such as porous organic polymers with extended conjugation, and molecular organic crystals with high levels of porosity, which have changed the perception of what is possible in this field. In collaboration with computational chemists, he has developed strategies for the supramolecular synthesis of functional molecular crystals in a more designed way.

Cooper was elected a member of the Academia Europaea in 2017.

- 2019 Awarded the Hughes Medal of the Royal Society.
