= Cambridge Display Technology =

- Company type: Subsidiary
- Industry: Polymer light-emitting diodes
- Founded: 1992; 34 years ago
- Founders: Richard Friend; Donal Bradley; Jeremy Burroughes; Andrew Holmes
- Headquarters: Godmanchester, Cambridgeshire, United Kingdom
- Key people: Jeremy Burroughes (CTO)
- Owner: Sumitomo Chemical
- Website: www.cdtltd.co.uk

Cambridge Display Technology (CDT) is a technology company with head office in Godmanchester, England. It was the first company spun out of the University of Cambridge ever to go public. It was subsequently acquired by Sumitomo Chemical for about $285 million in 2007.

== History ==
Cambridge Display Technology was founded in 1992 in order to commercialise technologies following from the discovery of a new form of electroluminescence in 1989 by Cavendish Laboratory researchers Richard Friend, Donal Bradley, and Jeremy Burroughes together with Department of Chemistry researchers Chloe Jennings and Andrew Holmes.

In 2002, the company was presented with the MacRobert Award by the Royal Academy of Engineering ”for light-emitting polymers”.

CDT's initial public offering (IPO) took place on the NASDAQ stock exchange in December 2004.

In 2007, the company became a subsidiary of Sumitomo Chemical.
