= Eddy Liew =

Malaysian-born British immunologist

Eddy Liew OBE FRS FMedSci FRSE FRCPath
- 刘富友
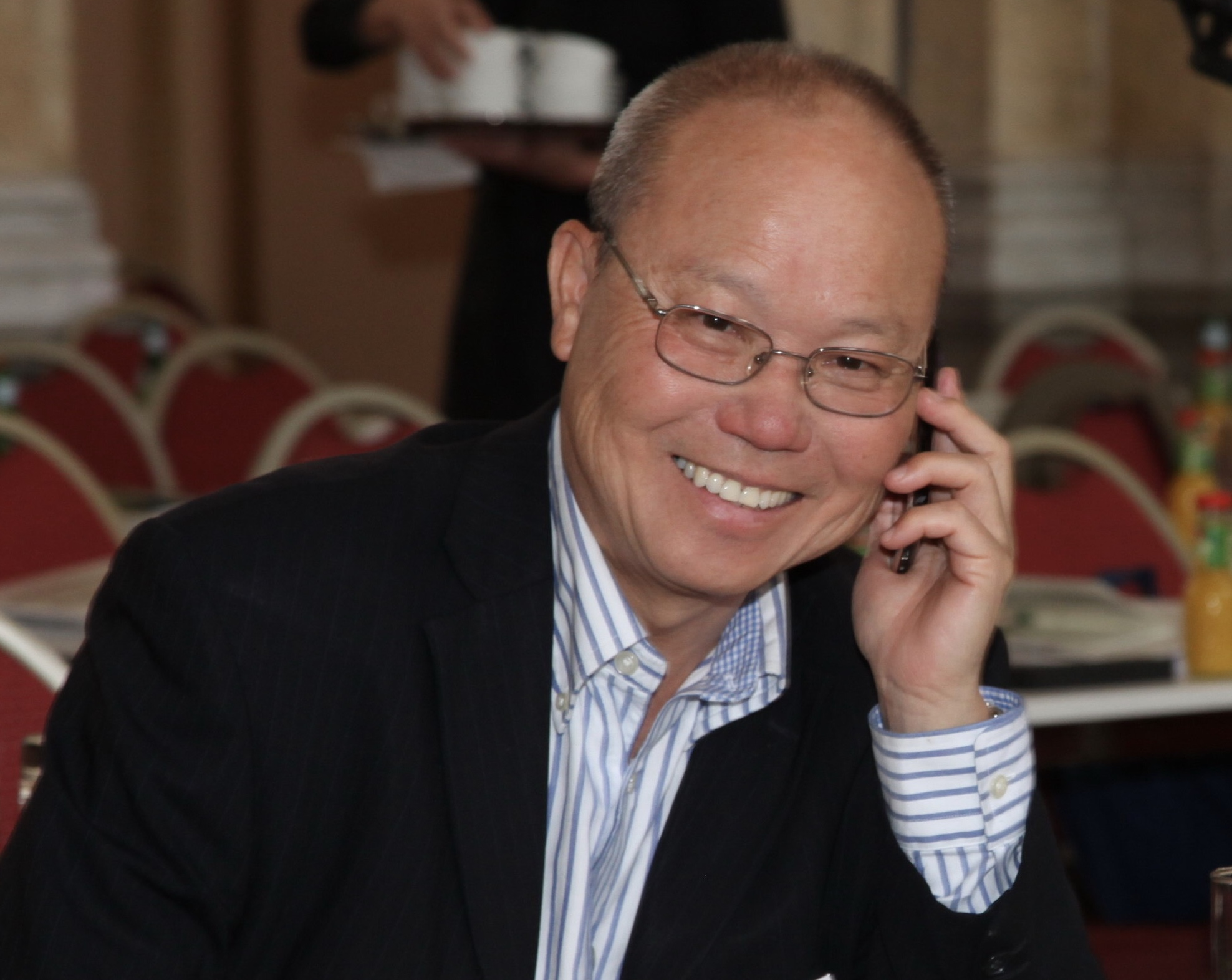
- Born: Eddy Foo Yew Liew; Kuala Lumpur, Malaysia
- Education: Monash University (BSc); Australian National University (PhD, DSc)
- Known for: CD4^{+} T cell heterogeneity; Nitric oxide in immune regulation; IL-15, IL-18 and IL-33 in inflammatory disease
- Awards: Fellow of the Royal Society of Edinburgh (1995); Fellow of the Royal College of Pathologists (1996); Fellow of the Academy of Medical Sciences (1999); Fellow of the Royal Society (2012); Officer of the Order of the British Empire (2018)
- Scientific career
- Fields: Immunology
- Workplaces: University of Glasgow

Eddy Foo Yew Liew (Chinese: 刘富友) is a Malaysian-born British immunologist and Emeritus Professor of Immunology at the University of Glasgow. He is known for his contributions to the understanding of CD4+ T cell heterogeneity, the role of nitric oxide in immune regulation, and the discovery of key cytokine pathways involved in inflammatory disease. Liew is a Fellow of the Royal Society and the Academy of Medical Sciences and was appointed Officer of the Order of the British Empire in 2018 for services to science.

== Early life and education ==
Liew attended Chong Hua High School on a scholarship before completing his secondary education at St. John’s Institution in Kuala Lumpur. In 1965 he received a Colombo Plan scholarship to study chemistry at Monash University in Melbourne, graduating with a BSc (First Class Honours) in 1968. He completed his PhD in microbiology and immunology at the John Curtin School of Medical Research, Australian National University (ANU), in 1972, and was later awarded a DSc by ANU in 1990.

== Career ==
Liew began his academic career in 1972 as a lecturer and later Associate Professor at the University of Malaya in Kuala Lumpur, Malaysia, where he served until 1977.

In 1977, he moved to the United Kingdom to join the Wellcome Research Laboratories in Beckenham. He served as a Senior Scientist and subsequently as the Head of the Department of Immunobiology until 1991.

Liew joined the University of Glasgow in 1991 as the Gardiner Professor and Head of the Department of Immunology, a position he held until 2008. During his tenure, he was the Founding Director of the Glasgow Biomedical Research Centre from 2002 to 2008. He has been an Emeritus Professor of Immunology at the university since 2008.

From 2013 to 2019, Liew served as Editor-in-Chief of the European Journal of Immunology.

== Research ==
Liew’s research has focused on the regulation of immune responses, particularly the heterogeneity of CD4+ T lymphocytes and their roles in infectious and autoimmune diseases. Early in his career, his work with Christopher Parish helped demonstrate that CD4+ T cells involved in cellular and humoral immunity belong to distinct functional subsets, showing that cell-mediated and antibody responses could be dissociated. These findings contributed to the later definition of the Th1 and Th2 paradigm in immunology. He subsequently extended this concept to several infectious diseases relevant to tropical regions, including tapeworm infection, malaria, and leprosy.

During his time at the Wellcome Research Laboratories, Liew investigated CD4^{+} T-cell responses in viral and parasitic infections. He reported that T cells primed by internal influenza proteins could provide heterologous antibody responses and identified distinct CD4^{+} T-cell populations associated with resistance or susceptibility to Leishmania infection. His group also described a population of CD4^{+} suppressor T cells capable of modulating disease-resistant responses, work that preceded later developments in regulatory T-cell biology.

Liew made significant contributions to understanding the role of nitric oxide (NO) in host defence. In collaboration with Salvador Moncada, he demonstrated that NO produced by macrophages is a key effector molecule in the killing of Leishmania parasites in vivo. Using inducible nitric oxide synthase (iNOS) knockout mice, he later showed that NO plays a pivotal role in protection against both Leishmania and malaria by promoting Th1-type immune responses.

At the University of Glasgow, Liew’s research expanded to include cytokine biology in inflammatory disease. Working with Iain McInnes, he identified roles for interleukin-15 (IL-15) and interleukin-18 (IL-18) in rheumatoid arthritis. His group also found that the receptor ST2 is preferentially expressed on Th2 cells, leading to the subsequent identification of interleukin-33 (IL-33) as its ligand. Liew helped characterise the functions of IL-33 in immune regulation and inflammation, contributing to the broader understanding of this cytokine in human disease.

== Honours and awards ==
- Almroth-Wright Lectures, Imperial College London (1991, 1998)
- Fellow of the Royal Society of Edinburgh (FRSE) (1995)
- Fellow of the Royal College of Pathologists (FRCPath) (1996)
- Fellow of the Academy of Medical Sciences (FMedSci) (1999)
- Hamdan Award for Medical Research Excellence, Hamdan Bin Rashid Al Maktoum Foundation (2002)
- Honorary Member, German Society of Immunology (2007)
- Fellow of the Royal Society (FRS) (2012)
- Member of the Medical Research Club (2012)
- Honorary Member, British Society for Immunology (2012)
- Officer of the Order of the British Empire (OBE), for services to science (2018)
