= Government spin-off =

Civilian goods which are the result of military or governmental research

Government spin-off is civilian goods which are the collateral result of military or governmental research. One prominent example of a type of government spin-off is technology that has been commercialized through NASA funding, research, licensing, facilities, or assistance. NASA spin-off technologies have been publicized by the agency in its Spinoff publication since 1976.

The Internet is a specific example of a government spin-off resulting from DARPA funding.

In some fields, such as computer hardware, private sector development has outpaced government and military research, and the government procures commercial off-the-shelf products for many applications.
