= Organic electronics =

Field of materials science

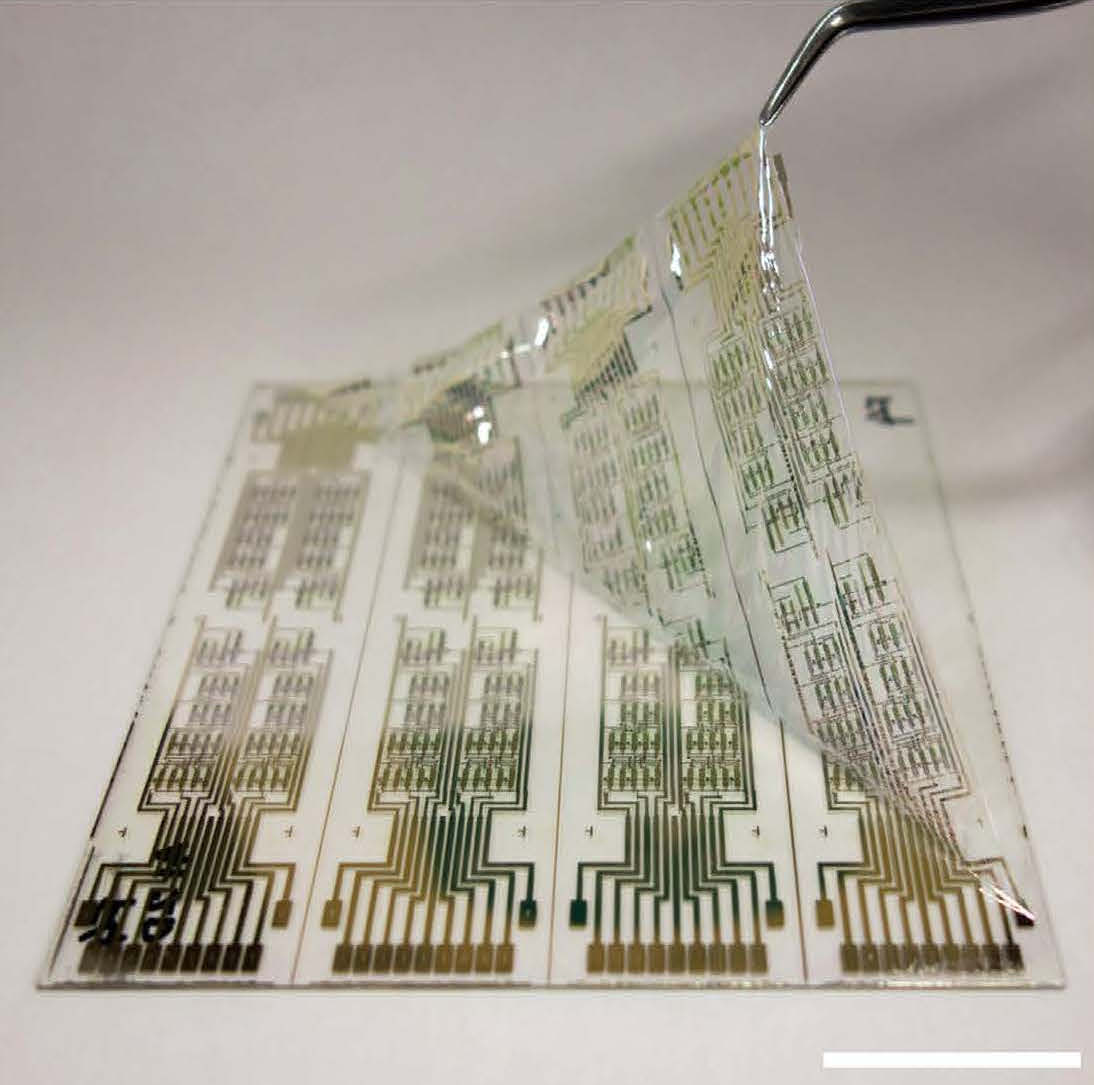
Organic CMOS logic circuit. Total thickness is less than 3 μm. Scale bar: 25 mm

Organic electronics is a field of materials science concerning the design, synthesis, characterization, and application of organic molecules or polymers that show desirable electronic properties such as conductivity. Unlike conventional inorganic conductors and semiconductors, organic electronic materials are constructed from organic (carbon-based) molecules or polymers using synthetic strategies developed in the context of organic chemistry and polymer chemistry.

One of the promised benefits of organic electronics is their potential low cost compared to traditional electronics. The polymeric conductors have attractive properties, which include electrical conductivity (which can be varied by the concentrations of dopants) and comparatively high mechanical flexibility. The challenges in implementing of organic electronic materials are their inferior thermal stability, high cost, and diverse fabrication issues.

== History ==
=== Electrically conductive polymers ===
Traditional conductive materials are inorganic, especially metals such as copper and aluminum as well as many alloys.

In 1862 Henry Letheby described polyaniline, which was subsequently shown to be electrically conductive. Work on other polymeric organic materials began in earnest in the 1960s. For example in 1963, a derivative of tetraiodopyrrole was shown to exhibit conductivity of 1 S/cm (S = Siemens). In 1977, it was discovered that oxidation enhanced the conductivity of polyacetylene. The 2000 Nobel Prize in Chemistry was awarded to Alan J. Heeger, Alan G. MacDiarmid, and Hideki Shirakawa jointly for their work on polyacetylene and related conductive polymers. Many families of electrically conducting polymers have been identified including polythiophene, polyphenylene sulfide, and others.

J.E. Lilienfeld first proposed the field-effect transistor in 1930, but the first OFET was not reported until 1987, when Koezuka et al. constructed one using Polythiophene which shows extremely high conductivity. Other conductive polymers have been shown to act as semiconductors, and newly synthesized and characterized compounds are reported weekly in prominent research journals. Many review articles exist documenting the development of these materials.

In 1987, the first organic diode was produced at Eastman Kodak by Ching W. Tang and Steven Van Slyke.

=== Electrically conductive charge transfer salts ===
In the 1950s, organic molecules were shown to exhibit electrical conductivity. Specifically, the organic compound pyrene was shown to form semiconducting charge-transfer complex salts with halogens. In 1972, researchers found metallic conductivity (conductivity comparable to a metal) in the charge-transfer complex TTF-TCNQ.

=== Light and electrical conductivity ===
André Bernanose was the first person to observe electroluminescence in organic materials. Ching W. Tang and Steven Van Slyke, reported fabrication of the first practical OLED device in 1987. The OLED device incorporated a double-layer structure motif composed of copper phthalocyanine and a derivative of perylenetetracarboxylic dianhydride.

In 1990, a polymer light emitting diodes was demonstrated by Bradley, Burroughes, Friend. Moving from molecular to macromolecular materials solved the problems previously encountered with the long-term stability of the organic films and made high-quality films easy to produce. In the late 1990's, highly efficient electroluminescent dopants were shown to dramatically increase the light-emitting efficiency of OLEDs These results suggested that electroluminescent materials could displace traditional hot-filament lighting. Subsequent research developed multilayer polymers and the new field of plastic electronics and organic light-emitting diodes (OLED) research and device production grew rapidly.

== Conductive organic materials ==
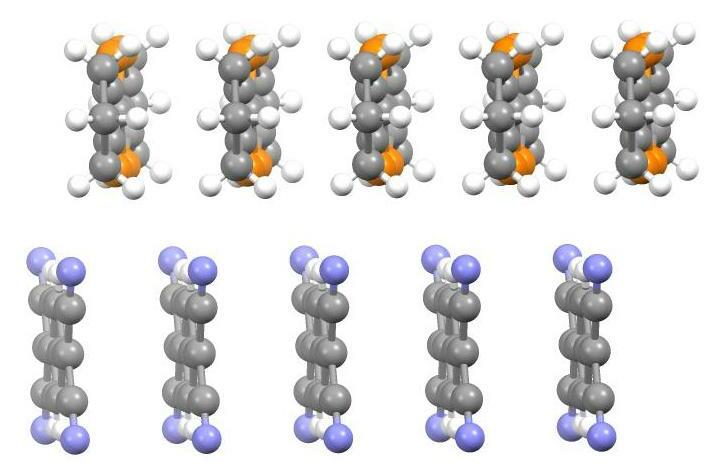
Edge-on view of portion of crystal structure of hexamethylene TTF-TCNQ charge transfer salt, highlighting the segregated stacking. Such molecular semiconductors exhibit anisotropic electrical conductivity.

The foundational characteristic of organic electronics is some degree of electrical conductivity. Electron transport underpins all of the real or aspirational applications.

Organic conductive materials can be grouped into two main classes: polymers and conductive molecular solids and salts. Polycyclic aromatic compounds such as pentacene and rubrene are semiconductor, either with doping or intrinsically

Conductive polymers are often typically intrinsically conductive or at least semiconducting. They sometimes show mechanical properties comparable to those of conventional organic polymers. Both organic synthesis and advanced dispersion techniques can be used to tune the electrical properties of conductive polymers, unlike typical inorganic conductors. Well-studied class of conductive polymers include polyacetylene, polypyrrole, polythiophenes, and polyaniline. Poly(p-phenylene vinylene) and its derivatives are electroluminescent semiconducting polymers. Poly(3-alkythiophenes) have been incorporated into prototypes of solar cells and transistors.

== Organic electronic devices ==
=== Organic light-emitting diode ===
An OLED (organic light-emitting diode) consists of a thin film of organic material that emits light under stimulation by an electric current. A typical OLED consists of an anode, a cathode, OLED organic material and a conductive layer.

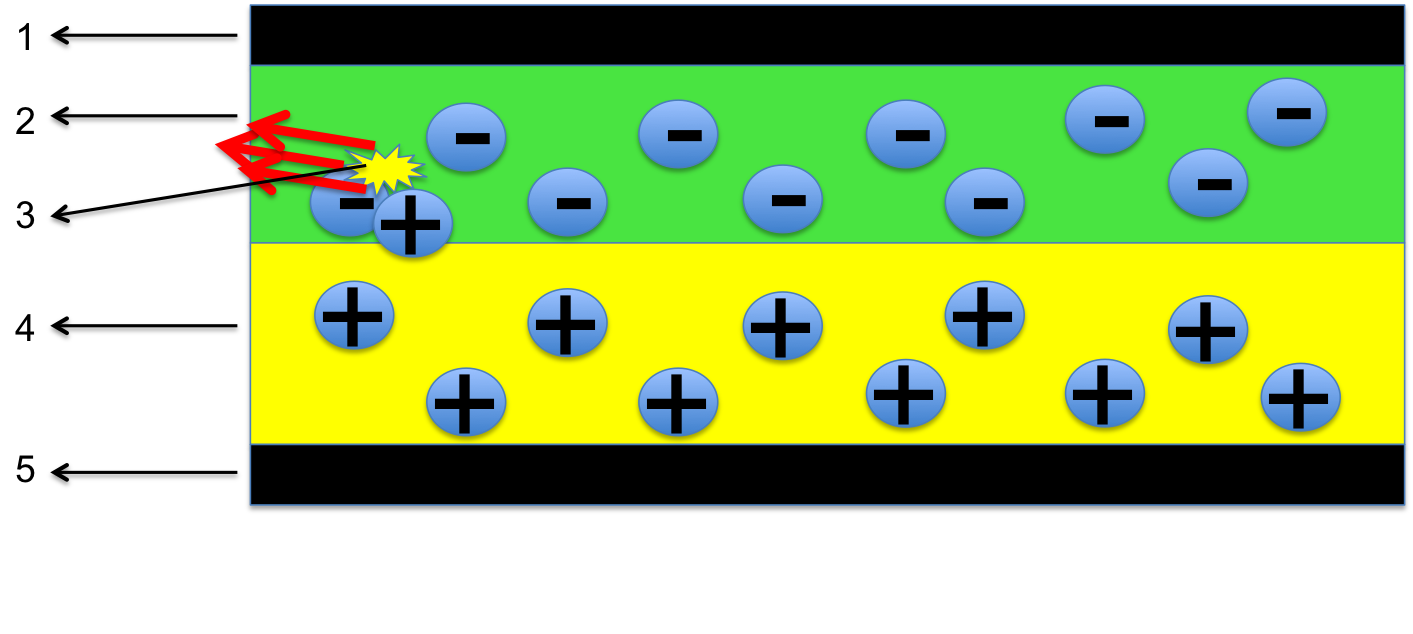
Schematic of a bilayer OLED: 1. Cathode (−), 2. Emissive layer, 3. Emission of radiation, 4. Conductive layer, 5. Anode (+)

OLED organic materials can be divided into two major families: small-molecule-based and polymer-based. Small molecule OLEDs (SM-OLEDs) include tris(8-hydroxyquinolinato)aluminium fluorescent and phosphorescent dyes, and conjugated dendrimers. Fluorescent dyes can be selected according to the desired range of emission wavelengths; compounds like perylene and rubrene are often used. Devices based on small molecules are usually fabricated by thermal evaporation under vacuum. While this method enables the formation of well-controlled homogeneous film; is hampered by high cost and limited scalability. Polymer light-emitting diodes (PLEDs) are generally more efficient than SM-OLEDs. Common polymers used in PLEDs include derivatives of poly(p-phenylene vinylene) and polyfluorene. The emitted color is determined by the structure of the polymer. Compared to thermal evaporation, solution-based methods are more suited to creating films with large dimensions.

=== Organic solar cells ===
Bilayer organic photovoltaic cell

Organic semiconductor diodes convert light into electricity. Figure to the right shows five commonly used organic photovoltaic materials. Electrons in these organic molecules can be delocalized in a delocalized π orbital with a corresponding π* antibonding orbital. The difference in energy between the π orbital, or highest occupied molecular orbital (HOMO), and π* orbital, or lowest unoccupied molecular orbital (LUMO) is called the band gap of organic photovoltaic materials. Typically, the band gap lies in the range of 1-4eV.

The difference in the band gap of organic photovoltaic materials leads to different chemical structures and forms of organic solar cells. Different forms of solar cells includes single-layer organic photovoltaic cells, bilayer organic photovoltaic cells and heterojunction photovoltaic cells. However, all three of these types of solar cells share the approach of sandwiching the organic electronic layer between two metallic conductors, typically indium tin oxide.

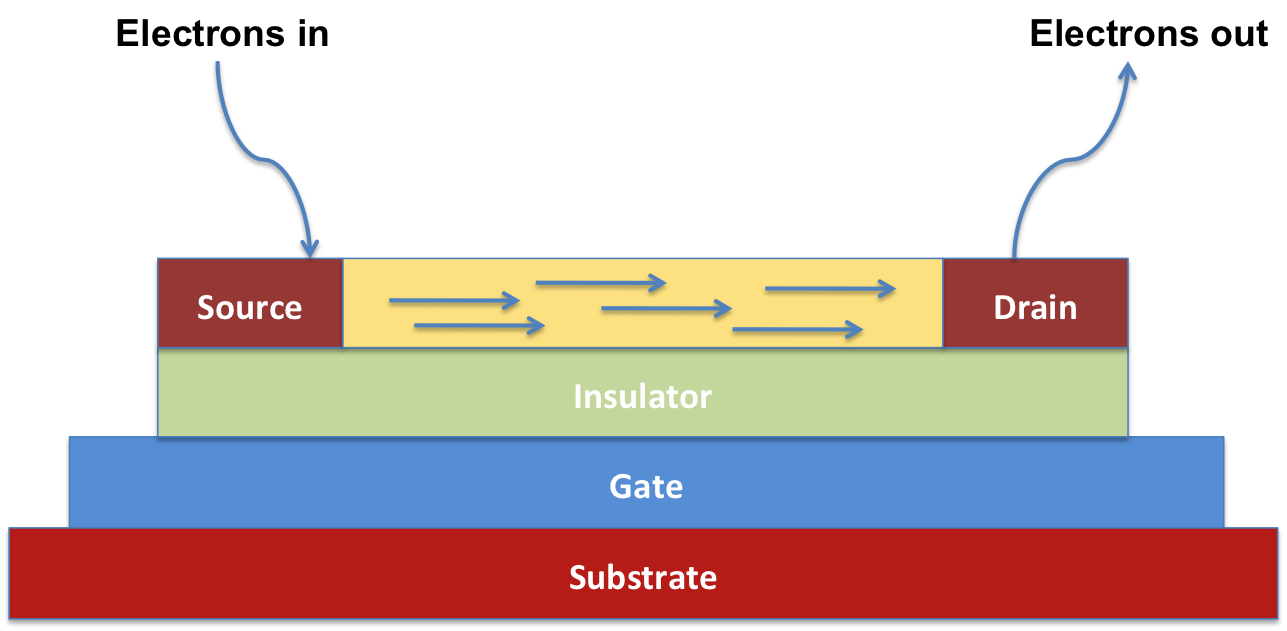
Illustration of thin film transistor device

=== Organic field-effect transistors ===
Rubrene, crystals of which have high hole mobilities, is one of the most studied materials in molecular electronics. It has not however been used in commercial applications.

An organic field-effect transistor (OFET) is a field-effect transistor utilizing organic molecules or polymers as the active semiconducting layer. A field-effect transistor (FET) is any semiconductor material that utilizes electric field to control the shape of a channel of one type of charge carrier, thereby changing its conductivity. Two major classes of FET are n-type and p-type semiconductor, classified according to the charge type carried. In the case of organic FETs (OFETs), p-type OFET compounds are generally more stable than n-type due to the susceptibility of the latter to oxidative damage.

As for OLEDs, some OFETs are molecular and some are polymer-based system. Rubrene-based OFETs show high carrier mobility of 20–40 cm^{2}/(V·s). Another popular OFET material is Pentacene. Due to its low solubility in most organic solvents, it's difficult to fabricate thin film transistors (TFTs) from pentacene itself using conventional spin-cast or, dip coating methods, but this obstacle can be overcome by using the derivative TIPS-pentacene.

An organic field-effect transistor is a three terminal device (source, drain and gate). The charge carriers move between source and drain, and the gate serves to control the path's conductivity. There are mainly two types of organic field-effect transistor, based on the semiconducting layer's charge transport, namely p-type (such as dinaphtho[2,3-b:2′,3′-f]thieno[3,2-b]thiophene, DNTT), and n-type (such phenyl C61 butyric acid methyl ester, PCBM). Certain organic semiconductors can also present both p-type and n-type (i.e., ambipolar) characteristics.

Such technology allows for the fabrication of large-area, flexible, low-cost electronics. One of the main advantages is that being mainly a low temperature process compared to CMOS, different type of materials can be utilized. This makes them in turn great candidates for sensing.

=== Organic thermoelectric materials ===
As manifested in the Peltier effect, thermoelectic materials generate an electrical current. The reverse also applies: an electical current can induce heating. Classical thermolectric materials are heavy metalloid semiconductors, such as alloys of tin, bismuth, and tellurium. Organic compounds also exhibit thermoelectric properties although their performance is inferior to the aforementioned alloys.

== Fabrication methods ==
Small molecule semiconductors are often insoluble, necessitating deposition via vacuum sublimation. Devices based on conductive polymers can be prepared by solution processing methods. Both solution processing and vacuum based methods produce amorphous and polycrystalline films with variable degree of disorder. "Wet" coating techniques require polymers to be dissolved in a volatile solvent, filtered and deposited onto a substrate. Common examples of solvent-based coating techniques include drop casting, spin-coating, doctor-blading, inkjet printing and screen printing. Spin-coating is a widely used technique for small area thin film production. It may result in a high degree of material loss. The doctor-blade technique results in a minimal material loss and was primarily developed for large area thin film production. Vacuum based thermal deposition of small molecules requires evaporation of molecules from a hot source. The molecules are then transported through vacuum onto a substrate. The process of condensing these molecules on the substrate surface results in thin film formation. Wet coating techniques can in some cases be applied to small molecules depending on their solubility.

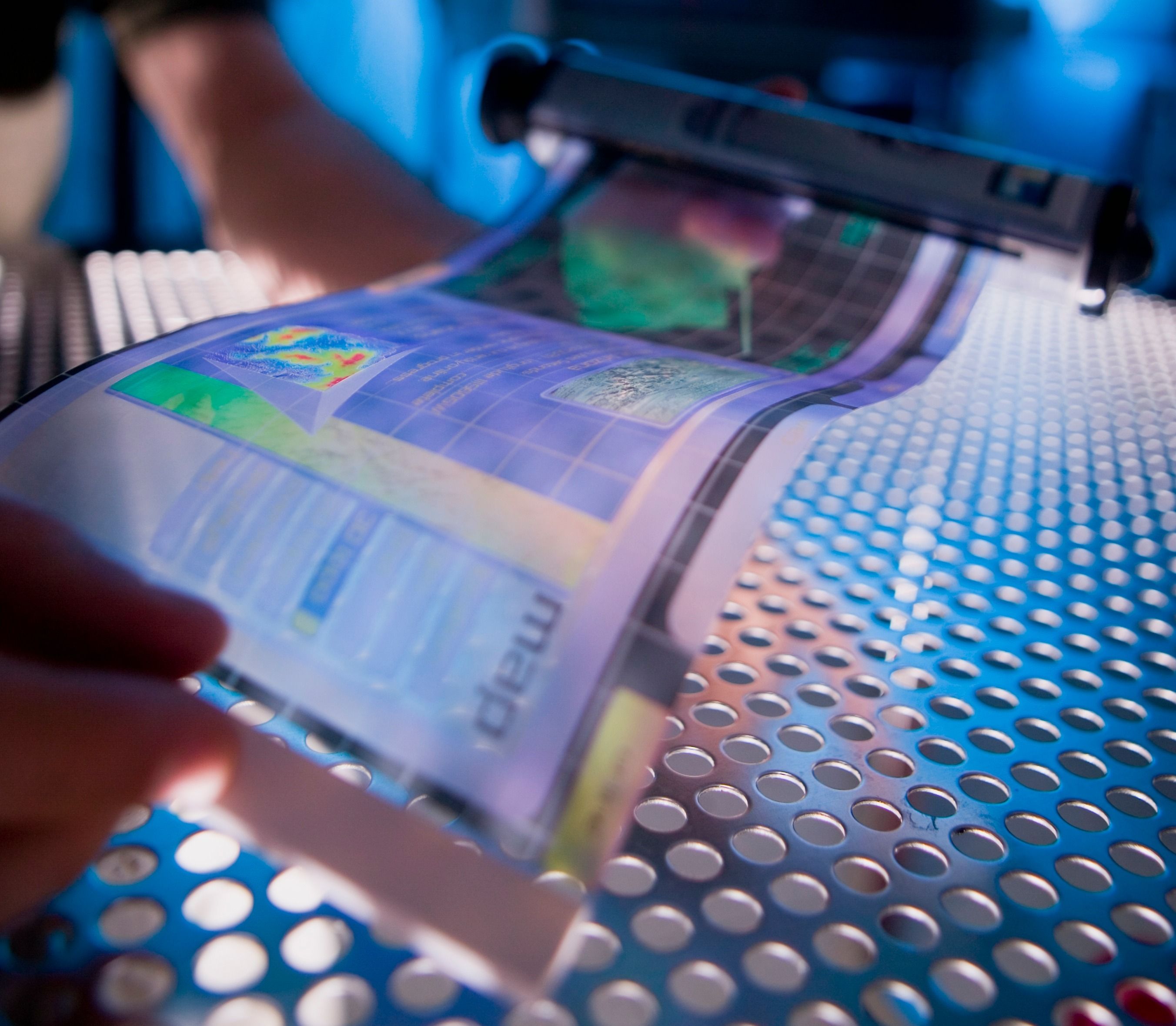
Organics-based flexible display

Five structures of organic photovoltaic materials

Organic solar cells could cut the cost of solar power compared with conventional solar-cell manufacturing. Silicon thin-film solar cells on flexible substrates allow a significant cost reduction of large-area photovoltaics for several reasons:

1. The so-called 'roll-to-roll'-deposition on flexible sheets is much easier to realize in terms of technological effort than deposition on fragile and heavy glass sheets.
2. Transport and installation of lightweight flexible solar cells also saves cost as compared to cells on glass.

Inexpensive polymeric substrates like polyethylene terephthalate (PET) or polycarbonate (PC) have the potential to further reduce costs in photovoltaics. Protomorphous solar cells offer efficiency and cost reduction for photovoltaics via cheap and flexible substrates for large-area production as well as small and mobile applications.

One advantage of printed electronics is that different electrical and electronic components can be printed on top of each other, saving space, increasing reliability, and sometimes achieving complete transparency. One ink must not damage another, and low temperature annealing is vital if low-cost flexible materials such as paper and plastic film are to be used. Industry leaders in this area include Ti, Pixdro, Asahi Kasei, Merck & Co.|Merck, BASF, HC Starck, Sunew, Hitachi Chemical, and Frontier Carbon Corporation, among others. Electronic devices based on organic compounds are now widely used, with many new products under development. For instance, Sony reported the first flexible full-color plastic display made purely of organic materials. OLED-based television screens and other biodegradable electronics based on organic compounds and low-cost organic solar cells are also available.

== Features ==
Conductive polymers are lighter (less dense) than inorganic conductors. They can be flexible. Complex organic compounds are however more expensive than inorganic solids.

Organic electronics not only includes organic semiconductors, but also organic dielectrics, conductors and light emitters.

== See also ==
- Annealing
- Bioplastic
- Carbon nanotube
- Circuit deposition
- Conductive ink
- Flexible electronics
- Laminar
- Melanin
- Organic field-effect transistor (OFET)
- Organic semiconductor
- Organic light-emitting diode
- Photodetector
- Printed electronics
- Radio frequency identification
- Radio tag
- Schön scandal
- Spin coating
