= Richard Friend =

British physicist (born 1953)

Professor Sir Richard Friend FRS HonFInstP FREng
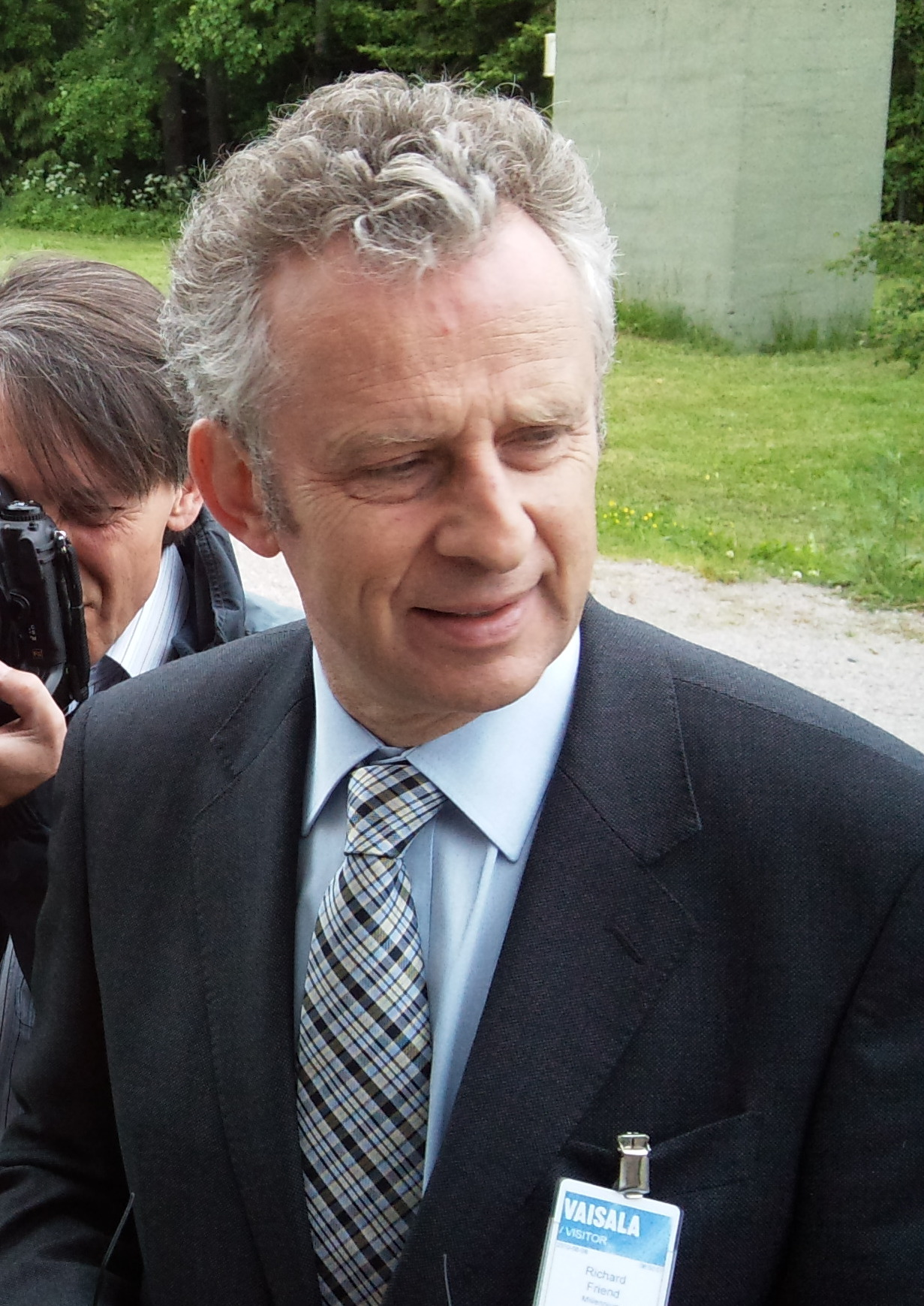
- Friend in Finland in 2010
- Born: Richard Henry Friend; 18 January 1953 (age 73); London
- Education: Trinity College, Cambridge; University of Paris-Sud
- Known for: Plastic electronics; OLED; Organic field-effect transistor
- Spouse: Carol Anne Maxwell (née Beales)
- Awards: Millennium Technology Prize (2010); IOP Swan Medal and Prize (2009); Kt (2003); Faraday Medal (2003); FREng (2002); Rumford Medal (1998); Europhysics Prize (1996); FRS (1993); Isaac Newton Medal (2024)
- Scientific career
- Fields: Optoelectronics; Polymer Light-Emitting Diodes; Thin-Film Field-Effect Transistors; Time-resolved optical spectroscopy; Perovskite solar cell; Photovoltaics
- Workplaces: Eight19 Ltd; Cavendish Laboratory; University of Cambridge; Cambridge Display Technology (CDT); Plastic Logic; St John's College, Cambridge; National University of Singapore
- Thesis: Transport properties and lattice instabilities in one and two dimensional metals (1979)
- Doctoral advisor: Abraham Yoffe; Denis Jérome
- Doctoral students: Henry Snaith; Ana Claudia Arias; Anna Köhler (scientist)
- Website: phy.cam.ac.uk/directory/friendr

Sir Richard Henry Friend (born 18 January 1953) is a British physicist who was the Cavendish Professor of Physics at the University of Cambridge from 1995 until 2020 and is Tan Chin Tuan Centennial Professor at the National University of Singapore. Friend's research concerns the physics and engineering of carbon-based semiconductors. He also serves as Chairman of the Scientific Advisory Board of the National Research Foundation (NRF) of Singapore.

== Education ==
Friend was educated at Rugby School and Trinity College, Cambridge, gaining a PhD in 1979 under the supervision of Abe Yoffe.

== Research ==
Friend's research has been applied to development of polymer field effect transistors, light-emitting diodes, photovoltaic diodes, optically pumped lasing and directly printed polymer transistors. He pioneered the study of organic polymers and the electronic properties of molecular semiconductors. He is one of the principal investigators in the new Cambridge-based Interdisciplinary Research Collaboration (IRC) on nanotechnology and co-founder of Cambridge Display Technology (CDT) and Plastic Logic. Friend has co-authored over 1,000 publications.

== Awards and honours ==
In March 2003 Friend won the IEE's Faraday Medal. He was knighted for "services to physics" in the 2003 Birthday Honours.

Friend received an Honorary Doctorate from Heriot-Watt University in 2006

In 2009, Friend was awarded the Institute of Physics Katharine Burr Blodgett Medal and Prize with Dr David Ffye.

In 2010, Friend was elected as one of the three laureates of Millennium Technology Prize for the development of plastic electronics.

In 2011 he was awarded the Harvey Prize of the Technion in Israel. He is a fellow of St John's College, Cambridge. He was elected a Fellow of the Royal Academy of Engineering (FREng) in 2002.

In 2013, Friend was elected a member of the National Academy of Engineering for contributions to science, engineering, and commercialization of organic polymer semiconductor devices.

His nomination for the Royal Society reads:

Distinguished for his experimental study of the electronic properties of novel materials, principally organic materials, both semiconductors and metals, and inorganic materials with "low-dimensional" electronic structure, including layer structure transition metal dichalcogenides and cuprate superconductors. He established the pressure/temperature phase diagrams for transition metal dichalcogenides, showing conditions for CDW (Charge Density Wave) phases and superconducting phases in TaS2, band crossing transition in TiS2 intercalation of transition metal dichalcogenides with various Lewis bases (alkali metals, amines), and use of controlled charge transfer to the host layer to fine-tune electronic structure to establish conditions for CDW superlattice formation, and mechanisms for charge transport. He has made a major contribution to understanding the conditions for metallic, superconducting, magnetic and insulating ground states in organic charge transfer salts. Established the pressure/temperature phase diagram for the incommensurate and commensurate Charge Density Wave phases of TTF-TCNQ. He made the first observations of de Haas van Alphen oscillations in magnetic susceptibility in an organic metal. He and his group has developed polymer processing techniques for conjugated polymers, and demonstrated non-linear electronic excitations through electrical and optical measurements. First construction of MOSFET (Metal Insulator Semiconductor Field Effect Transistor) with polyacetylene as active semiconductor, and demonstration of novel mechanism of operation, with novel behaviour and made the first construction of efficient, large area, polymeric semi-conductor LED's (Light Emitting Diodes), based on polyphenylene-vinylene.

== Personal life ==
Friend lives in Cambridge with his wife, Carol Anne Maxwell (née Beales) with whom he has two daughters. His brother, Peter Friend, is a transplant surgeon at the University of Oxford.
