= Niobium compounds =

Chemical compounds with at least one niobium atom

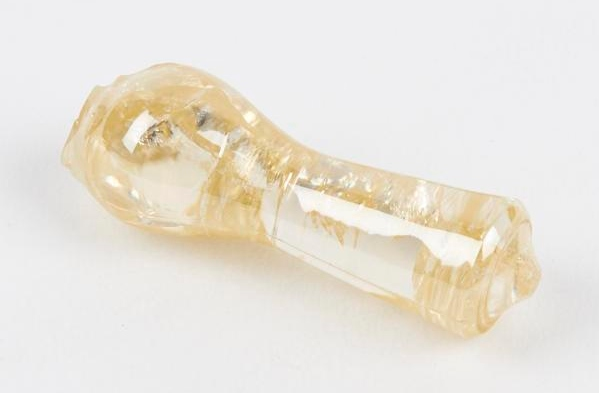
A sample of lithium niobate, a compound of niobium

Niobium compounds are compounds containing the element niobium (Nb). In many ways, niobium is similar to tantalum and zirconium. It reacts with most nonmetals at high temperatures; with fluorine at room temperature; with chlorine at 150 °C and hydrogen at 200 °C; and with nitrogen at 400 °C, with products that are frequently interstitial and nonstoichiometric. The metal begins to oxidize in air at 200 °C. It resists corrosion by fused alkalis and by acids, including aqua regia, hydrochloric, sulfuric, nitric and phosphoric acids. Niobium is attacked by hydrofluoric acid and hydrofluoric/nitric acid mixtures.

Although niobium exhibits all of the formal oxidation states from +5 to −1, the most common compounds have niobium in the +5 state. Characteristically, compounds in oxidation states lower than +5 frequently display Nb–Nb bonding. In aqueous solution, niobium exhibits essentially only the +5 oxidation state. It is readily prone to hydrolysis and is barely soluble in dilute solutions of hydrochloric, sulfuric, nitric and phosphoric acids because of the precipitation of hydrous niobium oxide. Nb(V) is somewhat soluble in alkaline media owing to the formation of soluble polyoxoniobate species.

== Properties of selected niobium compounds ==
Formula	appearance	symmetry	space group	No.	a (nm)	b (nm)	c (nm)	density, g/cm^{3}
NbO_{2}	dark solid	tetragonal	I4_{1}/a	88	1.37		0.599	5.68
LiNbO_{3}	colourless crystals	trigonal	R3c	161	0.51516		1.3869	
2H-NbS_{2}	dark grey solid	hexagonal	P6_{3}/mmc	194	0.3418		1.1860	
2H-NbSe_{2}	dark metallic crystals	hexagonal	P6_{3}/mmc	194	0.34425		1.2547	
NbN	dark solid	cubic	Fm3̅m	225	0.4394			
NbC	grey to black solid	cubic	Fm3̅m	225	0.4469			
NbB_{2}	dark grey solid	hexagonal	P6/mmm	191	0.3116		0.3264	
NbP	grey metallic crystals	tetragonal	I4_{1}md	109	0.3335		1.1379	
Nb_{3}Sn	metallic solid	cubic	Pm3̅n	223	0.5289			

== Halides ==
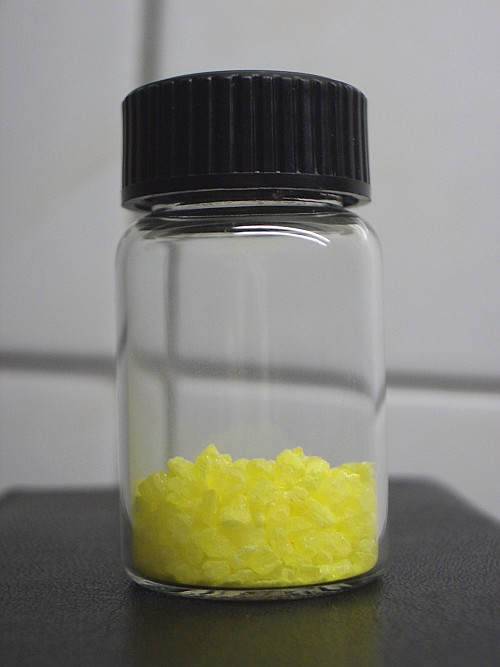
A very pure sample of niobium pentachloride

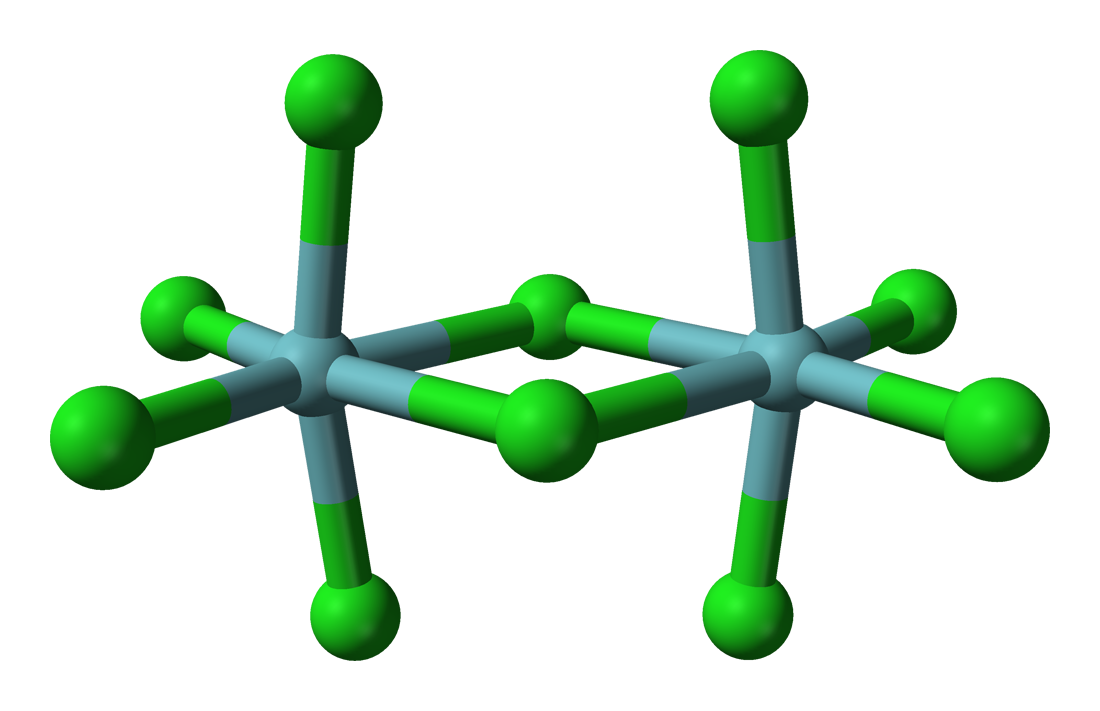
Ball-and-stick model of niobium pentachloride, which exists as a dimer

Niobium forms halides in the oxidation states +5 and +4 as well as diverse substoichiometric compounds. The pentahalides (NbX_{5}) feature octahedral Nb centres. Niobium pentafluoride (NbF_{5}) is a white solid with a melting point of 79.0 °C, whereas niobium pentachloride (NbCl_{5}) is yellow and melts at 203.4 °C. Both are hydrolysed to give oxides and oxyhalides such as NbOCl_{3}.

The pentahalides can be prepared by direct reaction of niobium with the corresponding halogen. Niobium pentachloride, for example, is obtained by chlorination of the metal:

2 Nb + 5 Cl_{2} → 2 NbCl_{5}

The pentachloride is a versatile reagent for the preparation of other niobium compounds, including organometallic derivatives such as niobocene dichloride ((C_{5}H_{5})_{2}NbCl_{2}). The tetrahalides (NbX_{4}) are dark-coloured polymers with Nb–Nb bonds; examples include black hygroscopic niobium tetrafluoride (NbF_{4}) and brown niobium tetrachloride (NbCl_{4}). Lower halides can be obtained by reduction of the corresponding pentahalides.

Anionic halide compounds of niobium are well known, owing in part to the Lewis acidity of the pentahalides. An important example is [NbF_{7}]^{2−}, an intermediate in the separation of niobium and tantalum from their ores. This heptafluoride tends to form the oxopentafluoride more readily than does the corresponding tantalum compound. Other halide complexes include octahedral [NbCl_{6}]^{−}:

Nb_{2}Cl_{10} + 2 Cl^{−} → 2 [NbCl_{6}]^{−}

A variety of reduced niobium halide cluster ions is also known, a prominent example being [Nb_{6}Cl_{18}]^{4−}.

== Oxides and oxyanions ==
Niobium forms three principal binary oxides: niobium monoxide (NbO), niobium dioxide (NbO_{2}), and niobium pentoxide (Nb_{2}O_{5}), corresponding formally to the +2, +4 and +5 oxidation states, respectively. The niobium–oxygen system is complex, and several nonstoichiometric and intermediate oxide phases are also known. The pentoxide is the most stable and technologically important oxide and is a precursor to many other niobium compounds and alloys.

Heating niobium in oxygen gives niobium pentoxide:

4 Nb + 5 O_{2} → 2 Nb_{2}O_{5}

Niobium pentoxide occurs in several polymorphs whose stability depends on temperature and preparation conditions. Reduction of Nb_{2}O_{5} gives lower oxides including NbO_{2} and several intermediate phases, while stronger reduction produces NbO.

Niobates can be prepared by reaction of Nb_{2}O_{5} with basic oxides, carbonates or hydroxides. They comprise a structurally diverse group of ternary and polynary oxides containing Nb(V). Examples include lithium niobate (LiNbO_{3}), potassium niobate (KNbO_{3}) and lanthanum niobate (LaNbO_{4}). Lithium niobate has a trigonally distorted structure and is widely used for its nonlinear optical and piezoelectric properties, while niobates more generally adopt structures including perovskite-related, tungsten-bronze and complex block frameworks.

In strongly alkaline aqueous solution, Nb(V) can form soluble polyoxoniobate ions. Among the best known is the hexaniobate ion [Nb_{6}O_{19}]^{8−}, whose chemistry forms the basis of a large family of condensed niobium oxoanions.

Thin films of niobium(V) oxide can be deposited by chemical vapor deposition or atomic layer deposition, including by thermal decomposition of volatile niobium alkoxides such as niobium(V) ethoxide.

== Chalcogenides ==
Niobium forms binary compounds with sulfur, selenium and tellurium. The most prominent are the layered dichalcogenides NbS_{2}, NbSe_{2} and NbTe_{2}, in which niobium–chalcogen sheets are separated by van der Waals gaps. Their structures and physical properties differ substantially with the chalcogen and with crystal polytype.

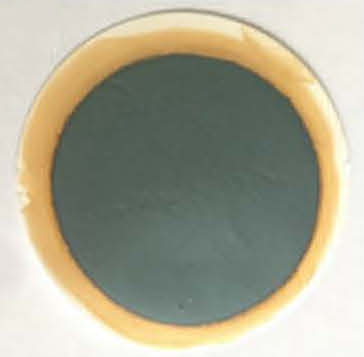
Niobium disulfide film

Niobium disulfide can be prepared by solid-state reaction of elemental niobium and sulfur at elevated temperature. The overall reaction may be represented as:

Nb + 2 S → NbS_{2}

The polytype formed depends strongly on reaction temperature and sulfur content; both 2H-NbS_{2} and 3R-NbS_{2} can be obtained, and mixed-polytype products readily form under intermediate conditions.

Niobium disulfide (NbS_{2}) is a layered metallic solid. Several polytypes are known; phase-pure 2H-NbS_{2} is a bulk superconductor, whereas phase-pure 3R-NbS_{2} has not been observed to superconduct above 1.75 K. Niobium diselenide (NbSe_{2}) is likewise a layered metallic compound. The 2H polytype undergoes both a charge density wave transition and a superconducting transition at low temperature. Niobium ditelluride (NbTe_{2}) has a strongly distorted layered structure consisting of buckled Te–Nb–Te sheets separated by van der Waals gaps.

== Pnictides ==
Niobium forms binary compounds with the pnictogens nitrogen, phosphorus, arsenic and antimony. Many are refractory or metallic solids, while NbP and NbAs have attracted particular interest because of their topological electronic structures.

=== Nitrides ===
Niobium-nitrogen system

Several phases occur in the niobium–nitrogen system. Niobium nitride commonly refers to compositions near NbN, although phases with other Nb:N ratios and several crystal structures are known. Cubic NbN is a hard metallic material that becomes superconducting at low temperatures. Because of its relatively high superconducting transition temperature and rapid electrical response, thin films of NbN are used in superconducting electronics and superconducting nanowire single-photon detectors.

Niobium begins to react appreciably with nitrogen at elevated temperature. Formation of stoichiometric NbN may be represented by:

2 Nb + N_{2} → 2 NbN

In practice, the niobium–nitrogen system contains several intermediate and nonstoichiometric nitride phases, so the product depends on temperature, nitrogen pressure and preparation conditions.

=== Phosphides and heavier pnictides ===
Among the niobium phosphides, niobium phosphide (NbP) is a metallic crystalline compound and a non-centrosymmetric Weyl semimetal. Other binary niobium phosphides, including NbP_{2}, are also known.

Polycrystalline NbP can be prepared by direct reaction of elemental niobium and red phosphorus in an evacuated tube at elevated temperature. Single crystals can subsequently be grown by chemical vapor transport using iodine as the transport agent. The overall reaction for formation of NbP may be represented as:

4 Nb + P_{4} → 4 NbP

Niobium arsenide (NbAs) is another non-centrosymmetric Weyl semimetal. Polycrystalline NbAs can be prepared by heating stoichiometric niobium and arsenic under vacuum, while single crystals have been grown by iodine-mediated chemical vapour transport. Niobium also forms antimonides and other arsenide phases.

== Carbides and borides ==
=== Carbides ===
Niobium carbide (NbC) is a very hard, refractory metallic carbide with the rock-salt structure over a broad composition range. It combines high hardness and melting temperature with good electrical and thermal conductivity. NbC-based materials are used in wear-resistant and cutting-tool applications.

NbC can be produced by direct reaction of niobium with carbon at high temperature:

Nb + C → NbC

Carbothermal reduction of niobium oxide provides another preparation route. Because the carbide has a broad homogeneity range caused by carbon vacancies, its composition may deviate substantially from ideal stoichiometric NbC.

=== Borides ===
Niobium forms several borides, including NbB, Nb_{3}B_{4} and niobium diboride (NbB_{2}). The borides are hard, refractory materials. NbB_{2} has a broad homogeneity range and adopts the hexagonal aluminium diboride structure, consisting of alternating planar layers of niobium atoms and graphite-like boron sheets.

NbB_{2} can be prepared by direct reaction of niobium and boron at high temperature:

Nb + 2 B → NbB_{2}

It can also be produced from niobium oxide by high-temperature reduction routes involving carbon and boron-containing reagents. Superconductivity reported in NbB_{2}-type material is strongly dependent on composition and defect concentration.

== Hydrides ==
Niobium readily absorbs hydrogen, which occupies interstitial sites in the metal lattice. With increasing hydrogen concentration, several ordered hydride phases can form, and their stability depends on hydrogen content and temperature.

Hydrogen uptake may be represented generally as:

Nb + x/2 H_{2} ⇌ NbH_{x}

Hydride phases identified experimentally include β-NbH_{0.89} and hydrogen-rich δ-NbH_{2}. Hydride formation is accompanied by structural changes in the niobium lattice and can influence the material's mechanical and superconducting behaviour. Hydrogen can also be introduced electrochemically; electrochemical hydrogenation has been used to form and characterise both β and δ hydride phases.

== Silicides ==
Several intermetallic compounds occur in the binary niobium–silicon system, principally Nb_{3}Si, Nb_{5}Si_{3} and NbSi_{2}. They are refractory solids with strong Nb–Si bonding and high thermal stability.

Niobium silicides can be produced by reaction of elemental niobium and silicon at high temperature. Nb_{5}Si_{3}, for example, has also been produced from elemental powder compacts by self-propagating high-temperature synthesis. Idealised formation reactions include:

5 Nb + 3 Si → Nb_{5}Si_{3}

Nb + 2 Si → NbSi_{2}

The phase assemblage obtained depends on the overall Nb:Si ratio and thermal history.

Nb_{5}Si_{3} occurs in several structural forms. The low-temperature α form has the Cr_{5}B_{3}-type structure, whereas the high-temperature β form adopts the W_{5}Si_{3}-type structure. A metastable hexagonal γ form is also known, particularly in alloyed systems.

Nb–Si alloys containing a niobium solid solution together with Nb_{5}Si_{3} and related silicides have been investigated as ultra-high-temperature structural materials. In such two-phase materials, Nb_{5}Si_{3} provides high-temperature strength and creep resistance while the niobium-rich solid solution improves room-temperature fracture toughness.

== Intermetallic compounds ==
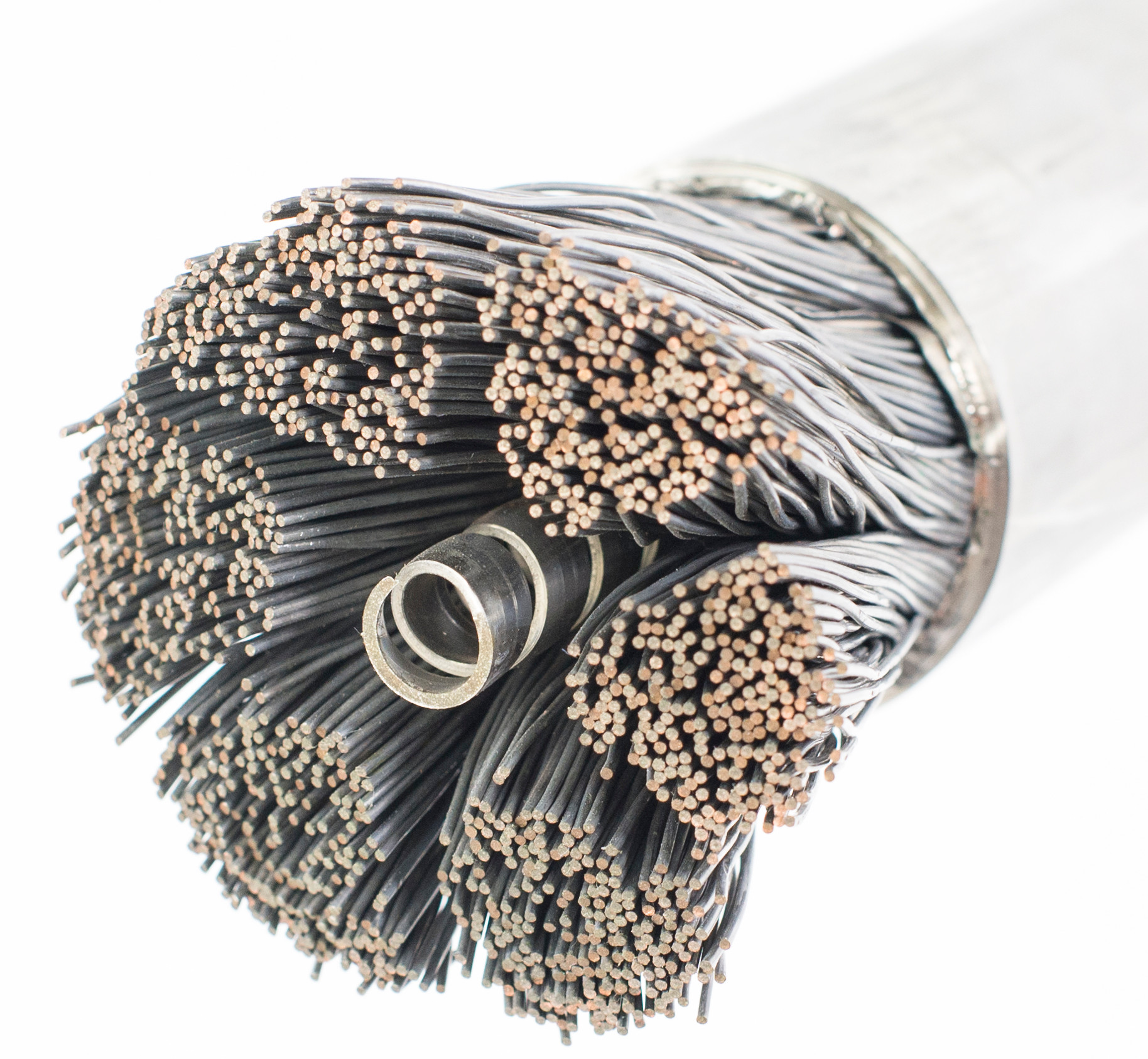
Nb_{3}Sn wire produced for the ITER fusion project

Niobium forms numerous ordered intermetallic compounds with metallic elements. Several niobium-based intermetallics having the cubic A15 structure are important superconductors.

The most technologically important is niobium–tin (Nb_{3}Sn). Nb_{3}Sn has the A15 structure, a superconducting transition temperature near 18 K and an upper critical magnetic field that can approach 30 T. These properties allow Nb_{3}Sn conductors to operate in substantially higher magnetic fields than conventional Nb–Ti conductors, although Nb_{3}Sn is comparatively brittle and strain-sensitive.

Nb_{3}Sn may be formed by reaction and diffusion between niobium and tin at elevated temperature. An idealised overall reaction is:

3 Nb + Sn → Nb_{3}Sn

Commercial conductors are manufactured by several diffusion-based routes, including bronze, internal-tin and powder-in-tube processes.

Another A15 intermetallic superconductor is Nb_{3}Al. It has been investigated for high-field superconducting conductors because of its high critical field and comparatively favourable mechanical behaviour.

== Coordination compounds ==
Niobium forms a large variety of coordination compounds, especially in the +5 and +4 oxidation states. Its chemistry is strongly oxophilic, and Nb(V) behaves as a hard Lewis acid with a strong affinity for oxygen- and fluorine-donor ligands. Hydrolysis of Nb(V) species readily generates oxo and hydroxo compounds, while fluoride stabilises anionic complexes such as [NbF_{7}]^{2−}.

Niobium pentahalides, especially NbCl_{5}, are common starting materials for molecular coordination compounds. Reaction with hard donor ligands provides alkoxides, amides and related Nb(V) complexes, while reduction gives access to lower oxidation states. Oxygen-donor ligands give numerous niobium alkoxides and oxo complexes. Niobium(V) ethoxide is used as a molecular precursor for niobium oxide materials and thin films.

In sol-gel processes, niobium alkoxides undergo hydrolysis to form Nb–OH groups followed by condensation to produce Nb–O–Nb linkages and ultimately oxide networks. Lower oxidation-state coordination compounds and metal–metal bonded species are also known, while Nb–ligand multiple bonding occurs in oxo and imido complexes.

== Organometallic compounds ==
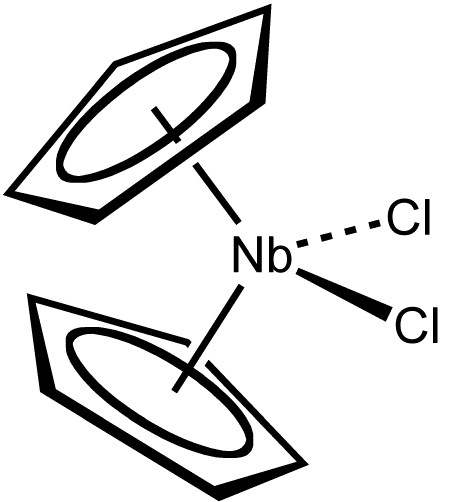
Structure of niobocene dichloride, an organoniobium compound

Organoniobium chemistry comprises compounds containing direct niobium–carbon bonds. Compounds are known in oxidation states ranging from high-valent Nb(V) species to low and negative formal oxidation states.

Cyclopentadienyl derivatives are an important class. Niobocene dichloride, (C_{5}H_{5})_{2}NbCl_{2}, is an Nb(IV) compound obtainable from niobium halide precursors. Numerous substituted cyclopentadienyl complexes have likewise been prepared.

Niobium also forms alkyl, aryl, alkylidene and alkylidyne compounds. Alkylidene complexes of niobium were important in the early development of transition-metal alkylidene chemistry. High-valent alkyl complexes lacking suitable steric or electronic stabilisation can undergo reactions such as beta-hydride elimination.

Low-valent organoniobium chemistry includes carbonyl complexes. Unlike vanadium, niobium does not readily form an isolable neutral homoleptic hexacarbonyl, but salts containing the octahedral hexacarbonylniobate(−I) ion, [Nb(CO)_{6}]^{−}, are well established.

== Alloys ==
Niobium forms numerous technologically important alloys. The most important superconducting alloy is niobium–titanium (Nb–Ti), a ductile body-centred-cubic solid solution that can be fabricated into fine multifilamentary superconducting wire. Nb–Ti remains widely used in superconducting magnet systems, particularly where mechanical ductility and operation in changing magnetic fields are important. Unlike ordered Nb_{3}Sn, Nb–Ti is a solid-solution alloy and therefore exists over a broad range of compositions.

Niobium is also the principal component of refractory alloys intended for elevated-temperature service. Nb–1Zr contains about 1 wt% zirconium and has improved elevated-temperature properties relative to commercially pure niobium; it has been used and investigated for nuclear and space-power applications.

C-103 is a niobium–hafnium–titanium refractory alloy containing approximately 9–11 wt% hafnium and 0.7–1.3 wt% titanium, with niobium forming the balance. It has been extensively used for radiation-cooled rocket thrust chambers and other high-temperature propulsion hardware.

== Applications ==
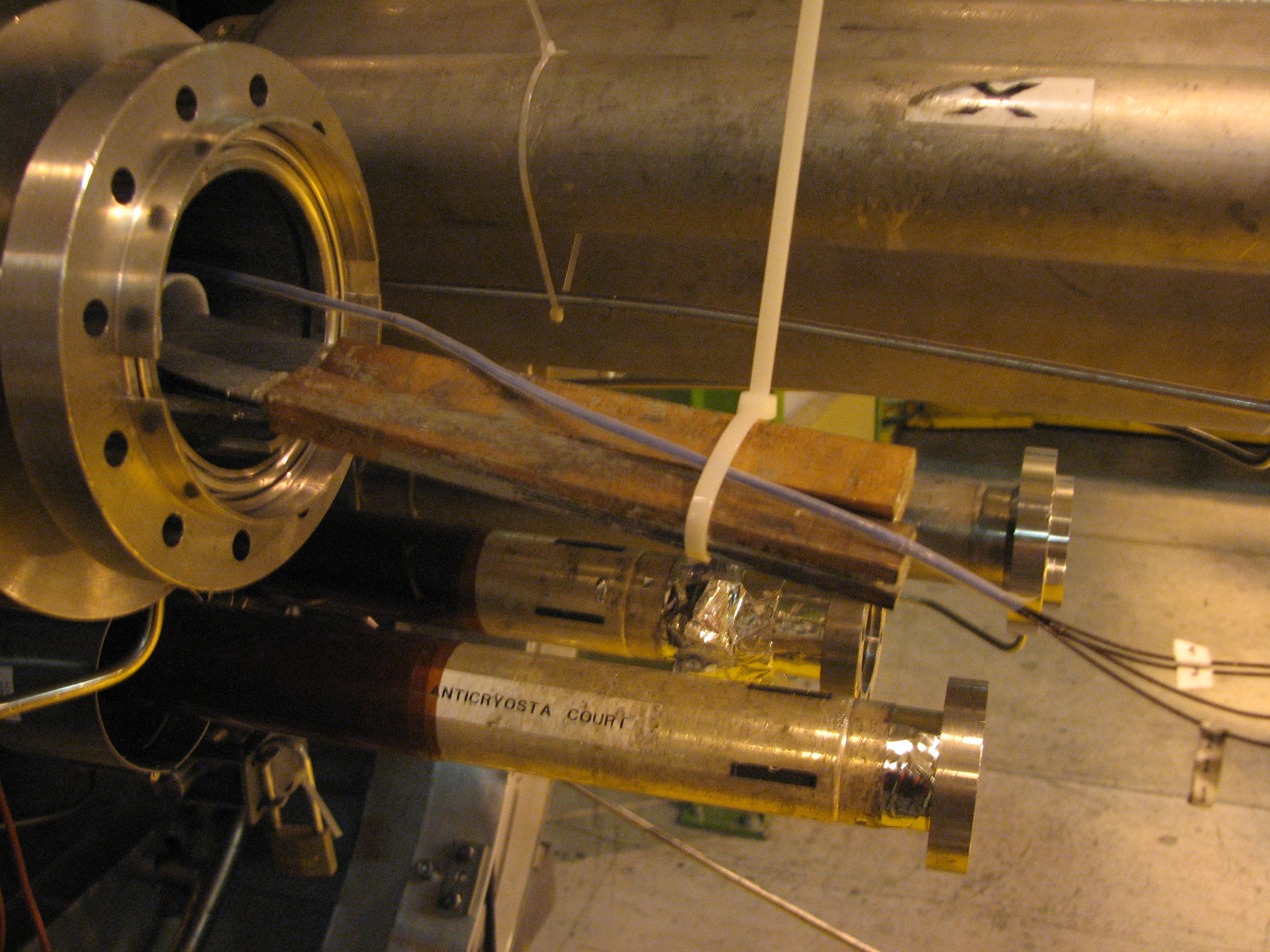
Nb–Ti wires coming out of an LHC dipole magnet

Niobium compounds are used in superconducting, electronic, optical, catalytic and refractory materials. Several niobium-based superconductors are technologically important. Niobium–titanium alloys are widely used in superconducting magnets, while the intermetallic compound niobium–tin (Nb_{3}Sn) is used where higher magnetic fields are required, including accelerator and fusion-magnet systems. Thin films of niobium nitride are used in superconducting electronics and superconducting nanowire single-photon detectors because of their rapid electrical response and relatively high superconducting transition temperature.

Niobates and niobium oxides have important optical and electronic applications. Lithium niobate is a piezoelectric, ferroelectric and nonlinear-optical material used in optical modulators, frequency-conversion devices and related photonic components. Niobium pentoxide is used in optical and electronic thin films and has also been investigated as an electrochromic material. Niobium oxides and related compounds are additionally used as heterogeneous catalysts or catalyst supports, particularly in acid-catalysed and oxidation reactions.

Refractory niobium compounds are valued for their hardness and high-temperature stability. Niobium carbide is used in wear-resistant materials, cutting tools and hardmetal composites, while niobium borides and silicides have been investigated for high-temperature structural applications. In Nb–Si materials, refractory silicide phases such as Nb_{5}Si_{3} provide high-temperature strength and creep resistance, while a niobium-rich metallic phase improves room-temperature toughness. Molecular compounds such as niobium pentachloride and niobium(V) ethoxide are also important as precursors for preparing niobium oxides, thin films and organoniobium compounds.

== Gallery ==
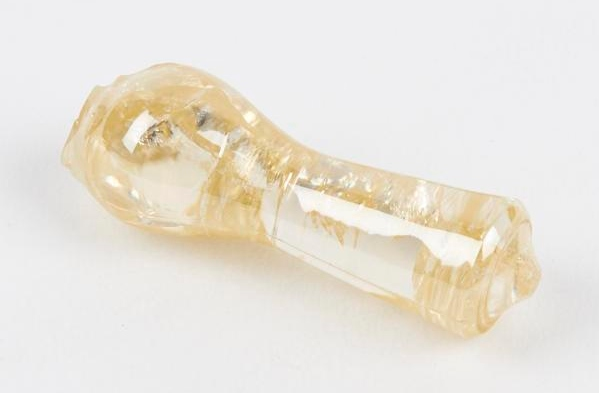
A crystal of lithium niobate

Niobium disulfide powder

A natural grain of niobocarbide, NbC

Niobium(V) oxalate hydrate

== See also ==
- Vanadium compounds
- Tantalum compounds
- Zirconium compounds
- Molybdenum compounds
