= Niobium selenide =

Niobium selenide may refer to:

- Niobium diselenide
- Niobium triselenide
