= Fermi surface nesting =

Property of the Fermi surface in condensed matter physics

Fermi surface nesting is a phenomenon in condensed matter physics in which two or more approximately parallel sections of a Fermi surface can be mapped onto one another by a common wave vector $\mathbf{Q}$. The resulting geometric relationship between different portions of the Fermi surface can enhance the electronic response at the corresponding wave vector and may promote instabilities such as charge-density waves (CDWs), spin-density waves (SDWs), and, in some systems, structural phase transitions.

== History ==
The development of the modern concept of Fermi surface nesting is closely connected to the study of electronic instabilities in low-dimensional conductors. In 1930, Rudolf Peierls studied the electrical and thermal conductivity of metals and discussed the instability of a one-dimensional electronic system to a periodic lattice distortion, now known as Peierls distortion. A one-dimensional metal is unstable towards a periodic lattice distortion with wave vector $2k_F$, which opens an energy gap at the Fermi energy and can transform the system into an insulating state.

In 1959, Walter Kohn showed that the interaction between conduction electrons and lattice vibrations produces a characteristic anomaly in the phonon spectrum at a wave vector related to the geometry of the Fermi surface. This phenomenon, now known as a Kohn anomaly, provided an important connection between Fermi-surface geometry and the momentum-dependent electronic response of a metal. The Peierls instability and Kohn anomaly consequently form important precursors to the modern description of Fermi surface nesting.

== Physical origin ==
In a metal, the Fermi surface separates occupied from unoccupied electronic states at zero temperature. Electronic excitations near the Fermi surface can therefore have a strong influence on the low-energy properties of the material.

Fermi surface nesting occurs when a significant portion of the Fermi surface satisfies an approximate relation of the form

$\varepsilon(\mathbf{k}) \approx \varepsilon(\mathbf{k}+\mathbf{Q}) \approx E_F,$

where $\varepsilon(\mathbf{k})$ is the electronic dispersion, $E_F$ is the Fermi energy, and $\mathbf{Q}$ is the nesting wave vector. In the idealized case of perfect nesting, translating one portion of the Fermi surface by $\mathbf{Q}$ causes it to coincide with another portion.

For a two-dimensional system, for example, two approximately parallel Fermi-surface segments can be connected by the same vector $\mathbf{Q}$:

$$\mathbf{k}_2 \approx \mathbf{k}_1+\mathbf{Q}.$$

Because many electronic states can then be connected by the same momentum transfer, the electronic response can become strongly enhanced at $\mathbf{Q}$.

== Properties ==
=== Electronic susceptibility ===
The influence of Fermi surface nesting can be described using the Lindhard function, which gives the noninteracting electronic susceptibility. In a simplified form, the static susceptibility is

$$\chi_0(\mathbf{q}) = \sum_{\mathbf{k}} \frac{f(\varepsilon_{\mathbf{k}})-f(\varepsilon_{\mathbf{k}+\mathbf{q}})} {\varepsilon_{\mathbf{k}}-\varepsilon_{\mathbf{k}+\mathbf{q}}+i0^+},$$

where $f$ is the Fermi–Dirac distribution. A strong nesting condition can produce an enhancement or peak in $\chi_0(\mathbf{q})$ at the nesting vector $\mathbf{Q}$.

Such an enhancement means that the electronic system has an increased tendency to respond to a perturbation with wave vector $\mathbf{Q}$. If the electronic susceptibility couples sufficiently strongly to another degree of freedom, this enhancement can contribute to the formation of an ordered state.

=== Charge-density waves ===
Fermi surface nesting is often discussed in connection with charge-density waves. A CDW is a spatial modulation of the electronic charge density, which can be represented schematically as

$$\rho(\mathbf{r})=\rho_0+\rho_1\cos(\mathbf{Q}\cdot\mathbf{r}+\phi),$$

where $\mathbf{Q}$ is the CDW wave vector.

If portions of the Fermi surface are nested by $\mathbf{Q}$, electronic states separated by $\mathbf{Q}$ can be efficiently coupled. This can lower the electronic energy when a periodic modulation with the same wave vector develops. In real materials, the electronic modulation is generally coupled to a lattice distortion, so the CDW transition involves both electronic and structural degrees of freedom.

The classic example is a quasi-one-dimensional metal, where the Fermi surface consists of two nearly parallel sheets. For a simple one-dimensional band, the Fermi surface consists of the two points $+k_F$ and $-k_F$. They are connected by

$$Q=2k_F.$$

This produces a particularly strong response at $2k_F$ and is associated with the Peierls transition.

=== Spin-density waves ===
Fermi surface nesting can also enhance the tendency toward a spin-density wave. In an SDW, the spin density varies periodically in space and can be written schematically as

$$\mathbf{S}(\mathbf{r})=\mathbf{S}_0\cos(\mathbf{Q}\cdot\mathbf{r}+\phi).$$

If the nesting vector connects regions of the Fermi surface with favorable spin-dependent interactions, the enhanced susceptibility at $\mathbf{Q}$ can promote magnetic ordering with that wave vector.

Thus, similar Fermi-surface geometry can contribute to either charge or spin ordering, depending on the interactions and microscopic coupling mechanisms present in the material.

== Experimental observation ==
Fermi surface nesting can be investigated using experimental measurements of the electronic structure, such as angle-resolved photoemission spectroscopy (ARPES), quantum oscillations, and measurements of electronic susceptibility.

ARPES can directly map the Fermi surface in momentum space. Comparing different regions of the measured Fermi surface can reveal approximately parallel sections connected by a common wave vector. The nesting vector can then be compared with the ordering wave vector obtained from diffraction or scattering measurements.

In density-wave materials, X-ray diffraction, neutron scattering, and electron diffraction can determine the wave vector of the resulting charge, spin, or structural modulation. Agreement between this wave vector and a strong feature in the electronic susceptibility can indicate that Fermi surface nesting contributes to the instability.

== See also ==
- Kagome metal
- Quantum geometry (condensed matter)
