= Niobium disulfide =

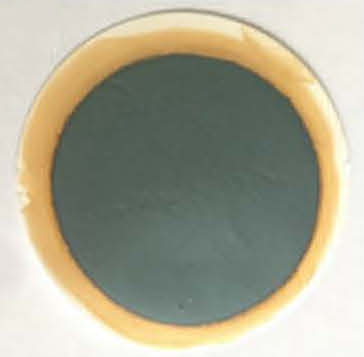
- NbS_{2} exfoliated layer

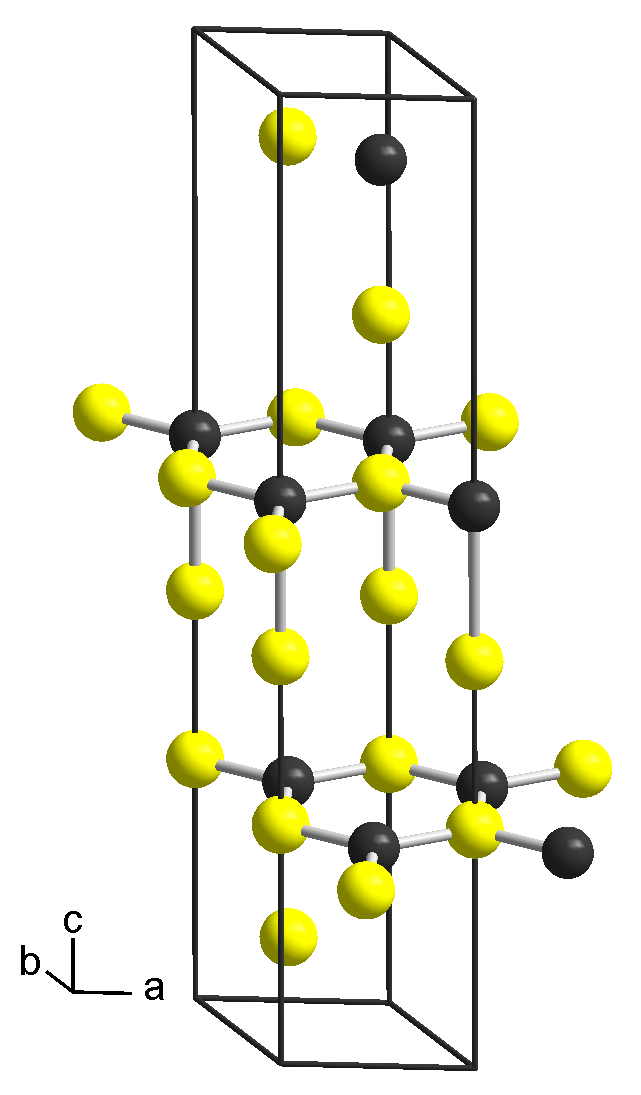
- NbS_{2} structure

Names
- IUPAC name niobium(IV) sulfide, niobium disulfide

Identifiers
CAS Number	12136-97-9
3D model (JSmol)	Interactive image
ChemSpider	9980003
PubChem CID	11805338
CompTox Dashboard (EPA)	DTXSID50473068
- InChI: Key: VRSMQRZDMZDXAU-UHFFFAOYSA-N; InChI=1S/Nb.2S
- SMILES: S=[Nb]=S

Properties
Chemical formula	NbS_{2}
Molar mass	157.038 g/mol
Appearance	Black crystals
Density	4.4 g/cm^{3}
Magnetic susceptibility (χ)	+120·10^{−6} cm^{3}/mol

Structure
Crystal structure	Trigonal, hR9, No. 160
Space group	R3m
Lattice constant	a = 0.333 nm, b = 0.333 nm, c = 1.78 nm α = 90°, β = 90°, γ = 120°
Formula units (Z)	3

Related compounds
Other anions	Niobium diselenide, Niobium ditelluride
Other cations	Vanadium disulfide, Tantalum disulfide
- Except where otherwise noted, data are given for materials in their standard state (at 25 °C [77 °F], 100 kPa). verify (what is ?) Infobox references

Niobium disulfide is the chemical compound with the formula NbS_{2}. It is a black layered solid that can be exfoliated into ultrathin grayish sheets similar to other transition metal dichalcogenides. These layers exhibit superconductivity, where the transition temperature increases from ca. 2 to 6 K with the layer thickness increasing from 6 to 12 nm, and then saturates with thickness.
