= Lanthanum niobate =

Names
- Other names: Lanthanum orthoniobate; Lanthanum(III) niobate(V)

Identifiers
CAS Number	12031-17-3
3D model (JSmol)	Interactive image
- InChI: InChI=1S/La.Nb.4O/q+3;;;3*-1 Key: GIUUOWFJIWCWHY-UHFFFAOYSA-N
- SMILES: [La+3].[O-][Nb]([O-])([O-])=O

Properties
Chemical formula	LaNbO_{4}
Molar mass	295.81 g/mol
Appearance	White crystalline solid

Structure
Crystal structure	Monoclinic, fergusonite type (room temperature)
Space group	I2/a, No. 15
Lattice constant	a = 0.5567 nm, b = 0.5204 nm, c = 1.153 nm α = 90°, β = 94.1°, γ = 90°
Formula units (Z)	4
- Except where otherwise noted, data are given for materials in their standard state (at 25 °C [77 °F], 100 kPa). Infobox references

Lanthanum niobate, also known as lanthanum orthoniobate, is an inorganic compound with the chemical formula LaNbO_{4}. It is a rare-earth niobate containing La^{3+} and Nb^{5+}. At room temperature it has a monoclinic fergusonite-type structure and undergoes a reversible transition to a tetragonal scheelite-type structure at about 500 °C.

LaNbO_{4} is ferroelastic and luminescent. Acceptor-doped forms are also proton conductors at elevated temperatures and have been investigated as electrolytes for proton-conducting solid oxide fuel cells.

== Preparation ==
Lanthanum niobate can be prepared by a conventional solid-state reaction between lanthanum(III) oxide and niobium(V) oxide:

La_{2}O_{3} + Nb_{2}O_{5} → 2 LaNbO_{4}

In solid-state synthesis, La_{2}O_{3} is commonly preheated to remove absorbed water and carbonate before stoichiometric amounts of the oxides are mixed and calcined at high temperature.

A sol–gel route has also been used. Lanthanum nitrate and a niobium alkoxide precursor are incorporated into a citric-acid/ethylene-glycol gel, which is subsequently calcined to produce crystalline LaNbO_{4} powder.

Submicrometre LaNbO_{4} powders have additionally been prepared by spray pyrolysis from solutions containing lanthanum–EDTA and niobium–malate complexes.

== Structure and properties ==
At room temperature, LaNbO_{4} crystallizes in a monoclinic fergusonite-type structure, commonly described in the space-group setting I2/a (No. 15). Representative lattice parameters are a = 5.567 Å, b = 5.204 Å, c = 11.53 Å and β = 94.1°, with four formula units per unit cell.

The room-temperature structure is a distorted derivative of the tetragonal scheelite structure. Lanthanum is surrounded by eight oxygen atoms. Earlier structural descriptions treated Nb^{5+} as tetrahedrally coordinated, although more recent high-resolution diffraction analysis describes the niobium environment as strongly distorted six-coordinate, with four short Nb–O bonds of about 1.9 Å and two much longer contacts of about 2.5 Å.

On heating, LaNbO_{4} undergoes a reversible transition to a tetragonal scheelite-type phase in space group I4_{1}/a (No. 88). The transition occurs at approximately 480–530 °C, with the exact temperature depending on sample history and experimental method.

The low-temperature phase is ferroelastic. Its characteristic domain microstructure forms during the symmetry-lowering tetragonal-to-monoclinic transformation.

== Optical properties ==
LaNbO_{4} is a wide-band-gap material, with an optical band gap reported at approximately 4.8 eV. It displays intrinsic luminescence associated with the niobate groups.

Under ultraviolet excitation, LaNbO_{4} shows broad blue emission. Its luminescence depends strongly on crystallinity and heat-treatment temperature; sol–gel-derived material calcined at about 1100 °C showed substantially stronger absorption and fluorescence than samples treated at lower temperatures.

The compound has consequently been investigated as a host and intrinsic phosphor material for optical and luminescent applications.

== Proton conductivity ==
Undoped LaNbO_{4} is not a particularly strong ionic conductor, but substitution of a small fraction of La^{3+} by lower-valent cations such as Ca^{2+} creates oxygen vacancies. In humid atmospheres, these vacancies can incorporate water and form mobile protonic defects.

Acceptor-doped rare-earth orthoniobates were identified as high-temperature proton conductors in 2006. Among the compounds studied, Ca-doped LaNbO_{4} showed the highest proton conductivity, approximately 10^{−3} S cm^{−1} at around 900–950 °C in humid atmospheres.

Protons dominate the ionic conductivity in wet atmospheres below about 800 °C. At higher temperature and under oxidizing conditions, electronic hole conduction becomes increasingly important.

The monoclinic-to-tetragonal structural transition influences proton mobility. Neutron-diffraction studies associate the change in proton transport with changes in the distance between neighbouring oxygen sites that form possible proton-hopping pathways.

== Applications ==
The chemical stability and proton conductivity of acceptor-doped LaNbO_{4} have led to its investigation as an electrolyte for protonic ceramic fuel cells, hydrogen sensors and related high-temperature electrochemical devices.

Complete fuel cells using Ca-doped LaNbO_{4}-based electrolytes have been demonstrated experimentally. Such cells show good open-circuit voltages and chemical stability, including operation in carbon-dioxide-containing atmospheres, although their performance is limited by the comparatively modest proton conductivity of the electrolyte.
