= Niobium triselenide =

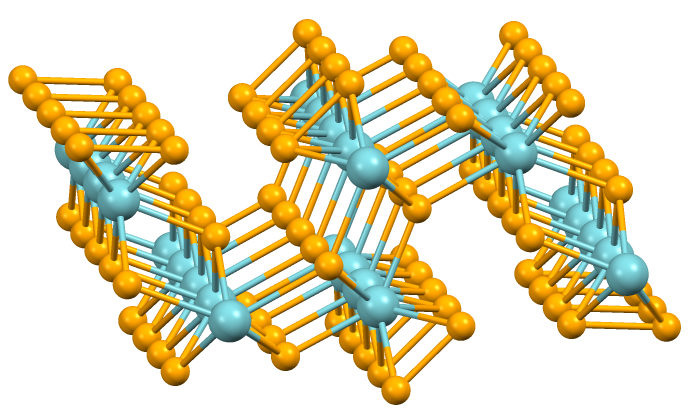

Names
- IUPAC name Niobium triselenide

Identifiers
CAS Number	12034-78-5
3D model (JSmol)	Interactive image
ChemSpider	65793970
PubChem CID	9797567 has charge error
- InChI: InChI=1S/Nb.3Se Key: SURUPJMVQWNAQN-UHFFFAOYSA-N
- SMILES: [Se]=[Nb]1[Se][Se]1

Properties
Chemical formula	NbSe_{3}
Molar mass	1292.425 g/mol
Appearance	black powder, silvery crystals
- Except where otherwise noted, data are given for materials in their standard state (at 25 °C [77 °F], 100 kPa). Infobox references

Niobium triselenide is an inorganic compound belonging to the class of transition metal trichalcogenides. It has the formula NbSe_{3}. It was the first reported example of one-dimensional compound to exhibit the phenomenon of sliding charge density waves. Due to its many studies and exhibited phenomena in quantum mechanics, niobium triselenide has become the model system for quasi-1-D charge density waves.

== Structure ==
Niobium triselenide has a highly anisotropic structure. The Nb^{4+} centers are bound within trigonal prisms defined by six Se ligands. Two pairs of these six Se atoms are bonded to each other to make the polyselenide Se^{2−}_{2}; the other two exist as the monatomic Se^{2−}. The NbSe_{6} prisms form infinite co-parallel chains. Although the prisms share the same coordination, the cell consists of three chain types repeated twice, where each chain is defined by its Se–Se bond length. The Se–Se bond lengths are 2.37, 2.48, and 2.91 angstroms.

== Synthesis ==
The compound is prepared by the solid state reaction by heating niobium and selenium at 600 to 700 °C:

Nb + 3 Se → NbSe_{3}

The resulting black crystals can contain NbSe_{2} impurities. Samples can be purified by chemical vapor transport (CVT) between 650 and 700 °C. The lower limit of CVT was determined by the temperature at which NbSe_{2} is no longer stable.

== Properties ==
Measurements on NbSe_{3} provided significant evidence for charge density wave (CDW) transport, CDW pinning, magnetism, Shubnikov-de Hass oscillations, and the Aharonov–Bohm effect.

The electrical resistivity of most metallic compounds decrease as temperature decreases. For the most part NbSe_{3} follows this trend except two anomalies exist where electrical resistivity reaches two local maxima at 145 K (−128 °C) and 59 K (−214 °C). The maxima result in a sharp decrease in electrical conductivity. This observation is explained by the charge density wave formations that open the gaps in the Fermi surface. The opening causes the 1-D linear system to behave more like a semiconductor and less like a metal, a transition commonly known as Peierls transition. NbSe_{3} continues to be metallic despite the Peierls transition because the charge density wave formation does not completely remove the Fermi surface, a phenomenon known as imperfect Fermi surface nesting.

In the form of nanofibers, NbSe_{3} exhibits superconductivity below 2 K (−271 °C).

Niobium triselenide has been considered as a cathode material for rechargeable lithium batteries due to its fibrous structure, high electrical conductivity, and high gravimetric and volumetric energy densities at room temperature.
