= Robijn Bruinsma =

Dutch physicist

Robijn F. Bruinsma (born May 15, 1953, Haarlem, The Netherlands) is a theoretical physicist and is Professor of Physics at the University of California, Los Angeles and Chair of the Department of Theoretical Physics for the Life Sciences at Leiden University. He is a specialist in the theory of condensed matter.

He has a B.S. degree in Physics from the Vrije Universiteit, Amsterdam (1974), a M.S. in Physics from Utrecht University (1976), and a Ph.D. degree in Physics (1976) from the University of Southern California. His thesis advisor was Kazumi Maki.

== Career ==
His research specialties include the numerical simulation of active proteins and of gene transcription, the self-assembly of viruses, DNA, and chromatin, the electrostatics of DNA and electrical transport along DNA, and adhesion of vesicles and cells.

- Postdoctoral Fellow, Harvard University, 1979–1980.
- Research Associate, Brookhaven National Laboratory, 1980–1982.
- Visiting Scientist, IBM T. J. Watson Research Center, Yorktown, NY, 1982–1984.
- Assistant Professor of Physics, University of California, 1984–1988
- Associate Professor of Physics, University of California, 1988–1990
- Full Professor of Physics, University of California, 1990–present
- Chair, Theoretical Physics for the Life Sciences, Leiden University, 2001-present

== Honors ==
- Pierre et Marie Curie Visiting Professorship (ESPCI) (1994)
- Rothschild Foundation Fellowship (1996)
- Fellow of the American Physical Society (1997)
- Distinguished Lecturer, Collège de France (1999)
