= Kazumi Maki =

Japanese condensed matter physicist

Kazumi Maki (kanji: 真木 和美, kana: まき かずみ Maki Kazumi, January 27, 1936 – September 10, 2008) was a Japanese theoretical physicist, known for his research in "superconductivity, superfluid ³He, and quasi‑one‑dimensional (1D) materials."

== Biography ==
Kazumi Maki was born in Takamatsu, Japan and spent most of his childhood in Kyoto. During World War II he with his family moved to a rural area because of a scarcity of food and the danger of aerial attack. At Kyoto University he received his Ph.D. in 1964 with a thesis on theoretical particle physics, written under the supervision of Hideki Yukawa. Maki was a postdoc at the University of Chicago for the academic year 1964–1965 and an assistant professor from 1965 to 1967 at the University of California, San Diego. From 1967 to 1974 he was a professor at Tohoku University. From 1974 until his death in 2008 he was a professor at the University of Southern California (USC).

His doctoral students include Robijn Bruinsma and Dieter Vollhardt.

== Research ==
In the 1960s and early 1970s his research dealt with BCS theory. In 1968 he published his theoretical analysis predicting an anomalous increase in electrical conductivity caused by superconducting fluctuations just above the critical temperature for a low-temperature superconductor. This predicted increase in conductivity is empirically valid, and the corresponding term in perturbation theory is now called the "Maki–Thompson term." Maki also did research on pair breaking of Cooper pairs and the accompanying gapless (zero gap) superconductivity, in which there is s-wave superconductivity in the presence of impurities, causing a range of temperatures where the energy gap vanishes. He contributed an important review paper Gapless Superconductivity to volume 2 of the classic 2-volume Superconductivity edited by Ronald D. Parks and published by Marcel Dekker in 1969.

From the early 1970s until 1990, Maki investigated superfluid ³He and quasi-one-dimensional materials.

From 1991 until the end of his life, he worked on high-temperature superconductors and investigated the effects of anisotropic ordering parameters on the transport and magnetic properties both in the superconducting state and in the pseudo-gap phase. He saw the pseudo-gap phase as a kind of unconventional spin density wave. As evidence accumulated for d-wave pairing in high-temperature copper oxide superconductors, he pointed out the much greater susceptibility of d-waves to pair breakage from non-magnetic impurities because, unlike conventional s-wave superconductivity, they have topologically protected nodes. He pursued the idea of gossamer superconductivity (d-wave superconductivity in the presence of d-density waves) and half-integer flux quanta in unconventional superconductors.

== Awards ==
Kazumi Maki was elected in 1981 a fellow of the American Physical Society. He received in 1972 the Nishina Memorial Prize. For the academic year 1979–1980 he was a Guggenheim Fellow; during this time he worked with Hagen Kleinert. In 2006 he received from the University of Illinois Urbana-Champaign (UIUC), the John Bardeen Prize with citation "for his work on gapless quasiparticle excitations due to pair-breaking and for elucidating the role of fluctuations".

== Personal life ==
He and his wife, Masako, were aficionados of the Los Angeles Music Center. At their home they frequently played duets, Kazumi's violin and Masako's piano. Upon his death in Los Angeles, he was survived by his widow.
