= Niobium arsenide =

Names
- Other names Niobium monoarsenide

Identifiers
CAS Number	12255-08-2
3D model (JSmol)	Interactive image
ECHA InfoCard	100.032.263
EC Number	235-503-6
PubChem CID	83000
CompTox Dashboard (EPA)	DTXSID701314003
- SMILES: [As]#[Nb]

Properties
Chemical formula	NbAs
Molar mass	167.83 g/mol
Appearance	Dark grey crystalline solid
Density	7.93 g/cm^{3}
Solubility in water	Insoluble in water

Structure
Crystal structure	Tetragonal
Space group	I4_{1}md, No. 109
Lattice constant	a = 0.3452 nm, c = 1.168 nm
Formula units (Z)	4
- Except where otherwise noted, data are given for materials in their standard state (at 25 °C [77 °F], 100 kPa). Infobox references

Niobium arsenide is an inorganic compound of niobium and arsenic with the chemical formula NbAs. It is a dark grey crystalline solid and a member of the non-centrosymmetric transition-metal monopnictides.

NbAs is a Weyl semimetal. In 2015, angle-resolved photoemission spectroscopy measurements directly observed bulk Weyl cones and topological Fermi arc surface states in single crystals of NbAs.

== Preparation ==
Niobium arsenide can be prepared by direct reaction of stoichiometric amounts of elemental niobium and arsenic at high temperature:

Nb + As → NbAs

Polycrystalline NbAs can be prepared by sealing niobium and arsenic under vacuum, initially heating the mixture to about 600 °C and subsequently to approximately 1050 °C.

Single crystals can be grown from the polycrystalline material by chemical vapor transport using iodine as the transport agent. In one method, NbAs and iodine are sealed under vacuum in a quartz ampoule and maintained in a temperature gradient of approximately 1150–1000 °C for several weeks.

== Structure ==
Niobium arsenide crystallizes in the tetragonal crystal system, in the non-centrosymmetric space group I4_{1}md (No. 109).

Room-temperature lattice parameters are approximately a = 3.45 Å and c = 11.68 Å, with four formula units per unit cell.

The structure is closely related to those of tantalum arsenide, niobium phosphide and tantalum phosphide. It lacks inversion symmetry, an important requirement for the Weyl-semimetal electronic structure of NbAs.

== Electronic and physical properties ==
NbAs is a three-dimensional Weyl semimetal. First-principles calculations predict 24 Weyl nodes in the first Brillouin zone, occurring in pairs of opposite chirality. In 2015, angle-resolved photoemission spectroscopy directly observed the bulk Weyl cones and associated surface Fermi arc states.

Its Fermi surface contains both electron and hole pockets. Shubnikov–de Haas oscillation measurements have identified both topologically non-trivial and conventional carrier pockets, with one reported carrier pocket having a Berry phase close to π and an effective mass of about 0.033 times the free-electron mass. Electron–hole compensation contributes to the large magnetoresistance of NbAs.

Under sufficiently strong magnetic fields, NbAs enters the quantum limit. Magneto-optical and transport measurements have observed chiral Landau levels associated with its Weyl bands, while magnetic torque measurements show a pronounced anomaly near the quantum limit.

Infrared and magneto-optical spectroscopy have also been used to probe the interband transitions and Landau-level structure of NbAs.

The surface electronic structure can be modified without eliminating the bulk Weyl nodes. Alkali-metal surface dosing, for example, has been used to induce topological Lifshitz transitions and change the connectivity of the Fermi arcs.

== Thin films ==
Epitaxial and textured thin films of NbAs have been grown on gallium arsenide substrates by molecular-beam epitaxy. Depending on substrate orientation and surface termination, films oriented predominantly along either the [001] or [100] crystallographic directions can be obtained.

Low-temperature resistivities of approximately 420–450 μΩ cm and carrier densities of about 10^{21}–10^{22} cm^{−3} have been measured in such films.
