= Niobium(V) ethoxide =

Niobium(V) Ethoxide
- Skeletal structure of niobium(V) ethoxide

Identifiers
CAS Number	3236-82-6
3D model (JSmol)	Interactive image
ChemSpider	21241198
ECHA InfoCard	100.019.814
EC Number	221-795-2
PubChem CID	520571
CompTox Dashboard (EPA)	DTXSID5062924
- InChI: Key: PNCDAXYMWHXGON-UHFFFAOYSA-N; InChI=1S/5C2H5O.Nb/c5*1-2-3;/h5*2H2,1H3;/q5*-1;+5
- SMILES: CCO[Nb](OCC)(OCC)(OCC)OCC

Properties
Chemical formula	C_{10}H_{25}NbO_{5}
Molar mass	318.209 g mol^{−1}
Appearance	Colourless liquid
Density	1.258 g cm^{−3}
Melting point	5 °C (41 °F; 278 K)
Boiling point	203 °C (397 °F; 476 K)
Solubility in water	N/A; reacts with water

Thermochemistry
Std enthalpy of formation (Δ_{f}H^{⦵}_{298})	−1583.9 ± 2.7 kJ mol^{−1}
Std enthalpy of combustion (Δ_{c}H^{⦵}_{298})	−6872.6 ± 1.7 kJ mol^{−1}

Hazards
- GHS labelling
Pictograms	(GHS02: Flammable) (GHS05: Corrosive)
Signal word	Danger
Hazard statements	H226, H314
Precautionary statements	P210, P233, P240, P241, P242, P243, P260, P264, P280, P301+P330+P331, P303+P361+P353, P304+P340, P305+P351+P338, P310, P321, P363, P370+P378, P403+P235, P405, P501
NFPA 704 (fire diamond)	1 1 1 COR
Flash point	36 °C; 97 °F; 309 K
- Except where otherwise noted, data are given for materials in their standard state (at 25 °C [77 °F], 100 kPa). Infobox references

Niobium(V) ethoxide is an metalorganic compound with formula Nb_{2}(OC_{2}H_{5})_{10}. It is a colorless liquid that dissolves in some organic solvents but hydrolyzes readily. It is mainly used for the sol-gel processing of materials containing niobium oxides.

== Structure ==
Metal alkoxides rarely adopt monomeric structures, and niobium(V) ethoxide is no exception. Early studies established that niobium alkoxides aggregate in solution as dimers. Subsequent crystallographic analysis established that the methoxide and isopropoxides of niobium adopt bioctahedral structures. From a geometric perspective, the ten ethoxide ligand oxygen atoms of the Nb_{2}(OEt)_{10} molecule in solution define a pair of octahedra sharing a common edge with the two niobium atoms located at their centres. From a bonding perspective, each niobium centre is surrounded octahedrally by four monodentate and two bridging ethoxide ligands. The oxygen atoms of the bridging ethoxides are each bonded to both niobium centres, and these two ligands are cis to one another within the coordination sphere. The formula [(EtO)_{4}Nb(μ-OEt)]_{2} more comprehensively represents this dimeric structure, though the simplified formula is commonly used for most purposes.

== Preparation and reactions ==
This compound is prepared by salt metathesis from niobium pentachloride (Et = C_{2}H_{5}):

10 NaOEt + Nb_{2}Cl_{10} → Nb_{2}(OC_{2}H_{5})_{10} + 10 NaCl

The most important reaction of niobium alkoxides is their hydrolysis to produce films and gels of niobium oxides. Although these reactions are complex, they can be described by this simplified equation:

Nb_{2}(OC_{2}H_{5})_{10} + 5 H_{2}O → Nb_{2}O_{5} + 10 HOEt

The thermal decomposition of Nb(OC_{2}H_{5})_{5} begins above 325 – 350 °C. This can be observed with QMS as an increasing amount of ethanol and ethane released. Diethyl ether, C_{2}H_{5}OC_{2}H_{5}, and niobium(V) oxide are the decomposition products released following an atomic layer deposition or chemical vapor deposition process. The decomposition reaction can be summarised as:

Nb_{2}(OC_{2}H_{5})_{10} → Nb_{2}O_{5} + 5 O(C_{2}H_{5})_{2}
