= Niobium ditelluride =

Names
- Other names Niobium telluride

Identifiers
CAS Number	12034-83-2
3D model (JSmol)	Interactive image
ChemSpider	74755
ECHA InfoCard	100.031.636
EC Number	234-813-9
PubChem CID	82842
CompTox Dashboard (EPA)	DTXSID201312171
- InChI: InChI=1S/Nb.2Te Key: PDXRUSDTARHZEW-UHFFFAOYSA-N
- SMILES: [Te]=[Nb]=[Te]

Properties
Chemical formula	NbTe_{2}
Molar mass	348.11 g/mol
Appearance	Black crystals
Density	7.6 g/cm^{3}

Structure
Crystal structure	Monoclinic, distorted 1T type
Space group	C2/m, No. 12
Lattice constant	a = 1.939 nm, b = 0.3642 nm, c = 0.9375 nm α = 90°, β = 134.58°, γ = 90°
- Except where otherwise noted, data are given for materials in their standard state (at 25 °C [77 °F], 100 kPa). Infobox references

Niobium ditelluride is an inorganic compound of niobium and tellurium with the chemical formula NbTe_{2}. It is a black, layered crystalline solid and a member of the transition metal dichalcogenide family. Bulk NbTe_{2} is a semimetal with a distorted monoclinic structure associated with a charge-density wave, and becomes superconducting at very low temperature.

== Preparation ==
Niobium ditelluride can be prepared by direct reaction of stoichiometric quantities of elemental niobium and tellurium at high temperature:

Nb + 2 Te → NbTe_{2}

Single crystals can be grown by chemical vapor transport. Brown obtained crystals of NbTe_{2} by vapor-transport methods for single-crystal X-ray diffraction.

== Structure ==
Bulk NbTe_{2} crystallizes in the monoclinic crystal system, in space group C2/m (No. 12). The lattice parameters reported from single-crystal diffraction are a = 19.39 Å, b = 3.642 Å, c = 9.375 Å and β = 134.58°.

The structure is layered and can be regarded as a strongly distorted derivative of the octahedrally coordinated 1T structure common to transition-metal dichalcogenides. Each niobium atom is surrounded by tellurium atoms in a distorted octahedral environment.

The distortion produces metal–metal bonding in which the niobium atoms form groups of three parallel rows within the layers. Modern diffraction and microscopy studies confirm the monoclinic layered structure and substantial distortion of the tellurium sublattice.

Earlier work reported a rhombohedral or trigonal cell for material in the NbSe_{2}–NbTe_{2} system, but later single-crystal structure determinations established the monoclinic structure for stoichiometric bulk NbTe_{2}.

== Electronic and physical properties ==
NbTe_{2} is a layered semimetal. Electronic-structure calculations and photoelectron spectroscopy show a pseudogap in the electronic density of states near the Fermi level.

Its monoclinic distortion is closely connected with a charge-density wave. Angle-resolved photoemission measurements show that much of the Fermi surface is pseudogapped, while electronic-structure and phonon calculations indicate that Fermi-surface nesting and electron–phonon coupling contribute to the reduction in symmetry and formation of the charge-density-wave state.

Electrical and magnetic measurements on high-quality single crystals show a superconducting transition at approximately 0.5 K. The superconducting state has an unusually small lower critical field, and the measured diamagnetic response is strongly anisotropic because of the layered crystal structure.

Raman spectroscopy and density-functional calculations identify numerous vibrational modes associated with the distorted monoclinic lattice. Ultraviolet photoelectron spectroscopy gives a work function of approximately 5.32 eV, comparable with that of gold. The comparatively high work function and stability of freshly cleaved surfaces have led to interest in NbTe_{2} as a possible electrical-contact material in optoelectronics.

== Monolayers ==
Atomically thin NbTe_{2} has also attracted interest as a two-dimensional material. Several charge-density-wave superstructures have been observed in monolayer NbTe_{2}.

First-principles work published in 2024 indicates that both 1T- and 1H-derived monolayer phases may occur. Calculations associate observed 4 × 1 and 4 × 4 charge-density waves with 1H-derived structures, while other observed phases are consistent with distorted 1T stacking.

The calculations predict competition among charge-density-wave, spin-density-wave and ferromagnetic states and suggest that structural distortions can drive transitions between topological electronic phases.
