= Charge density wave =

Quantum field of electrons

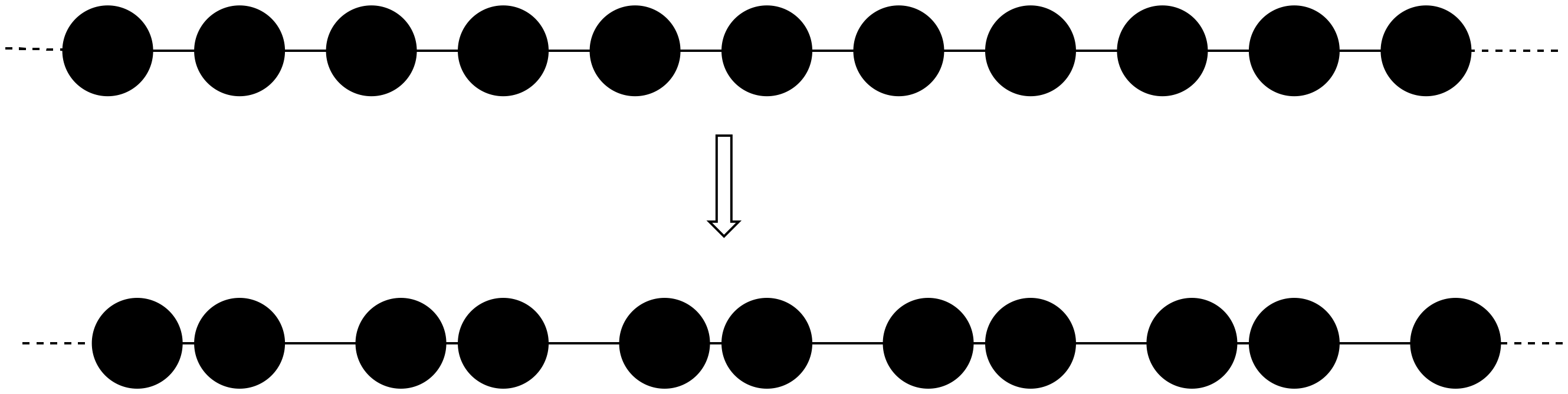
The Peierls transition leads to the formation of a charge density wave in 1D metals.

A charge density wave (CDW) is an ordered quantum fluid of electrons in a linear chain compound or layered crystal. The electrons within a CDW form a standing wave pattern and sometimes collectively carry an electric current. The electrons in such a CDW, like those in a superconductor, can flow through a linear chain compound en masse, in a highly correlated fashion. Unlike a superconductor, however, the electric CDW current often flows in a jerky fashion, much like water dripping from a faucet, due to its electrostatic properties. In a CDW, the combined effects of pinning (due to impurities) and electrostatic interactions (due to the net electric charges of any CDW kinks) likely play critical roles in the CDW current's jerky behavior, as discussed in sections 4 and 5 below.

Most CDWs in metallic crystals form due to the wave-like nature of electrons – a manifestation of quantum mechanical wave–particle duality – causing the electronic charge density to become spatially modulated, i.e., to form periodic "bumps" in charge. This standing wave affects each electronic wave function, and is created by combining electron states, or wavefunctions, of opposite momenta. The effect is somewhat analogous to the standing wave in a guitar string, which can be viewed as the combination of two interfering, traveling waves moving in opposite directions (see interference (wave propagation)).

The CDW in electronic charge is accompanied by a periodic distortion – essentially a superlattice – of the atomic lattice. The metallic crystals look like thin shiny ribbons (e.g., quasi-1D NbSe_{3} crystals) or shiny flat sheets (e.g., quasi-2D, 1T-TaS_{2} crystals). The CDW's existence was first predicted in the 1930s by Rudolf Peierls, who argued that a 1-D metal would be unstable to the formation of energy gaps at the Fermi wavevectors ±k_{F}, which reduce the energies of the filled electronic states at ±k_{F} as compared to their original Fermi energy E_{F}. The temperature below which such gaps form is known as the Peierls transition temperature, T_{P}.

The electron spins are spatially modulated to form a standing spin wave in a spin density wave (SDW). A SDW can be viewed as two CDWs for the spin-up and spin-down sub-bands, whose charge modulations are 180° out-of-phase.

== Fröhlich model of superconductivity ==
In 1954, Herbert Fröhlich proposed a microscopic theory, in which energy gaps at ±k_{F} would form below a transition temperature as a result of the interaction between the electrons and phonons of wavevector Q=2k_{F}. Conduction at high temperatures is metallic in a quasi-1-D conductor, whose Fermi surface consists of fairly flat sheets perpendicular to the chain direction at ±k_{F}. The electrons near the Fermi surface couple strongly with the phonons of 'nesting' wave number Q = 2k_{F}. The 2k_{F} mode thus becomes softened as a result of the electron-phonon interaction. The 2k_{F} phonon mode frequency decreases with decreasing temperature, and finally goes to zero at the Peierls transition temperature. Since phonons are bosons, this mode becomes macroscopically occupied at lower temperatures, and is manifested by a static periodic lattice distortion. At the same time, an electronic CDW forms, and the Peierls gap opens up at ±k_{F}. Below the Peierls transition temperature, a complete Peierls gap leads to thermally activated behavior in the conductivity due to normal uncondensed electrons.

However, a CDW whose wavelength is incommensurate with the underlying atomic lattice, i.e., where the CDW wavelength is not an integer multiple of the lattice constant, would have no preferred position, or phase φ, in its charge modulation $\rho_0 + \rho_1 \cos(2k_{\mathrm F}x-\phi)$. Fröhlich thus proposed that the CDW could move and, moreover, that the Peierls gaps would be displaced in momentum space along with the entire Fermi sea, leading to an electric current proportional to dφ/dt. However, as discussed in subsequent sections, even an incommensurate CDW cannot move freely, but is pinned by impurities. Moreover, interaction with normal carriers leads to dissipative transport, unlike a superconductor.

== Quasi-2D layered materials ==
Several quasi-2D systems, including layered transition metal dichalcogenides, undergo Peierls transitions to form quasi-2D CDWs. These result from multiple nesting wavevectors coupling different flat regions of the Fermi surface. The charge modulation can either form a honeycomb lattice with hexagonal symmetry or a checkerboard pattern. A concomitant periodic lattice displacement accompanies the CDW and has been directly observed in 1T-TaS_{2} using cryogenic electron microscopy. In 2012, evidence for competing, incipient CDW phases were reported for layered cuprate high-temperature superconductors such as YBCO.

== Transport in linear chain compounds ==
Early studies of quasi-1-D conductors were motivated by a proposal, in 1964, that certain types of polymer chain compounds could exhibit superconductivity with a high critical temperature T_{c}. The theory was based on the idea that pairing of electrons in the BCS theory of superconductivity could be mediated by interactions of conducting electrons in one chain with nonconducting electrons in some side chains. (By contrast, electron pairing is mediated by phonons, or vibrating ions, in the BCS theory of conventional superconductors.) Since light electrons, instead of heavy ions, would lead to the formation of Cooper pairs, their characteristic frequency and, hence, energy scale and T_{c} would be enhanced. Organic materials, such as TTF-TCNQ were measured and studied theoretically in the 1970s. These materials were found to undergo a metal-insulator, rather than superconducting, transition. It was eventually established that such experiments represented the first observations of the Peierls transition.

The first evidence for CDW transport in inorganic linear chain compounds, such as transition metal trichalcogenides, was reported in 1976 by Monceau et al., who observed enhanced electrical conduction at increased electric fields in NbSe_{3}. The nonlinear contribution to the electrical conductivity σ vs. field E was fit to a Landau-Zener tunneling characteristic $\approx \exp(-E_0/E)$ (see Landau–Zener formula), but it was soon realized that the characteristic Zener field E_{0} was far too small to represent Zener tunneling of normal electrons across the Peierls gap. Subsequent experiments showed a sharp threshold electric field, as well as peaks in the noise spectrum (narrow band noise) whose fundamental frequency scales with the CDW current. These and other experiments (e.g.,) confirm that the CDW collectively carries an electric current in a jerky fashion above the threshold field.

== Classical models of CDW depinning ==
Linear chain compounds exhibiting CDW transport have CDW wavelengths λ_{cdw} = π/k_{F} incommensurate with (i.e., not an integer multiple of) the lattice constant. In such materials, pinning is due to impurities that break the translational symmetry of the CDW with respect to φ. The simplest model treats the pinning as a sine-Gordon potential of the form $u(\phi) = u_0(1 - \cos\phi)$ , while the electric field tilts the periodic pinning potential until the phase can slide over the barrier above the classical depinning field. Known as the overdamped oscillator model, since it also models the damped CDW response to oscillatory (AC) electric fields, this picture accounts for the scaling of the narrow-band noise with CDW current above threshold.

However, since impurities are randomly distributed throughout the crystal, a more realistic picture must allow for variations in optimum CDW phase φ with position – essentially a modified sine-Gordon picture with a disordered washboard potential. This is done in the Fukuyama–Lee–Rice (FLR) model, in which the CDW minimizes its total energy by optimizing both the elastic strain energy due to spatial gradients in φ and the pinning energy. Two limits that emerge from FLR include weak pinning, typically from isoelectronic impurities, where the optimum phase is spread over many impurities and the depinning field scales as n_{i}^{2} (n_{i} being the impurity concentration) and strong pinning, where each impurity is strong enough to pin the CDW phase and the depinning field scales linearly with n_{i}. Variations of this theme include numerical simulations that incorporate random distributions of impurities (random pinning model).

== Quantum models of CDW transport ==
Early quantum models included a soliton pair creation model by Kazumi Maki and a proposal by John Bardeen that condensed CDW electrons tunnel coherently through a tiny pinning gap, fixed at ±k_{F} unlike the Peierls gap. Maki's theory lacked a sharp threshold field and Bardeen only gave a phenomenological interpretation of the threshold field. However, a 1985 paper by I.V. Krive and A.S. Rozhavsky pointed out that nucleated solitons and antisolitons of charge ±q generate an internal electric field E* proportional to q/ε. The electrostatic energy $\tfrac12 \varepsilon(E \pm E^*)^2$ prevents soliton tunneling for applied fields E less than a threshold E_{T} = E*/2 without violating energy conservation. Although this Coulomb blockade threshold can be much smaller than the classical depinning field, it shows the same scaling with impurity concentration since the CDW's polarizability and dielectric response ε vary inversely with pinning strength.

Building on this picture, as well as a 2000 article on time-correlated soliton tunneling, a more recent quantum model proposes Josephson-like coupling (see Josephson effect) between complex order parameters associated with nucleated droplets of charged soliton dislocations on many parallel chains. Following Richard Feynman in The Feynman Lectures on Physics, Vol. III, Ch. 21, their time-evolution is described using the Schrödinger equation as an emergent classical equation. The narrow-band noise and related phenomena result from the periodic buildup of electrostatic charging energy and thus do not depend on the detailed shape of the washboard pinning potential. Both a soliton pair-creation threshold and a higher classical depinning field emerge from the model, which views the CDW as a sticky quantum fluid or deformable quantum solid with dislocations, a concept discussed by Philip Warren Anderson.

== Aharonov–Bohm quantum interference effects ==
The first evidence for phenomena related to the Aharonov–Bohm effect in CDWs was reported in a 1997 paper, which described experiments showing oscillations of period h/2e in CDW (not normal electron) conductance versus magnetic flux through columnar defects in NbSe_{3}. Later experiments, including some reported in 2012, show oscillations in CDW current versus magnetic flux, of dominant period h/2e, through TaS_{3} rings up to 85 μm in circumference above 77 K. This behavior is similar to that of the superconducting quantum interference device (see SQUID), lending credence to the idea that CDW electron transport is fundamentally quantum in nature (see quantum mechanics).

== See also ==
- Spin density wave
- High-temperature superconductivity
- Fermi surface nesting
