= Niobate =

Group of chemical compounds

A niobate is an oxo-acid salt formed by niobium (Nb). The common forms are metaniobate (NbO_{3}^{−}) and orthoniobate (NbO_{4}^{3−}). The most common niobates are lithium niobate (LiNbO_{3}) and potassium niobate (KNbO_{3}).

== Preparation ==
The niobate can be obtained by reacting niobium pentoxide with the corresponding oxide, hydroxide or carbonate. For example, reacting lithium carbonate with niobium pentoxide would obtain lithium niobate:

Li_{2}CO_{3} + Nb_{2}O_{5} → 2 LiNbO_{3} + CO_{2}↑

Cobalt metaniobate can be obtained by heating a mixture of cobalt monoxide and niobium pentoxide:

CoO + Nb_{2}O_{5} → Co(NbO_{3})_{2}

Lanthanide oxides react with niobium pentoxide to form the lanthanide orthoniobates:

Ln_{2}O_{3} + Nb_{2}O_{5} → 2 LnNbO_{4}
