= Niobium diselenide =

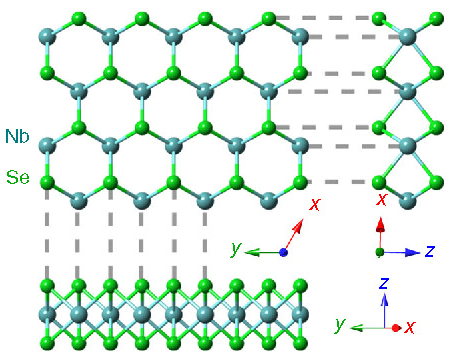
- 2H NbSe_{2} structure

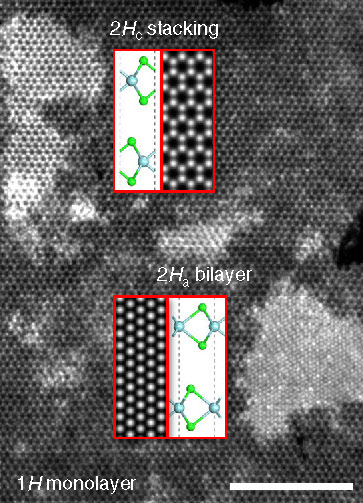
- Electron micrograph showing a local coexistence of different NbSe_{2} structures in one sample

Names
- Other names Niobium(IV) selenide

Identifiers
CAS Number	12034-77-4
3D model (JSmol)	Interactive image
ChemSpider	74754
ECHA InfoCard	100.031.634
EC Number	234-811-8
PubChem CID	82841
CompTox Dashboard (EPA)	DTXSID501014243
- InChI: InChI=1S/Nb.2Se Key: CXRFFSKFQFGBOT-UHFFFAOYSA-N
- SMILES: [Se]=[Nb]=[Se]

Properties
Chemical formula	NbSe_{2}
Molar mass	250.83 g/mol
Appearance	Gray solid
Density	6.3 g/cm^{3}
Melting point	>1300 °C

Structure
Crystal structure	hP6, space group P6_{3}/mmc, No 194
Lattice constant	a = 0.344 nm, c = 1.254 nm
Coordination geometry	Trigonal prismatic (Nb^{IV}); Pyramidal (Se^{2−})

Related compounds
Other anions	Niobium dioxide
Other cations	Molybdenum diselenide Tungsten diselenide
- Except where otherwise noted, data are given for materials in their standard state (at 25 °C [77 °F], 100 kPa). Infobox references

Niobium diselenide or niobium(IV) selenide is a layered transition metal dichalcogenide with formula NbSe_{2}. Niobium diselenide is a lubricant, and a superconductor at temperatures below 7.2 K that exhibits a charge density wave (CDW). NbSe_{2} crystallizes in several related forms, and can be mechanically exfoliated into monatomic layers, similar to other transition metal dichalcogenide monolayers. Monolayer NbSe_{2} exhibits very different properties from the bulk material, such as of Ising superconductivity, quantum metallic state, and strong enhancement of the CDW.

== Synthesis ==
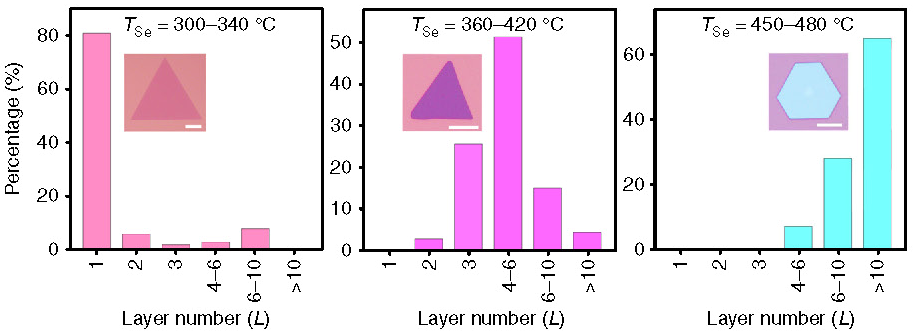
Number of NbSe_{2} layers as a function of Se powder temperature during CVD.

Niobium diselenide crystals and thin films can be grown by chemical vapor deposition (CVD). Niobium oxide, selenium and NaCl powders are heated to different temperatures in the range 300–800 °C at ambient pressure in a furnace that allows maintaining a temperature gradient along its axis. Powders are placed in different locations in the furnace, and a mixture of argon and hydrogen is used as the carrier gas. The NbSe_{2} thickness can be accurately controlled by varying the temperature of selenium powder.

NbSe_{2} monolayers can also be exfoliated from the bulk or deposited by molecular beam epitaxy.

== Structure ==
Niobium diselenide exists in several forms, including 1H, 2H, 4H and 3R, where H stands for hexagonal and R for rhombohedral, and the number 1, 2, etc., refers to the number of Se-Nb-Se layers in a unit cell. The Se-Nb-Se layers are bonded together with relatively weak van der Waals forces, and can be exfoliated into 1H monolayers. They can be offset in a variety of ways to make different crystal structures, the most stable being 2H.

== Properties ==
=== Superconductor ===
NbSe_{2} is a superconductor with a critical temperature T_{C} = 7.2 K. The critical temperature drops when the NbSe_{2} layers are intercalated by other atoms, or when the sample thickness decreases, with T_{C} being ~1 K in a monolayer. Recent studies show infrared photodetection in NbSe_{2} devices.

The superconductivity of NbSe_{2} can be enhanced by vacuum fluctuations. When thin NbSe_{2} devices were embedded in a terahertz split-ring resonator, their superconducting critical temperature increased; a six-layer device showed an increase of approximately 5.4%. The critical current and critical magnetic field were also enhanced near the superconducting transition. The effect was attributed to coupling between electronic degrees of freedom in the superconductor and fluctuating electromagnetic cavity modes, which lowered the energy of the superconducting state.

=== Charge density wave ===
Along with the CDW, the lattice develops a periodic lattice distortion around 26 K. This period is three times that of the crystal lattice, so that there is a 3 by 3 superlattice. There is also a Cooper-pair density wave correlated but out of phase by 2π/3 with the charge-density wave.

=== Friction ===
NbSe_{2} sheets develop higher friction when very thin.

== Intercalation ==
Because the layers in NbSe_{2} are only weakly bonded together, different substances can penetrate between the layers to form well defined intercalation compounds. Compounds with helium, rubidium, transition metals, and post-transition metals have been made. Extra niobium atoms, up to one third extra can be added between the layers.

Extra metal atoms from first transition metal series can intercalate up to 1:3 ratio. they go in between the layers. An interesting stacking-selective self-intercalation phenomenon has been reported in Nb_{1+x}Se_{2} films epitaxially grown using hybrid pulsed laser deposition (hPLD). Presently, the highly intercalated 180°-stacked layers and sparsely intercalated 0°-stacked layers are interspersed on a nanometer length scale. This suggests a possibility of deterministically separating distinct phases to some extent on an appropriate length scale to realize regions of different electronic states.

Intercalating two atoms of helium per formula increases the layer separation to 2.9 and the Se-Se distance to 3.52.

=== Rubidium ===
When rubidium is intercalated, the NbSe_{2} layers separate to accommodate it. Each individual layer is also compressed slightly. The Nb-Se distance stays the same, but the Nb-Nb distance in the layer increases. The Se-Se distance on top and bottom of the layer decreases, and the Nb-Se-Nb angle increases. Extra electron density transfers from the Rb atoms to the niobium layer.

=== Vanadium ===
Vanadium can enter the 2H NbSe_{2} structure to the limit of 1% by substituting for Nb. Between 11% and 20% it forms a 4Hb structure with V in octahedral coordination between layers. Over 30% it forms a 1T structure.

Fermi energy is shifted into the d band.

=== Iron ===
When doped with iron at levels greater than 8% NbSe_{2} can undergo a spin-glass transition at low temperatures.

=== Hydrogen ===
Hydrogen can be intercalated into NbSe_{2} under high pressure and high temperature. Up to 0.9 atoms of hydrogen per formula can be included while retaining the same structure. Over this ratio the structure changes to that of MoS_{2}. At this transition the crystallographic c-axis increases and paramagnetic susceptibility drops to zero. Hydrogen content can go to 5.2 molar ratio at 50.5 atmospheres.

=== Magnesium ===
When magnesium is intercalated, the electron s-states do not overlap with the selenium, and it only has a small effect in reducing the superconducting critical temperature.

== Potential applications ==
Bemol Incorporated manufactured niobium diselenide in the United States for use as a conducting lubricant in vacuum, as it has a wide temperature stability range, very low outgassing, and lower resistance than graphite. NbSe_{2} was used as motor brushes, or embedded in silver to make a self lubricating surface.
