= Niobium phosphide =

Names
- Other names Phosphanylidyneniobium

Identifiers
CAS Number	12034-66-1
3D model (JSmol)	Interactive image
ChemSpider	74753
ECHA InfoCard	100.031.633
EC Number	234-810-2
PubChem CID	82840
CompTox Dashboard (EPA)	DTXSID801014242
- InChI: InChI=1S/Nb.P Key: OATFOCVSPXTLNR-UHFFFAOYSA-N
- SMILES: P#[Nb]

Properties
Chemical formula	NbP
Molar mass	123.88
Appearance	Dark-gray crystals
Density	6,48 g/cm^{3}
Solubility in water	Insoluble

Structure
Crystal structure	Tetragonal
- Except where otherwise noted, data are given for materials in their standard state (at 25 °C [77 °F], 100 kPa). Infobox references

Niobium phosphide is an inorganic compound of niobium and phosphorus with the chemical formula NbP.

== Properties ==
Niobium phosphide is classified as a Weyl semimetal, characterized by linearly dispersing electronic bands near the Fermi level that intersect at discrete points known as Weyl nodes. These nodes arise as a direct consequence of the material’s non-centrosymmetric crystal structure and strong spin–orbit coupling. Experimental studies using angle-resolved photoemission spectroscopy (ARPES) have confirmed the existence of topologically protected surface states, known as Fermi arcs, which connect the projections of Weyl nodes with opposite chirality. The electronic structure gives rise to unusual transport behavior, including extremely large magnetoresistance and high carrier mobility, reflecting the small, compensated electron and hole pockets near the Weyl points and the topological nature of the band structure.

== Structure ==
Niobium phosphide forms dark gray crystals of the non-centrosymmetric, tetragonal system, space group I4_{1}md (No. 109), with cell parameters a = 0.3334 nm, c = 1.1378 nm, Z = 4. The same structure type as other transition-metal monopnictide Weyl semimetals such as TaAs and NbAs. The unit cell contains four formula units, and each niobium atom is coordinated by six phosphorus atoms and vice versa, forming a three-dimensional network of distorted polyhedra.

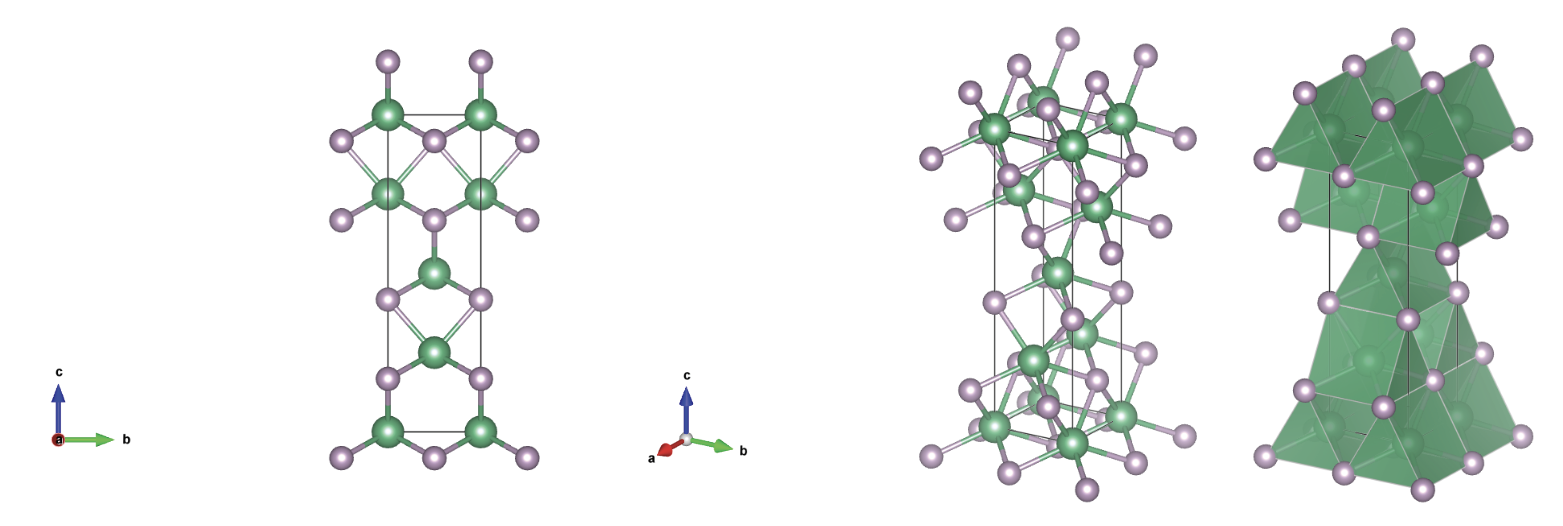
(100) orientation of NbP (left). Polyhedra coordination in NbP (right).

== Synthesis ==
It is prepared by sintering powdered niobium and phosphorus:

4 Nb + P_{4} → 4 NbP

== Uses ==
The compound is a semiconductor used in high power, high frequency applications and in laser diodes.

Niobium phosphate is also being explored specifically for replacing copper as an ultra-thin nanometer film, where it exhibits much lower resistance than the conventional metal.

NbP may be suitable for use in new electronic components.
