= Tetravinylmethane =

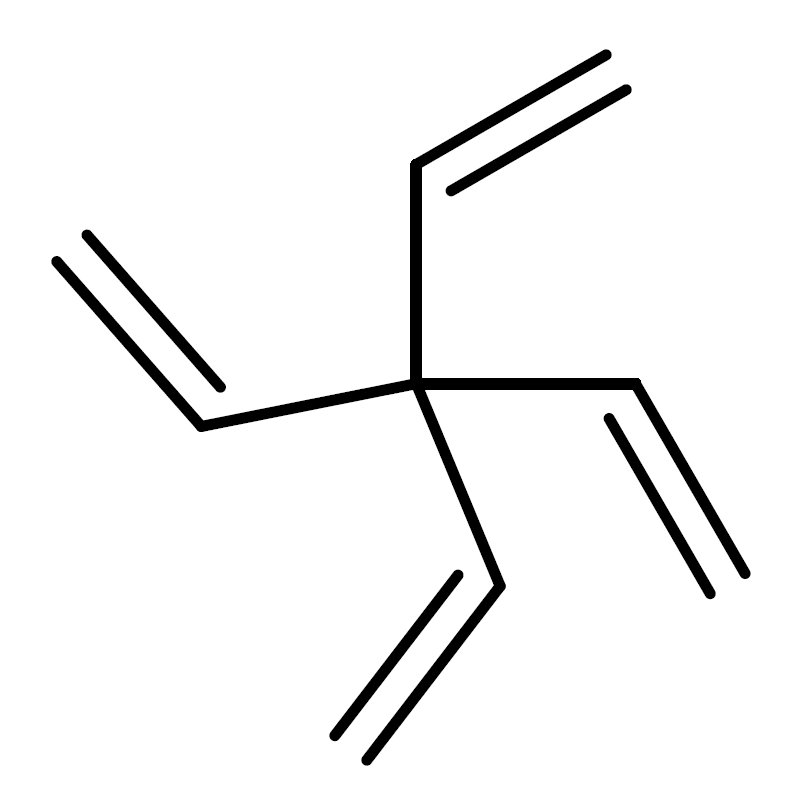

Names
- Preferred IUPAC name 3,3-diethenyl-1,4-pentadiene

Identifiers
| CAS Number | 20685-34-1 |
| 3D model (JSmol) | Interactive image |
| ChemSpider | 124135 |
| PubChem CID | 140742 |
| CompTox Dashboard (EPA) | DTXSID10174741 |
- InChI: InChI=1S/C9H12/c1-5-9(6-2,7-3)8-4/h5-8H,1-4H2 Key: QOYZWSPUVHSVFK-UHFFFAOYSA-N
- SMILES: C=CC(C=C)(C=C)C=C

Properties
| Chemical formula | C_{9}H_{12} |
| Molar mass | 120.195 g·mol^{−1} |

Related compounds
| Related compounds | Tetraethylmethane; Tetraethynylmethane |
- Except where otherwise noted, data are given for materials in their standard state (at 25 °C [77 °F], 100 kPa). Infobox references

Tetravinylmethane is an organic compound with formula C_{9}H_{12}, consisting of four vinyl groups bonded to a central carbon atom. It has been synthesised by several different routes.

== See also ==
- Neopentane
- Tetraethylmethane
- Tetraethynylmethane
- Tetra-tert-butylmethane
- Tetracyclopropylmethane
- Tetraphenylmethane
- Tetrakis(trimethylsilyl)methane
- Methanetetracarboxylate
- Tetramethoxymethane
- Tetrafluoromethane
- Tetrachloromethane
- Tetrabromomethane
- Tetraiodomethane
- Tetraazidomethane
- Tetracyanomethane
- Tetranitromethane
