= Tetraethynylmethane =

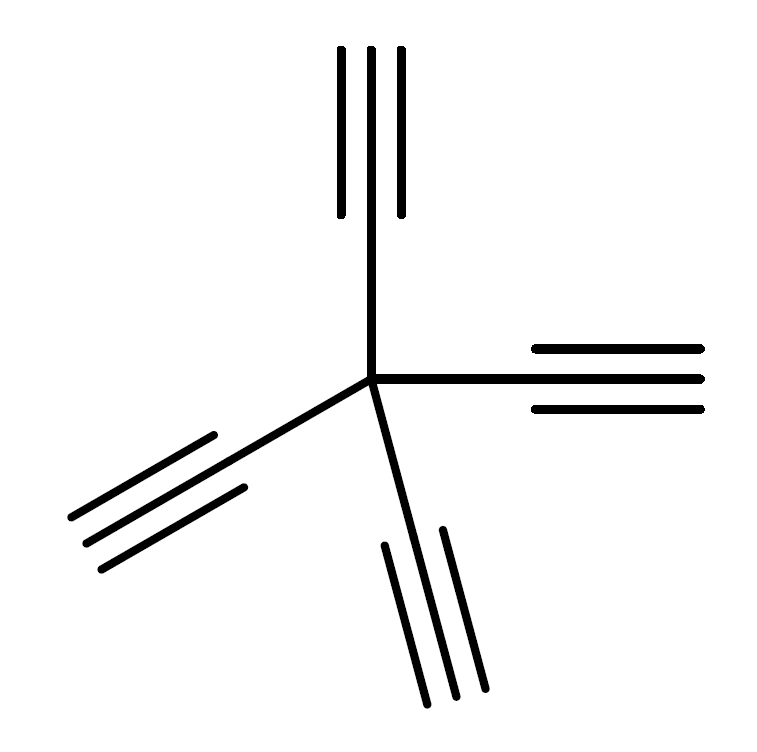

Names
- Preferred IUPAC name 3,3-diethynylpenta-1,4-diyne

Identifiers
3D model (JSmol)	Interactive image
PubChem CID	14934811
- InChI: InChI=1S/C9H4/c1-5-9(6-2,7-3)8-4/h1-4H Key: JVMGUYOVBKXTJL-UHFFFAOYSA-N
- SMILES: C#CC(C#C)(C#C)C#C

Properties
Chemical formula	C_{9}H_{4}
Molar mass	112.131 g·mol^{−1}
- Except where otherwise noted, data are given for materials in their standard state (at 25 °C [77 °F], 100 kPa). Infobox references

Tetraethynylmethane is an organic compound with formula C_{9}H_{4}, consisting of four ethynyl groups bonded to a central carbon atom. It is an alkyne, and one of the most compact possible hydrocarbons. It has been synthesised for potential applications in the synthesis of polymeric forms of carbon such as synthetic diamond and fullerenes.

== See also ==
- Neopentane
- Tetraethylmethane
- Tetravinylmethane
- Tetra-tert-butylmethane
- Tetracyclopropylmethane
- Tetraphenylmethane
- Tetrakis(trimethylsilyl)methane
- Methanetetracarboxylate
- Tetramethoxymethane
- Tetrafluoromethane
- Tetrachloromethane
- Tetrabromomethane
- Tetraiodomethane
- Tetraazidomethane
- Tetracyanomethane
- Tetranitromethane
