= C13H20 =

The molecular formula C_{13}H_{20} (molar mass: 176.303 g/mol) may refer to:

- Tetracyclopropylmethane, a polycyclic hydrocarbon
- A lot of Alkylbenzenes, derivatives of benzene
