= Owen Webster =

American chemist (1929–2018)

Owen Wright Webster
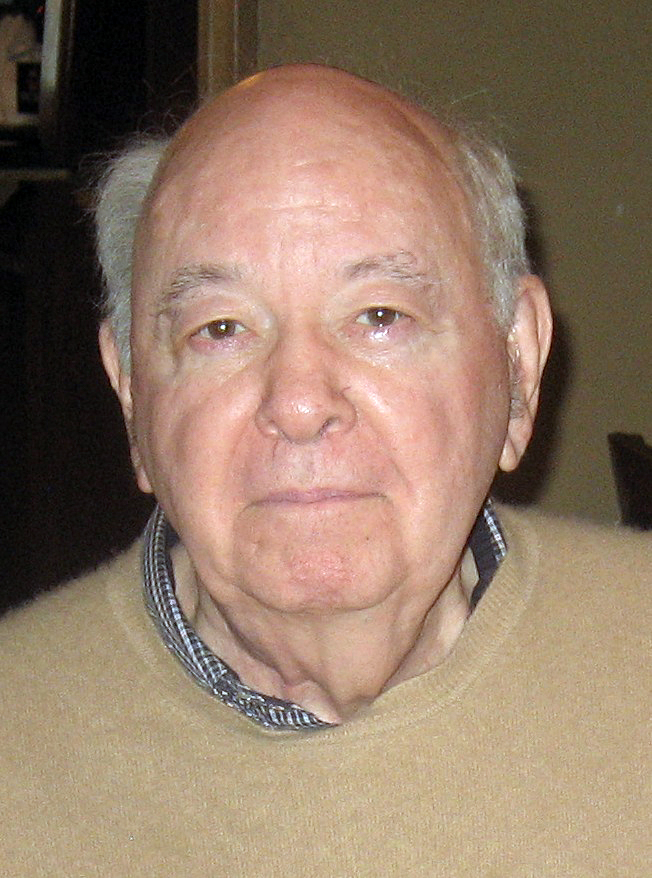
- Owen Webster in 2010
- Born: March 25, 1929; Devil's Lake, North Dakota
- Died: April 13, 2018 (aged 89); Glen Mills, Pennsylvania
- Education: Pennsylvania State University
- Scientific career
- Fields: Chemistry
- Workplaces: DuPont

Owen Wright Webster (March 25, 1929 – April 13, 2018) was an American chemist and distinguished member of the organic and polymer chemistry communities. His polymerization technique for making block copolymer dispersing agents is used by DuPont to make ink-jet printer inks.

Born in Devils Lake, North Dakota, Webster received a Bachelor of Science degree from the University of North Dakota in 1951. He received his Ph.D. in organic chemistry from Pennsylvania State University in 1955 under the direction of L. H. Sommer, known for his silicon mechanistic work. After graduation, Webster joined the Central Research Department of E. I. du Pont de Nemours and Company at the Experimental Station, where he spent his entire industrial career. He is adjunct professor of chemistry at both the University of Alabama and the University of Pennsylvania.

Webster’s early research activities at du Pont involved synthesis of cyanocarbons. His seminal discoveries in this area ranged from tetracyanoethylene oxide, which adds to olefins through its carbon–carbon bond; hexacyanobutadiene, with an oxidation potential near that of bromine; pentacyanocyclopentadiene, an acid as strong as perchloric acid; diiminosuccinonitrile, a remarkable adduct of cyanogen and hydrogen cyanide; and diazodicyanoimidazole, which cleaves to a carbene that forms a bromo ylide with bromobenzene. In other organic research he showed that diazonium compounds undergo 2+4 cycloaddition to dienes.

In the latter half of his stay at DuPont he switched to polymer science where he invented Group Transfer Polymerization (GTP), a new way to control chain architecture of acrylic polymers. DuPont uses this technology to make ink for ink-jet printers, a multimillion-dollar business. In addition to GTP he developed a living cationic polymerization of vinyl ethers. These two discoveries sparked a burst in university activity on controlled polymerization still going on today. He reintroduced the concept of condensation polymerization of A2B type monomers and named them hyperbranched polymers. These systems augment the now popular dendritic polymers. Shortly before retirement he capped his efforts in the materials science area with the synthesis of high surface-area hypercrosslinked polymers by coupling rigid-rod A2 monomers with B3 crosslinkers.

His polymer work led the prestigious American Chemical Society award for Applied Polymer Science in 1993. After a brief period as research supervisor in the 1980s, he accepted a position as DuPont Fellow. Shortly before retirement DuPont honored him with its highest technical award, the Lavoisier Medal.

== Honors and awards ==
- 1993 American Chemical Society award for Applied Polymer Science
- 1995 Chemical Pioneer Award from the American Institute of Chemists
- 1996 Lavoisier Medal from DuPont
