= Methanol dehydrogenase (nicotinoprotein) =

Enzyme

Identifiers
- EC no.: 1.1.99.37

Databases
- IntEnz: IntEnz view
- BRENDA: BRENDA entry
- ExPASy: NiceZyme view
- KEGG: KEGG entry
- MetaCyc: metabolic pathway
- PRIAM: profile
- PDB structures: RCSB PDB PDBe PDBsum
Search
- PMC: articles
- PubMed: articles
- NCBI: proteins

Methanol dehydrogenase (nicotinoprotein) (EC 1.1.99.37, NDMA-dependent methanol dehydrogenase, nicotinoprotein methanol dehydrogenase, methanol:N,N-dimethyl-4-nitrosoaniline oxidoreductase) is an enzyme with systematic name methanol:acceptor oxidoreductase. This enzyme catalyses the following chemical reaction

methanol
+ electron
acceptor
formaldehyde
+ reduced
acceptor

This enzyme contains Zn^{2+} and Mg^{2+}.
