= D-proline dehydrogenase =

Identifiers
- EC no.: 1.5.99.13

Databases
- IntEnz: IntEnz view
- BRENDA: BRENDA entry
- ExPASy: NiceZyme view
- KEGG: KEGG entry
- MetaCyc: metabolic pathway
- PRIAM: profile
- PDB structures: RCSB PDB PDBe PDBsum
Search
- PMC: articles
- PubMed: articles
- NCBI: proteins

D-proline dehydrogenase (EC 1.5.99.13, D-Pro DH, D-Pro dehydrogenase, dye-linked D-proline dehydrogenase) is an enzyme with systematic name D-proline:acceptor oxidoreductase. This enzyme catalyses the following chemical reaction

D-proline
+ electron
acceptor
1-pyrroline-2-carboxylic acid
+ reduced
acceptor

This enzyme is a flavoprotein using flavin adenine dinucleotide.
