= L-Sorbose 1-dehydrogenase =

L-sorbose 1-dehydrogenase

Identifiers
- EC no.: 1.1.99.32

Databases
- IntEnz: IntEnz view
- BRENDA: BRENDA entry
- ExPASy: NiceZyme view
- KEGG: KEGG entry
- MetaCyc: metabolic pathway
- PRIAM: profile
- PDB structures: RCSB PDB PDBe PDBsum
Search
- PMC: articles
- PubMed: articles
- NCBI: proteins

L-Sorbose 1-dehydrogenase (EC 1.1.99.32, SDH) is an enzyme with systematic name L-sorbose:acceptor 1-oxidoreductase. This enzyme catalyses the following chemical reaction:

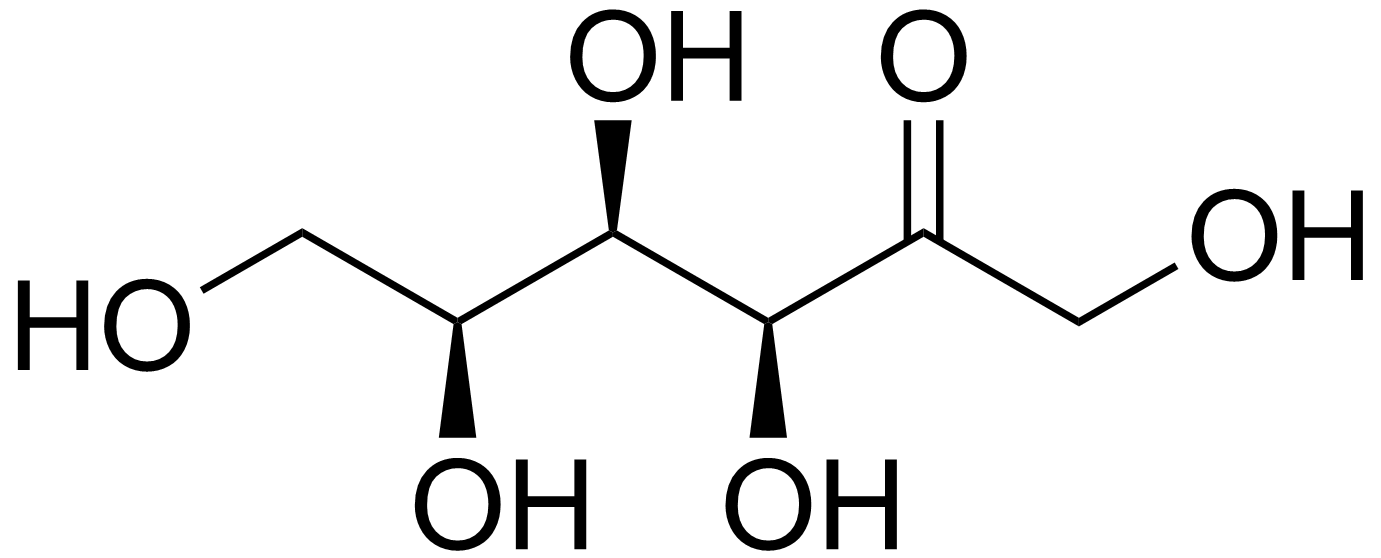
L-sorbose
+ electron
acceptor
L-sorbosone
+ reduced
acceptor

The product, L-sorbosone, is an intermediate in bacterial 2-keto-L-gulonic-acid formation. Co^{2+} stimulates activity of this membrane-bound enzyme, while Cu^{2+} acts as an inhibitor.
