= Cyanocarbon =

Class of organic compounds containing cyanide

In organic chemistry, cyanocarbons are a group of chemical compounds that contain several cyanide functional groups. Such substances generally are classified as organic compounds, since they are formally derived from hydrocarbons by replacing one or more hydrogen atoms with a cyanide group. One of the simplest member is C(CN)_{4} (tetracyanomethane, also known as carbon tetracyanide). Organic chemists often refer to cyanides as nitriles.

In general, cyanide is an electronegative substituent. Thus, for example, cyano-substituted carboxylic acids tend to be stronger than the parent acids. The cyanide group can also stabilize anions by delocalizing negative charge as revealed by resonance structures.

== Definition and examples ==
Cyanocarbons are organic compounds bearing enough cyano functional groups to significantly alter their chemical properties.

Illustrative cyanocarbons:

- Tetracyanoethylene (TCNE), which forms a stable radical anion [C_{2}(CN)_{4}]^{•}^{−}, unlike most derivatives of ethylene.
- Pentacyanocyclopentadiene, which is 10^{27} times more acidic than cyclopentadiene, and whose conjugate base is air-stable, unlike the cyclopentadienyl anion.
- Tetracyanoethylene oxide, an electrophilic epoxide that undergoes ready scission of its C–C bond.
- Tetracyanoquinodimethane (TCNQ), C_{6}H_{4}-para-(C(CN)_{2})_{2}, which reduces to a stable radical anion, unlike most quinones.
- Cyanoform (tricyanomethane), HC(CN)_{3}.
- Pentacyanopropenide, [(NC)_{2}C=C(CN)−C(CN)_{2}]^{−}.
