= Thiophene-2-carbonyl-CoA monooxygenase =

thiophene-2-carbonyl-CoA monooxygenase

Identifiers
- EC no.: 1.14.99.35

Databases
- IntEnz: IntEnz view
- BRENDA: BRENDA entry
- ExPASy: NiceZyme view
- KEGG: KEGG entry
- MetaCyc: metabolic pathway
- PRIAM: profile
- PDB structures: RCSB PDB PDBe PDBsum
- Gene Ontology: AmiGO / QuickGO
Search
- PMC: articles
- PubMed: articles
- NCBI: proteins

In enzymology, a thiophene-2-carbonyl-CoA monooxygenase (EC 1.14.99.35) is an enzyme that catalyzes the chemical reaction

thiophene-2-carbonyl-CoA + AH_{2} + O_{2} $\rightleftharpoons$ 5-hydroxythiophene-2-carbonyl-CoA + A + H_{2}O

The three substrates of this enzyme are thiophene-2-carbonyl-CoA, an electron acceptor AH_{2}, and O_{2}. Its three products are 5-hydroxythiophene-2-carbonyl-CoA, the reduction product A, and H_{2}O.

This enzyme belongs to the family of oxidoreductases, specifically those acting on paired donors, with O_{2} as oxidant and incorporation or reduction of oxygen. The oxygen incorporated need not be derived from O miscellaneous. The systematic name of this enzyme class is thiophene-2-carbonyl-CoA, hydrogen-donor:oxygen oxidoreductase. Other names in common use include thiophene-2-carboxyl-CoA dehydrogenase, thiophene-2-carboxyl-CoA hydroxylase, and thiophene-2-carboxyl-CoA monooxygenase.
