= D-2-hydroxy-acid dehydrogenase =

Identifiers
- EC no.: 1.1.99.6
- CAS no.: 9028-83-5

Databases
- BRENDA: enzyme data
- ExPASy: NiceZyme view
- KEGG: enzyme entry
- MetaCyc: metabolic pathway
- Rhea: reactions
- PDB structures: RCSB PDB PDBe PDBsum
- Gene Ontology: AmiGO / QuickGO
Search
- PMC: articles
- PubMed: articles
- NCBI: proteins

In enzymology, D-2-hydroxy-acid dehydrogenase (EC 1.1.99.6) is an enzyme that catalyzes the chemical reaction

(R)-lactic acid
+ electron acceptor
pyruvic acid
+ reduced acceptor

The two substrates of this enzyme are (R)-lactic acid and an electron acceptor. Its products are pyruvic acid and the corresponding reduced acceptor.

This enzyme belongs to the family of oxidoreductases, specifically those acting on the CH-OH group of donor with other acceptors. The systematic name of this enzyme class is (R)-2-hydroxy-acid:acceptor 2-oxidoreductase. Other names in common use include D-2-hydroxy acid dehydrogenase, and (R)-2-hydroxy-acid:(acceptor) 2-oxidoreductase. It has 2 cofactors: FAD, and zinc.
