= Quinoline-4-carboxylate 2-oxidoreductase =

quinoline-4-carboxylate 2-oxidoreductase

Identifiers
- EC no.: 1.3.99.19
- CAS no.: 175780-18-4

Databases
- IntEnz: IntEnz view
- BRENDA: BRENDA entry
- ExPASy: NiceZyme view
- KEGG: KEGG entry
- MetaCyc: metabolic pathway
- PRIAM: profile
- PDB structures: RCSB PDB PDBe PDBsum
- Gene Ontology: AmiGO / QuickGO
Search
- PMC: articles
- PubMed: articles
- NCBI: proteins

In enzymology, quinoline-4-carboxylate 2-oxidoreductase (EC 1.3.99.19) is an enzyme that catalyzes the chemical reaction

quinoline-4-carboxylic acid
+ electron acceptor
H_{2}O
H_{2}O
2-hydroxycinchoninic acid
+ reduced acceptor

The three substrates of this enzyme are quinoline-4-carboxylic acid, an electron acceptor, and water. Its products are 2-hydroxycinchoninic acid and reduced acceptor.

This enzyme belongs to the family of oxidoreductases, specifically those acting on the CH-CH group of donor with other acceptors. The systematic name of this enzyme class is quinoline-4-carboxylate:acceptor 2-oxidoreductase (hydroxylating). Other names in common use include quinaldic acid 4-oxidoreductase, and quinoline-4-carboxylate:acceptor 2-oxidoreductase (hydroxylating).
