= Estradiol 6beta-monooxygenase =

Estradiol 6-beta-monooxygenase

Identifiers
- EC no.: 1.14.99.11
- CAS no.: 9029-70-3

Databases
- IntEnz: IntEnz view
- BRENDA: BRENDA entry
- ExPASy: NiceZyme view
- KEGG: KEGG entry
- MetaCyc: metabolic pathway
- PRIAM: profile
- PDB structures: RCSB PDB PDBe PDBsum
- Gene Ontology: AmiGO / QuickGO
Search
- PMC: articles
- PubMed: articles
- NCBI: proteins

Estradiol 6beta-monooxygenase (EC 1.14.99.11) is an enzyme that catalyzes the chemical reaction:

estradiol
+ reduced
acceptor
O_{2}
H_{2}O
6β-hydroxy-17β-estradiol
+ electron
acceptor

Estradiol 6β-monooxygenase is an oxidoreductase, that uses molecular oxygen to introduce a hydroxy group at a specific position in the female sex hormone, estradiol. The systematic name of this enzyme class is estradiol-17beta,hydrogen-donor:oxygen oxidoreductase (6beta-hydroxylating). This enzyme is also called estradiol 6beta-hydroxylase.
