= Glucoside 3-dehydrogenase =

Identifiers
- EC no.: 1.1.99.13
- CAS no.: 9031-74-7

Databases
- BRENDA: enzyme data
- ExPASy: NiceZyme view
- KEGG: enzyme entry
- MetaCyc: metabolic pathway
- Rhea: reactions
- PDB structures: RCSB PDB PDBe PDBsum
Search
- PMC: articles
- PubMed: articles
- NCBI: proteins

In enzymology, glucoside 3-dehydrogenase (EC 1.1.99.13) is an enzyme that catalyzes the chemical reaction

sucrose
+ electron
acceptor
3-ketosucrose
+ reduced
acceptor

The two substrates of this enzyme are sucrose and an electron acceptor. Its products are 3-ketosucrose and the corresponding reduced acceptor.

This enzyme participates in galactose metabolism and starch and sucrose metabolism. It employs one cofactor, FAD.

== Nomenclature ==
This enzyme belongs to the family of oxidoreductases, specifically those acting on the CH-OH group of donor with other acceptors. The systematic name of this enzyme class is D-aldohexoside:acceptor 3-oxidoreductase. Other names in common use include D-glucoside 3-dehydrogenase, D-aldohexopyranoside dehydrogenase, D-aldohexoside:cytochrome c oxidoreductase, D-glucoside 3-dehydrogenase, hexopyranoside-cytochrome c oxidoreductase, and D-aldohexoside:(acceptor) 3-oxidoreductase.
