= 2-furoyl-CoA dehydrogenase =

Class of enzymes

Identifiers
- EC no.: 1.3.99.8
- CAS no.: 9068-18-2

Databases
- BRENDA: enzyme data
- ExPASy: NiceZyme view
- KEGG: enzyme entry
- MetaCyc: metabolic pathway
- Rhea: reactions
- PDB structures: RCSB PDB PDBe PDBsum
- Gene Ontology: AmiGO / QuickGO
Search
- PMC: articles
- PubMed: articles
- NCBI: proteins

In enzymology, a 2-furoyl-CoA dehydrogenase (EC 1.3.99.8) is an enzyme that catalyzes the chemical reaction

2-furoyl-CoA + H_{2}O + acceptor $\rightleftharpoons$ S-(5-hydroxy-2-furoyl)-CoA + reduced acceptor

The 3 substrates of this enzyme are 2-furoyl-CoA, H_{2}O, and acceptor, whereas its two products are S-(5-hydroxy-2-furoyl)-CoA and reduced acceptor.

This enzyme belongs to the family of oxidoreductases, specifically those acting on the CH-CH group of donor with other acceptors. The systematic name of this enzyme class is 2-furoyl-CoA:acceptor 5-oxidoreductase (hydroxylating). Commonly used names include furoyl-CoA hydroxylase, 2-furoyl coenzyme A hydroxylase, 2-furoyl coenzyme A dehydrogenase, and 2-furoyl-CoA:(acceptor) 5-oxidoreductase (hydroxylating). It employs one cofactor, copper.
