= D-sorbitol dehydrogenase (acceptor) =

Identifiers
- EC no.: 1.1.99.21
- CAS no.: 9028-22-2

Databases
- BRENDA: enzyme data
- ExPASy: NiceZyme view
- KEGG: enzyme entry
- MetaCyc: metabolic pathway
- Rhea: reactions
- PDB structures: RCSB PDB PDBe PDBsum
- Gene Ontology: AmiGO / QuickGO
Search
- PMC: articles
- PubMed: articles
- NCBI: proteins

In enzymology, D-sorbitol dehydrogenase (acceptor) (EC 1.1.99.21) is an enzyme that catalyzes the chemical reaction

D-sorbitol
+ electron
acceptor
L-sorbose
+ reduced
acceptor

The two substrates of this enzyme are D-sorbitol and an electron acceptor. Its products are L-sorbose (shown in open-chain keto form) and the corresponding reduced acceptor.

This enzyme belongs to the family of oxidoreductases, specifically those acting on the CH-OH group of donor with other acceptors. The systematic name of this enzyme class is D-sorbitol:acceptor 1-oxidoreductase. This enzyme is also called D-sorbitol:(acceptor) 1-oxidoreductase. This enzyme participates in fructose and mannose metabolism. It employs one cofactor, FAD.
