= (R)-pantolactone dehydrogenase (flavin) =

Class of enzymes

Identifiers
- EC no.: 1.1.99.27
- CAS no.: 140879-14-7

Databases
- IntEnz: IntEnz view
- BRENDA: BRENDA entry
- ExPASy: NiceZyme view
- KEGG: KEGG entry
- MetaCyc: metabolic pathway
- PRIAM: profile
- PDB structures: RCSB PDB PDBe PDBsum
- Gene Ontology: AmiGO / QuickGO
Search
- PMC: articles
- PubMed: articles
- NCBI: proteins

In enzymology, (R)-pantolactone dehydrogenase (flavin) (EC 1.1.99.27) is an enzyme that catalyzes the chemical reaction

(R)-pantolactone
+ electron
acceptor
2-dehydropantolactone
+ reduced
acceptor

The two substrates of this enzyme are (R)-pantolactone and an electron acceptor. Its products are 2-dehydropantolactone and the corresponding reduced acceptor.

This enzyme belongs to the family of oxidoreductases, specifically those acting on the CH-OH group of donor with other acceptors. The systematic name of this enzyme class is (R)-pantolactone:acceptor oxidoreductase (flavin-containing). Other names in common use include 2-dehydropantolactone reductase (flavin), 2-dehydropantoyl-lactone reductase (flavin), and (R)-pantoyllactone dehydrogenase (flavin).
