= Hydroxylamine reductase =

hydroxylamine reductase

Identifiers
- EC no.: 1.7.99.1
- CAS no.: 37256-42-1

Databases
- BRENDA: enzyme data
- ExPASy: NiceZyme view
- KEGG: enzyme entry
- MetaCyc: metabolic pathway
- Rhea: reactions
- PDB structures: RCSB PDB PDBe PDBsum
- Gene Ontology: AmiGO / QuickGO
Search
- PMC: articles
- PubMed: articles
- NCBI: proteins

In enzymology, a hydroxylamine reductase (EC 1.7.99.1) is an enzyme that catalyzes the chemical reaction

NH_{3} + H_{2}O + acceptor $\rightleftharpoons$ hydroxylamine + reduced acceptor

The 3 substrates of this enzyme are NH_{3}, H_{2}O, and acceptor, whereas its two products are hydroxylamine and reduced acceptor.

This enzyme belongs to the family of oxidoreductases, specifically those acting on other nitrogenous compounds as donors with other acceptors. The systematic name of this enzyme class is ammonia:acceptor oxidoreductase. Other names in common use include hydroxylamine (acceptor) reductase, and ammonia:(acceptor) oxidoreductase. This enzyme participates in nitrogen metabolism. It has 2 cofactors: FAD, and Flavoprotein.
