= 2-oxo-acid reductase =

Class of enzymes

Identifiers
- EC no.: 1.1.99.30
- CAS no.: 115299-99-5

Databases
- IntEnz: IntEnz view
- BRENDA: BRENDA entry
- ExPASy: NiceZyme view
- KEGG: KEGG entry
- MetaCyc: metabolic pathway
- PRIAM: profile
- PDB structures: RCSB PDB PDBe PDBsum
Search
- PMC: articles
- PubMed: articles
- NCBI: proteins

In enzymology, a 2-oxo-acid reductase (EC 1.1.99.30) is an enzyme that catalyzes the chemical reaction

a (2R)-hydroxy-carboxylate + acceptor $\rightleftharpoons$ a 2-oxo-carboxylate + reduced acceptor

Thus, the two substrates of this enzyme are (2R)-hydroxy-carboxylate and acceptor, whereas its two products are 2-oxo-carboxylate and reduced acceptor.

This enzyme belongs to the family of oxidoreductases, specifically those acting on the CH-OH group of donor with other acceptors. The systematic name of this enzyme class is (2R)-hydroxy-carboxylate:acceptor oxidoreductase. Other names in common use include (2R)-hydroxycarboxylate-viologen-oxidoreductase, HVOR, and 2-oxoacid reductase.
