= Sorbose dehydrogenase =

Sorbose Dehydrogenase

Identifiers
- EC no.: 1.1.99.12
- CAS no.: 37250-86-5

Databases
- IntEnz: IntEnz view
- BRENDA: BRENDA entry
- ExPASy: NiceZyme view
- KEGG: KEGG entry
- MetaCyc: metabolic pathway
- PRIAM: profile
- PDB structures: RCSB PDB PDBe PDBsum
- Gene Ontology: AmiGO / QuickGO
Search
- PMC: articles
- PubMed: articles
- NCBI: proteins

In enzymology, sorbose dehydrogenase (EC 1.1.99.12) is an enzyme that catalyzes the chemical reaction

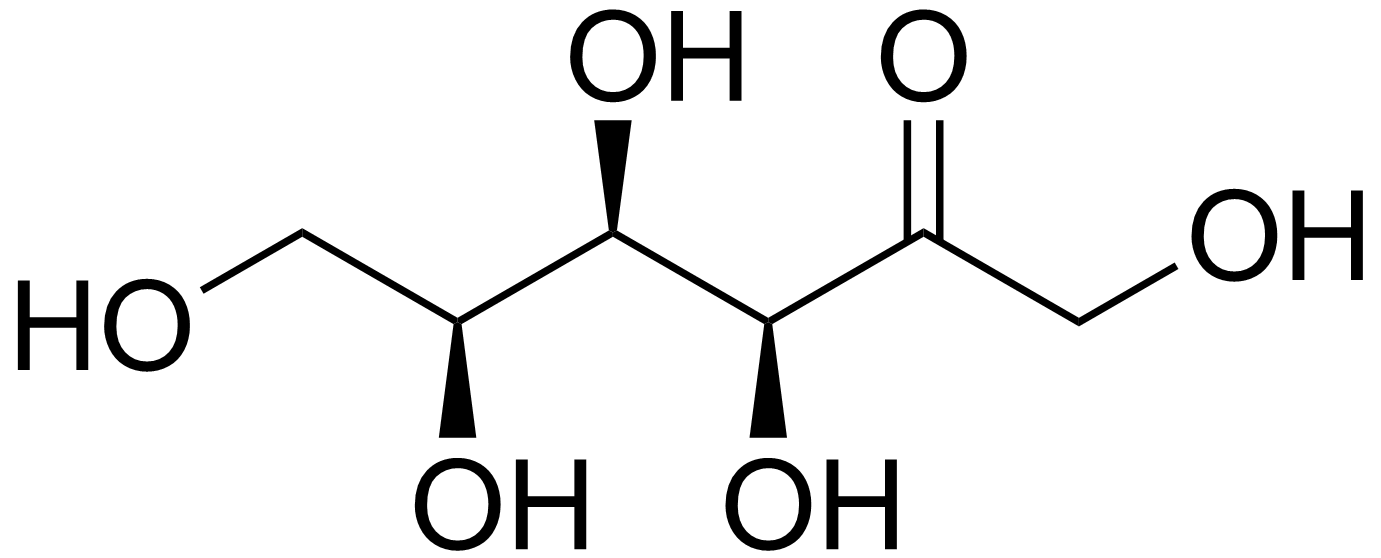
L-sorbose
+ electron acceptor
5-dehydro-D-fructose
+ reduced acceptor

The two substrates of this enzyme are L-sorbose and an electron acceptor. Its products are 5-dehydro-D-fructose and the corresponsing reduced acceptor.

This enzyme belongs to the family of oxidoreductases, specifically those acting on the CH-OH group of donor with other acceptors. The systematic name of this enzyme class is L-sorbose:acceptor 5-oxidoreductase. This enzyme is also called L-sorbose:(acceptor) 5-oxidoreductase.
