= Tetracyanoethylene =

Organic compound with formula C2(CN)4

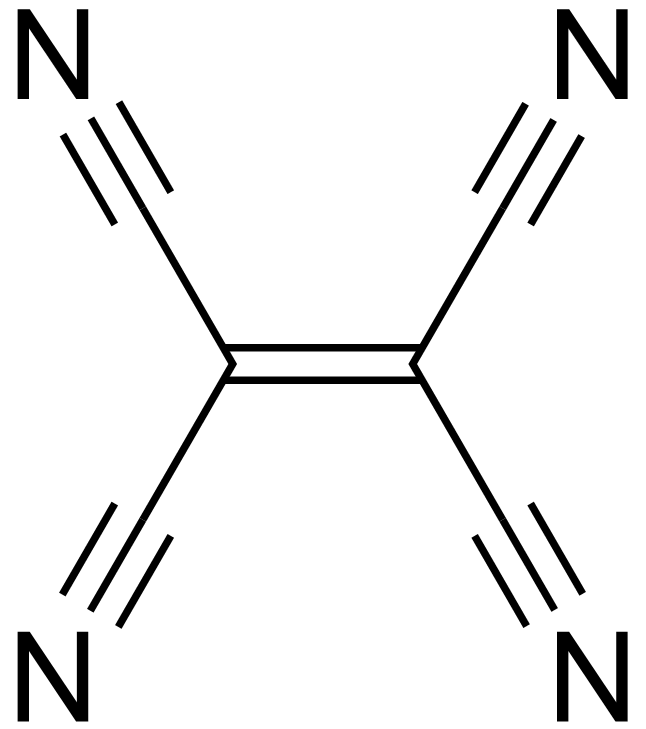

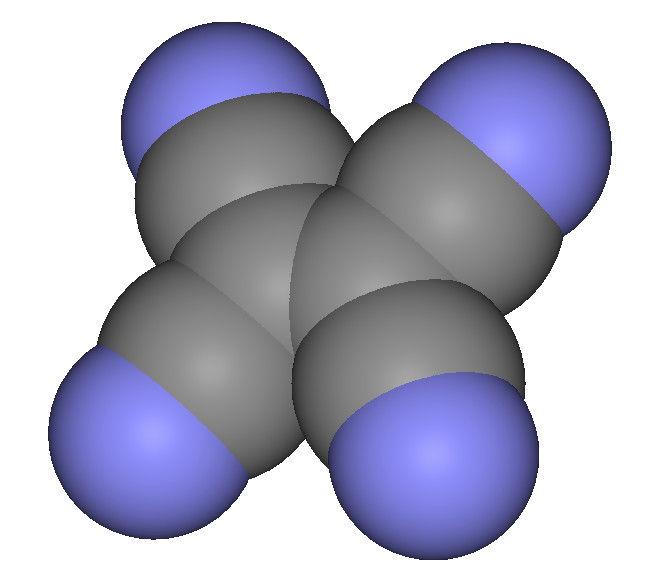
tetracyanoethylene
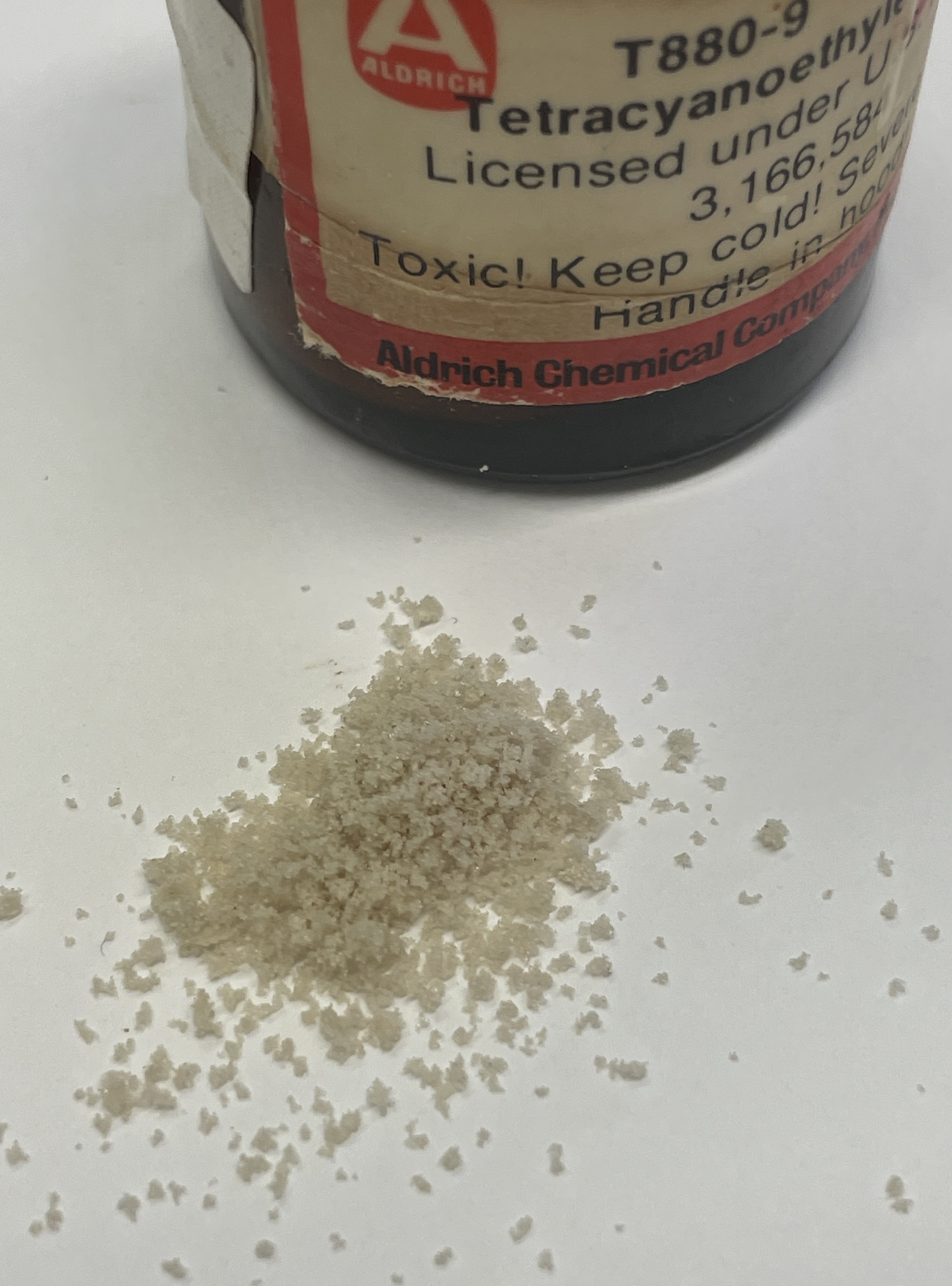

Names
- Preferred IUPAC name Ethenetetracarbonitrile
- Other names TCNE

Identifiers
CAS Number	670-54-2
3D model (JSmol)	Interactive image
ChemSpider	12114
ECHA InfoCard	100.010.527
PubChem CID	12635
UNII	C592309ECU
CompTox Dashboard (EPA)	DTXSID7049425
- InChI: InChI=1S/C6N4/c7-1-5(2-8)6(3-9)4-10 Key: NLDYACGHTUPAQU-UHFFFAOYSA-N; InChI=1/C6N4/c7-1-5(2-8)6(3-9)4-10 Key: NLDYACGHTUPAQU-UHFFFAOYAN
- SMILES: N#CC(C#N)=C(C#N)C#N

Properties
Chemical formula	C_{2}(CN)_{4}
Molar mass	128.094 g·mol^{−1}
Density	1.35 g/cm^{3}
Melting point	199 °C (390 °F; 472 K)
Boiling point	130 to 140 °C (266 to 284 °F; 403 to 413 K) 0.1 mmHg (sublimes)
- Except where otherwise noted, data are given for materials in their standard state (at 25 °C [77 °F], 100 kPa). verify (what is ?) Infobox references

Tetracyanoethylene (TCNE) is organic compound with the formula C_{2}(CN)_{4}. It is a colorless solid, although samples are often off-white. It is an important member of the cyanocarbons.

== Synthesis and reactions ==
TCNE is prepared by brominating malononitrile in the presence of potassium bromide to give the KBr-complex, and dehalogenating with copper.

Oxidation of TCNE with hydrogen peroxide gives the corresponding epoxide, which has unusual properties.

In the presence of base, TCNE reacts with malononitrile to give salts of pentacyanopropenide:

C_{2}(CN)_{4} + CH_{2}(CN)_{2} → [(NC)_{2}C=C(CN)−C(CN)_{2}]^{−} + CN^{−} + 2 H^{+}

== Redox chemistry ==
TCNE is an electron acceptor. Cyano groups have low energy π* orbitals, and the presence of four such groups, with their π systems (conjugated) to the central C=C double bond, gives rise to an electrophilic alkene. TCNE is reduced at −0.27 V vs ferrocene/ferrocenium:

C_{2}(CN)_{4} + e^{−} → [C_{2}(CN)_{4}]^{−}

Because of its ability to accept an electron, TCNE has been used to prepare numerous charge-transfer salts and magnetic molecular materials.

The central C=C distance in TCNE is 135 pm. Upon reduction, this bond elongates to 141–145 pm, depending on the counterion.

== Safety ==
TCNE hydrolyzes in moist air to give hydrogen cyanide and should be handled accordingly.
