= Sorbose reductase =

sorbose reductase

Identifiers
- EC no.: 1.1.1.289

Databases
- IntEnz: IntEnz view
- BRENDA: BRENDA entry
- ExPASy: NiceZyme view
- KEGG: KEGG entry
- MetaCyc: metabolic pathway
- PRIAM: profile
- PDB structures: RCSB PDB PDBe PDBsum
- Gene Ontology: AmiGO / QuickGO
Search
- PMC: articles
- PubMed: articles
- NCBI: proteins

In enzymology, sorbose reductase (EC 1.1.1.289) is an enzyme that catalyzes the chemical reaction

D-sorbitol
+ NADP^{+}
H^{+}
H^{+}
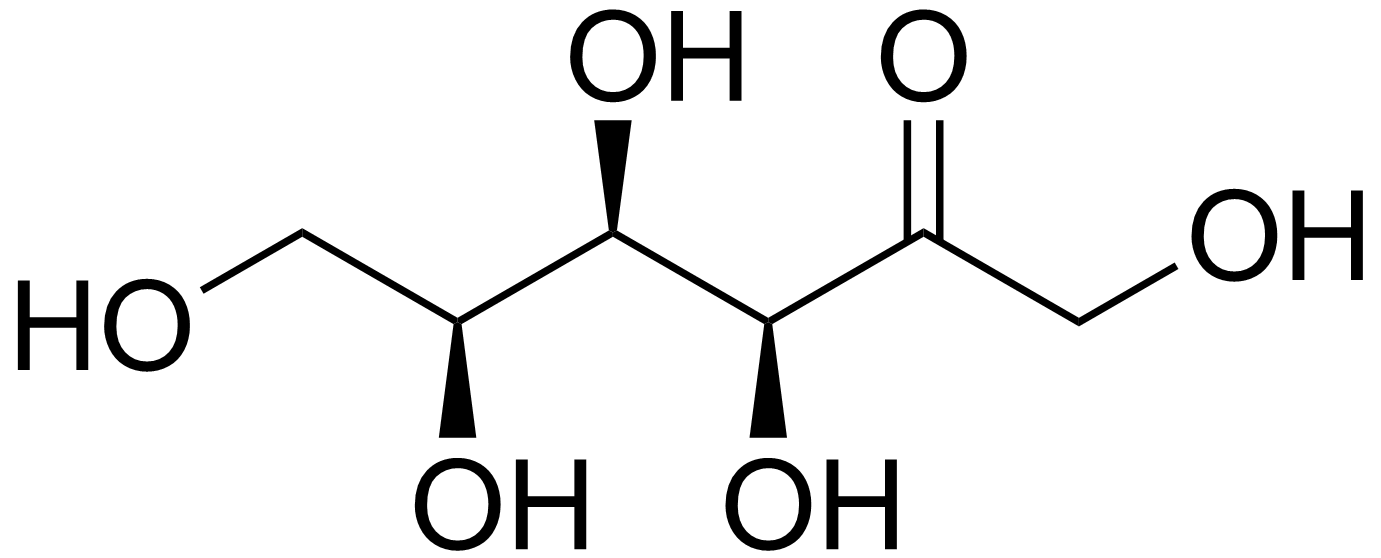
L-sorbose
+ NADPH

The two substrates of this enzyme are D-sorbitol and oxidised nicotinamide adenine dinucleotide phosphate (NADP^{+}). Its products are L-sorbose (shown in open-chain keto form), reduced NADPH, and a proton.

This enzyme belongs to the family of oxidoreductases, specifically those acting on the CH-OH group of donor with NAD^{+} or NADP^{+} as acceptor. The systematic name of this enzyme class is D-glucitol:NADP^{+} oxidoreductase. This enzyme is also called Sou1p.
