= Carbanion =

Organic ion with a negatively charged carbon atom

In organic chemistry, a carbanion is an anion with a lone pair attached to a trivalent carbon atom. This gives the carbon atom a negative charge.

Formally, a carbanion is the conjugate base of a carbon acid:

R_{3}CH + B^{−} → R_{3}C^{−} + HB

where B stands for the base. The carbanions formed from deprotonation of alkanes (at an sp^{3} carbon), alkenes (at an sp^{2} carbon), arenes (at an sp^{2} carbon), and alkynes (at an sp carbon) are known as alkyl, alkenyl (vinyl), aryl, and alkynyl (acetylide) anions, respectively.

Carbanions have a concentration of electron density at the negatively charged carbon, which, in most cases, reacts efficiently with a variety of electrophiles of varying strengths, including carbonyl groups, imines/iminium salts, halogenating reagents (e.g., N-bromosuccinimide and diiodine), and proton donors. A carbanion is one of several reactive intermediates in organic chemistry. In organic synthesis, organolithium reagents and Grignard reagents are commonly treated and referred to as "carbanions." This is a convenient approximation, although these species are generally clusters or complexes containing highly polar, but still covalent metal–carbon bonds (M^{δ+}–C^{δ−}) rather than true carbanions.

== Geometry ==
Absent π delocalization, the negative charge of a carbanion is localized in an sp^{x} hybridized orbital on carbon as a lone pair. As a consequence, localized alkyl, alkenyl/aryl, and alkynyl carbanions assume trigonal pyramidal, bent, and linear geometries, respectively. By Bent's rule, placement of the carbanionic lone pair electrons in an orbital with significant s character is favorable, accounting for the pyramidalized and bent geometries of alkyl and alkenyl carbanions, respectively. Valence shell electron pair repulsion (VSEPR) theory makes similar predictions. This contrasts with carbocations, which have a preference for unoccupied nonbonding orbitals of pure atomic p character, leading to planar and linear geometries, respectively, for alkyl and alkenyl carbocations.

An alkyl carbanion is trigonal pyramidal.

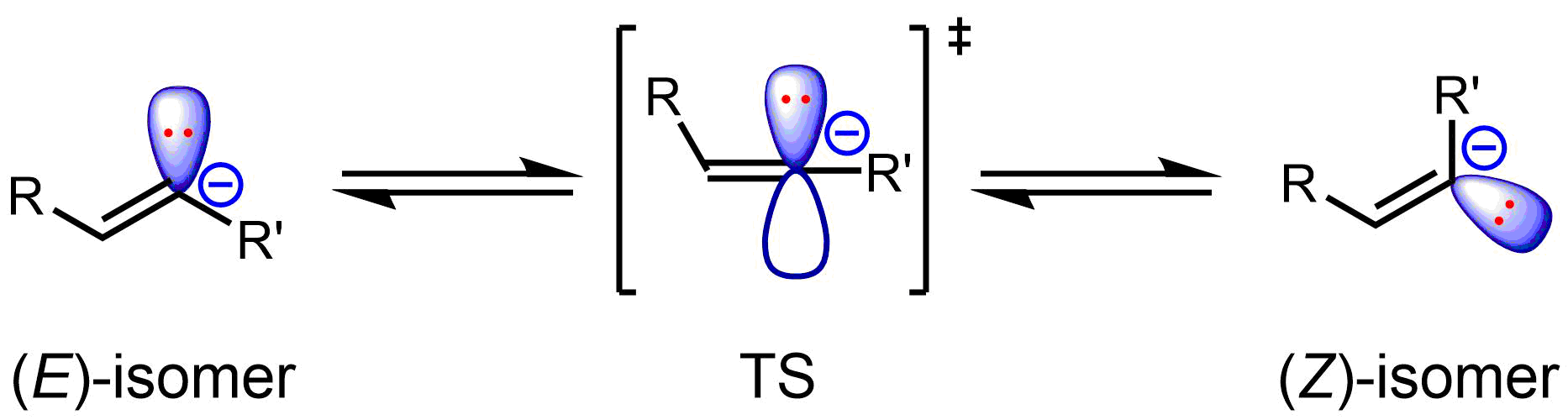
Vinyl anions are bent. 1,2-Disubstituted vinyl anions have E and Z isomers that undergo inversion through a linear transition state.

However, delocalized carbanions may deviate from these geometries. Instead of residing in a hybrid orbital, the carbanionic lone pair may instead occupy a p orbital (or an orbital of high p character). A p orbital has a more suitable shape and orientation to overlap with the neighboring π system, resulting in more effective charge delocalization. As a consequence, alkyl carbanions with neighboring conjugating groups (e.g., allylic anions, enolates, nitronates, etc.) are generally planar rather than pyramidized. Likewise, delocalized alkenyl carbanions sometimes favor a linear instead of bent geometry. More often, a bent geometry is still preferred for substituted alkenyl anions, though the linear geometry is only slightly less stable, resulting in facile equilibration between the (E) and (Z) isomers of the (bent) anion through a linear transition state. For instance, calculations indicate that the parent vinyl anion or ethylenide, H_{2}C=CH^{−}, has an inversion barrier of 27 kcal/mol (110 kJ/mol), while allenyl anion or allenide, H_{2}C=C=CH^{−} ↔ H_{2}C^{−}−C≡CH), whose negative charge is stabilized by delocalization, has an inversion barrier of only 4 kcal/mol (17 kJ/mol), reflecting stabilization of the linear transition state by better π delocalization.

== Trends and occurrence ==
Carbanions are typically nucleophilic and basic. The basicity and nucleophilicity of carbanions are determined by the substituents on carbon. These include

- the inductive effect. Electronegative atoms adjacent to the charge will stabilize the charge;
- the extent of conjugation of the anion. Resonance effects can stabilize the anion. This is especially true when the anion is stabilized as a result of aromaticity.

Geometry also affects the orbital hybridization of the charge-bearing carbanion. The greater the s-character of the charge-bearing atom, the more stable the anion.

Carbanions, especially ones derived from weak carbon acids that do not benefit sufficiently from the two stabilizing factors listed above, are generally oxygen- and water-sensitive to varying degrees. While some merely degrade and decompose over several weeks or months upon exposure to air, others may react vigorously and exothermically with air almost immediately to spontaneously ignite (pyrophoricity). Among commonly encountered carbanionic reagents in the laboratory, ionic salts of hydrogen cyanide (cyanides) are unusual in being indefinitely stable under dry air and hydrolyzing only very slowly in the presence of moisture.

Organometallic reagents like butyllithium (hexameric cluster, [BuLi]_{6}) or methylmagnesium bromide (ether complex, MeMg(Br)(OEt_{2})_{2}) are often referred to as "carbanions," at least in a retrosynthetic sense. However, they are really clusters or complexes containing a polar covalent bond, though with electron density heavily polarized toward the carbon atom. The more electropositive the attached metal atom, the closer the behavior of the reagent is to that of a true carbanion.

In fact, true carbanions (i.e., a species not attached to a stabilizing covalently bound metal) without electron-withdrawing and/or conjugating substituents are not available in the condensed phase, and these species must be studied in the gas phase. For some time, it was not known whether simple alkyl anions could exist as free species; many theoretical studies predicted that even the methanide anion CH^{−}_{3} should be an unbound species (i.e., the electron affinity of •CH_{3} was predicted to be negative). Such a species would decompose immediately by spontaneous ejection of an electron and would therefore be too fleeting to observe directly by mass spectrometry. However, in 1978, the methanide anion was unambiguously synthesized by subjecting ketene to an electric discharge, and the electron affinity (EA) of •CH_{3} was determined by photoelectron spectroscopy to be +1.8 kcal/mol, making it a bound species, but just barely so. The structure of CH^{−}_{3} was found to be pyramidal (C_{3v}) with an H−C−H angle of 108° and inversion barrier of 1.3 kcal/mol, while •CH_{3} was determined to be planar (D_{3h} point group).

Simple primary, secondary and tertiary sp^{3} carbanions (e.g., ethanide CH_{3}CH^{−}_{2}, isopropanide (CH_{3})_{2}CH^{−}, and t-butanide (CH_{3})_{3}C^{−}) were subsequently determined to be unbound species (the EAs of CH_{3}CH_{2}•, (CH_{3})_{2}CH•, (CH_{3})_{3}C• are −6, −7.4, −3.6 kcal/mol, respectively) indicating that α substitution is destabilizing. However, relatively modest stabilizing effects can render them bound. For example, cyclopropyl and cubyl anions are bound due to increased s character of the lone pair orbital, while neopentyl and phenethyl anions are also bound, as a result of negative hyperconjugation of the lone pair with the β-substituent (n_{C} → σ*_{C–C}). The same holds true for anions with benzylic and allylic stabilization. Gas-phase carbanions that are sp^{2} and sp hybridized are much more strongly stabilized and are often prepared directly by gas-phase deprotonation.

In the condensed phase only carbanions that are sufficiently stabilized by delocalization have been isolated as truly ionic species. In 1984, Olmstead and Power presented the lithium crown ether salt of the triphenylmethanide carbanion from triphenylmethane, n-butyllithium and 12-crown-4 (which forms a stable complex with lithium cations) at low temperatures:

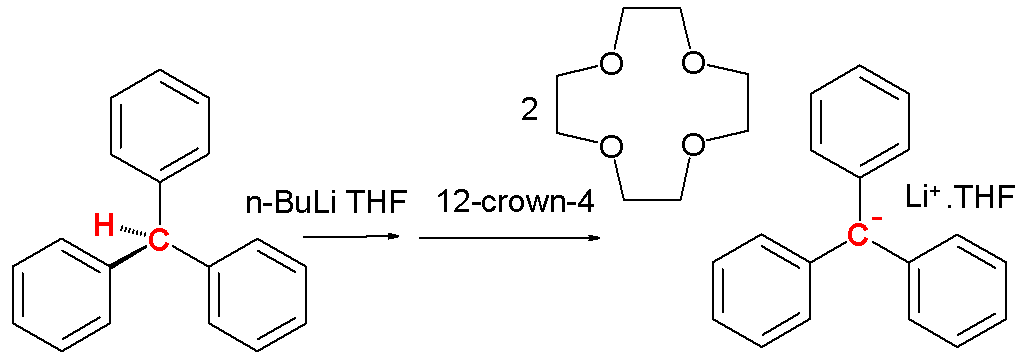
Formation of the triphenylmethane anion

Adding n-butyllithium to triphenylmethane (pK_{a} in DMSO of CHPh_{3} = 30.6) in THF at low temperatures followed by 12-crown-4 results in a red solution and the salt complex [Li(12-crown-4)]^{+}[CPh_{3}]^{−} precipitates at −20 °C. The central C–C bond lengths are 145 pm with the phenyl ring propellered at an average angle of 31.2°. This propeller shape is less pronounced with a tetramethylammonium counterion. A crystal structure for the analogous diphenylmethanide anion ([Li(12-crown-4)]^{+}[CHPh_{2}]^{−}), prepared form diphenylmethane (pK_{a} in DMSO of CH_{2}Ph_{2} = 32.3), was also obtained. However, the attempted isolation of a complex of the benzyl anion PhCH^{−}_{2} from toluene (pK_{a} in DMSO of CH_{3}Ph ≈ 43) was unsuccessful, due to rapid reaction of the formed anion with the THF solvent. The free benzyl anion has also been generated in the solution phase by pulse radiolysis of dibenzylmercury.

Early in 1904 and 1917, Schlenk prepared two red-colored salts, formulated as [NMe_{4}]^{+}[CPh_{3}]^{−} and [NMe_{4}]^{+}[PhCH_{2}]^{−}, respectively, by metathesis of the corresponding organosodium reagent with tetramethylammonium chloride. Since tetramethylammonium cations cannot form a chemical bond to the carbanionic center, these species are believed to contain free carbanions. While the structure of the former was verified by X-ray crystallography almost a century later, the instability of the latter has so far precluded structural verification. The reaction of the putative "[NMe_{4}]^{+}[PhCH_{2}]^{−}" with water was reported to liberate toluene and tetramethylammonium hydroxide and provides indirect evidence for the claimed formulation.

One tool for the detection of carbanions in solution is proton NMR. A spectrum of cyclopentadiene in DMSO shows four vinylic protons at 6.5 ppm and two methylene bridge protons at 3 ppm whereas the cyclopentadienyl anion has a single resonance at 5.50 ppm. The use of ^{6}Li and ^{7}Li NMR has provided structural and reactivity data for a variety of organolithium species.

== Carbon acids ==
Any compound containing hydrogen can, in principle, undergo deprotonation to form its conjugate base. A compound is a carbon acid if deprotonation results in loss of a proton from a carbon atom. Compared to compounds typically considered to be acids (e.g., mineral acids like nitric acid, or carboxylic acids like acetic acid), carbon acids are typically many orders of magnitude weaker, although exceptions exist (see below). For example, benzene is not an acid in the classical Arrhenius sense, since its aqueous solutions are neutral. Nevertheless, it is very weak Brønsted acid with an estimated pK_{a} of 49 which may undergo deprotonation in the presence of a superbase like the Lochmann–Schlosser base (n-butyllithium and potassium t-butoxide). As conjugate acid–base pairs, the factors that determine the relative stability of carbanions also determine the ordering of the pK_{a} values of the corresponding carbon acids. Furthermore, pK_{a} values allow the prediction of whether a proton transfer process will be thermodynamically favorable: In order for the deprotonation of an acidic species HA with base B^{−} to be thermodynamically favorable (K > 1), the relationship pK_{a}(BH) > pK_{a}(AH) must hold.

These values below are pK_{a} values determined in dimethylsulfoxide (DMSO), which has a broader useful range (~0 to ~35) than values determined in water (~0 to ~14) and better reflect the basicity of the carbanions in typical organic solvents. Values below less than 0 or greater than 35 are indirectly estimated; hence, the numerical accuracy of these values is limited. Aqueous pK_{a} values are also commonly encountered in the literature, particularly in the context of biochemistry and enzymology. Moreover, aqueous values are often given in introductory organic chemistry textbooks for pedagogical reasons, although the issue of solvent dependence is often glossed over. In general, pK_{a} values in water and organic solvent diverge significantly when the anion is capable of hydrogen bonding. For instance, in the case of water, the values differ dramatically: the pK_{a} in water of water is 14.0, while the pK_{a} in DMSO of water is 31.4, reflecting the differing ability of water and DMSO to stabilize the hydroxide anion. On the other hand, for cyclopentadiene, the numerical values are comparable: the pK_{a} in water is 15, while the pK_{a} in DMSO is 18.

Carbon acid acidities by pK_{a} in DMSO. These values may differ significantly from aqueous pK_{a} values.
Name	Formula	Structural formula	pK_{a} in DMSO
Cyclohexane	C_{6}H_{12}		~60
Methane	CH_{4}		~56
Benzene	C_{6}H_{6}		~49
Propene	C_{3}H_{6}		~44
Toluene	C_{6}H_{5}CH_{3}		~43
Ammonia (N–H)	NH_{3}		~41
Dithiane	C_{4}H_{8}S_{2}		~39
Dimethyl sulfoxide	(CH_{3})_{2}SO		35.1
Diphenylmethane	C_{13}H_{12}		32.3
Acetonitrile	CH_{3}CN		31.3
Aniline (N–H)	C_{6}H_{5}NH_{2}		30.6
Triphenylmethane	C_{19}H_{16}		30.6
Fluoroform	CHF_{3}		30.5
Xanthene	C_{13}H_{10}O		30.0
Ethanol (O–H)	C_{2}H_{5}OH		29.8
Phenylacetylene	C_{8}H_{6}		28.8
Thioxanthene	C_{13}H_{10}S		28.6
Acetone	C_{3}H_{6}O		26.5
Chloroform	CHCl_{3}		24.4
Benzoxazole	C_{7}H_{5}NO		24.4
Fluorene	C_{13}H_{10}		22.6
Indene	C_{9}H_{8}		20.1
Cyclopentadiene	C_{5}H_{6}		18.0
Nitromethane	CH_{3}NO_{2}		17.2
Diethyl malonate	C_{7}H_{12}O_{4}		16.4
Acetylacetone	(H_{3}CCO)_{2}CH_{2}		13.3
Hydrogen cyanide	HCN		12.9
Acetic acid (O–H)	CH_{3}COOH		12.6
Malononitrile	C_{3}H_{2}N_{2}		11.1
Dimedone	C_{8}H_{12}O_{2}		10.3
Meldrum's acid	C_{6}H_{8}O_{4}		7.3
Hexafluoroacetylacetone	(F_{3}CCO)_{2}CH_{2}		2.3
Hydrogen chloride (Cl–H)	HCl	HCl (g)	−2.0
Triflidic acid	HC(SO_{2}CF_{3})_{3}		~ −16 (Note: The reported pK_{a} in acetonitrile (MeCN) is −3.7. The pK_{a} in DMSO was estimated by the correlation pK_{a}^{MeCN} = 0.98 × pK_{a}^{DMSO} + 11.6.)

Note that acetic acid, ammonia, aniline, ethanol, and hydrogen chloride are not carbon acids, but are common acids shown for comparison.

As indicated by the examples above, acidity increases (pK_{a} decreases) when the negative charge is delocalized. This effect occurs when the substituents on the carbanion are unsaturated and/or electronegative. Although carbon acids are generally thought of as acids that are much weaker than "classical" Brønsted acids like acetic acid or phenol, the cumulative (additive) effect of several electron accepting substituents can lead to acids that are as strong or stronger than the inorganic mineral acids. For example, trinitromethane HC(NO_{2})_{3}, tricyanomethane HC(CN)_{3}, pentacyanocyclopentadiene C_{5}(CN)_{5}H, and fulminic acid HCNO, are all strong acids with aqueous pK_{a} values that indicate complete or nearly complete proton transfer to water. Triflidic acid, with three strongly electron-withdrawing triflyl groups, has an estimated pK_{a} well below −10. On the other end of the scale, hydrocarbons bearing only alkyl groups are thought to have pK_{a} values in the range of 55 to 65. The range of acid dissociation constants for carbon acids thus spans over 70 orders of magnitude.

The acidity of the α-hydrogen in carbonyl compounds enables these compounds to participate in synthetically important C–C bond-forming reactions including the aldol reaction and Michael addition.

== Chiral carbanions ==
With the molecular geometry for a carbanion described as a trigonal pyramid the question is whether or not carbanions can display chirality, because if the activation barrier for inversion of this geometry is too low any attempt at introducing chirality will end in racemization, similar to the nitrogen inversion. However, solid evidence exists that carbanions can indeed be chiral for example in research carried out with certain organolithium compounds.

The first ever evidence for the existence of chiral organolithium compounds was obtained in 1950. Reaction of chiral 2-iodooctane with s-butyllithium in petroleum ether at −70 °C followed by reaction with dry ice yielded mostly racemic 2-methylbutyric acid but also an amount of optically active 2-methyloctanoic acid, which could only have formed from likewise optically active 2-methylheptyllithium with the carbon atom linked to lithium the carbanion:

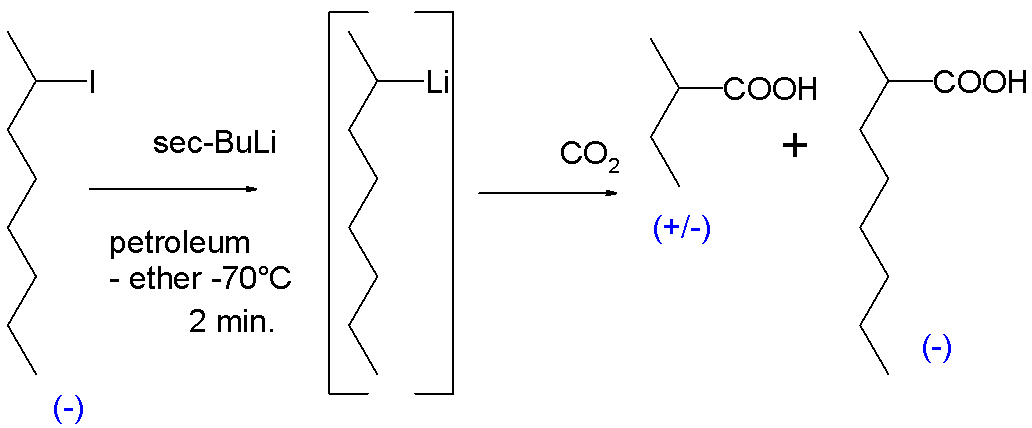
Optically active organolithium

On heating the reaction to 0 °C the optical activity is lost. More evidence followed in the 1960s. A reaction of the cis isomer of 2-methylcyclopropyl bromide with s-butyllithium again followed by carboxylation with dry ice yielded cis-2-methylcyclopropylcarboxylic acid. The formation of the trans isomer would have indicated that the intermediate carbanion was unstable.

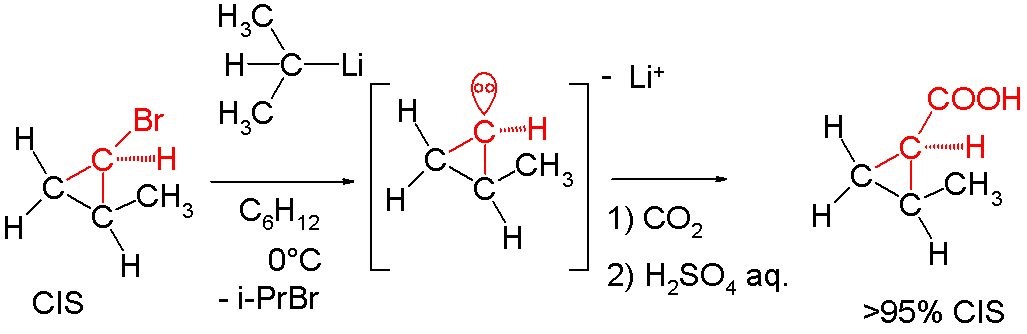
Stereochemistry of organolithiums

In the same manner the reaction of (+)-(S)-l-bromo-l-methyl-2,2-diphenylcyclopropane with n-butyllithium followed by quenching with methanol resulted in product with retention of configuration:

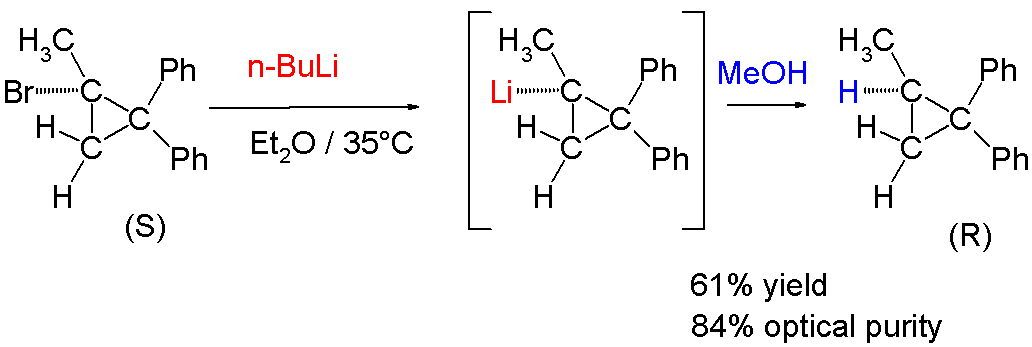
Optical stability of 1-methyl-2,2-diphenylcyclopropyllithium

Of recent date are chiral methyllithium compounds:

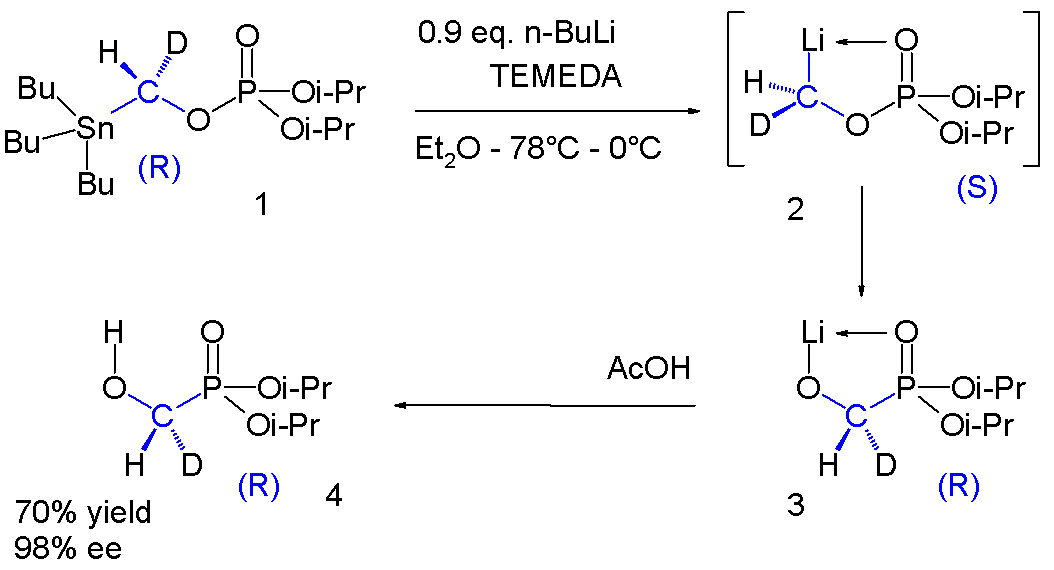
Chiral oxy[^{2}H_{1}]methyllithiums. Bu stands for butyl, i-Pr stands for isopropyl.

The phosphate 1 contains a chiral group with a hydrogen and a deuterium substituent. The stannyl group is replaced by lithium to intermediate 2 which undergoes a phosphate–phosphorane rearrangement to phosphorane 3 which on reaction with acetic acid gives alcohol 4. Once again in the range of −78 °C to 0 °C the chirality is preserved in this reaction sequence. (Enantioselectivity was determined by NMR spectroscopy after derivatization with Mosher's acid.)

== History ==
A carbanionic structure first made an appearance in the reaction mechanism for the benzoin condensation as correctly proposed by Clarke and Arthur Lapworth in 1907. In 1904 Wilhelm Schlenk prepared [Ph_{3}C]^{−}[NMe_{4}]^{+} in a quest for tetramethylammonium (from tetramethylammonium chloride and Ph_{3}CNa) and in 1914 he demonstrated how triarylmethyl radicals could be reduced to carbanions by alkali metals. The term carbanion was introduced by Wallis and Adams in 1933 as the negatively charged counterpart of the carbonium ion.

== See also ==
- Carbocation
- Enolates
- Nitrile anion
