= L-sorbose oxidase =

Class of enzymes

Identifiers
- EC no.: 1.1.3.11
- CAS no.: 37250-81-0

Databases
- IntEnz: IntEnz view
- BRENDA: BRENDA entry
- ExPASy: NiceZyme view
- KEGG: KEGG entry
- MetaCyc: metabolic pathway
- PRIAM: profile
- PDB structures: RCSB PDB PDBe PDBsum
- Gene Ontology: AmiGO / QuickGO
Search
- PMC: articles
- PubMed: articles
- NCBI: proteins

In enzymology, L-sorbose oxidase (EC 1.1.3.11) is an enzyme that catalyzes the chemical reaction

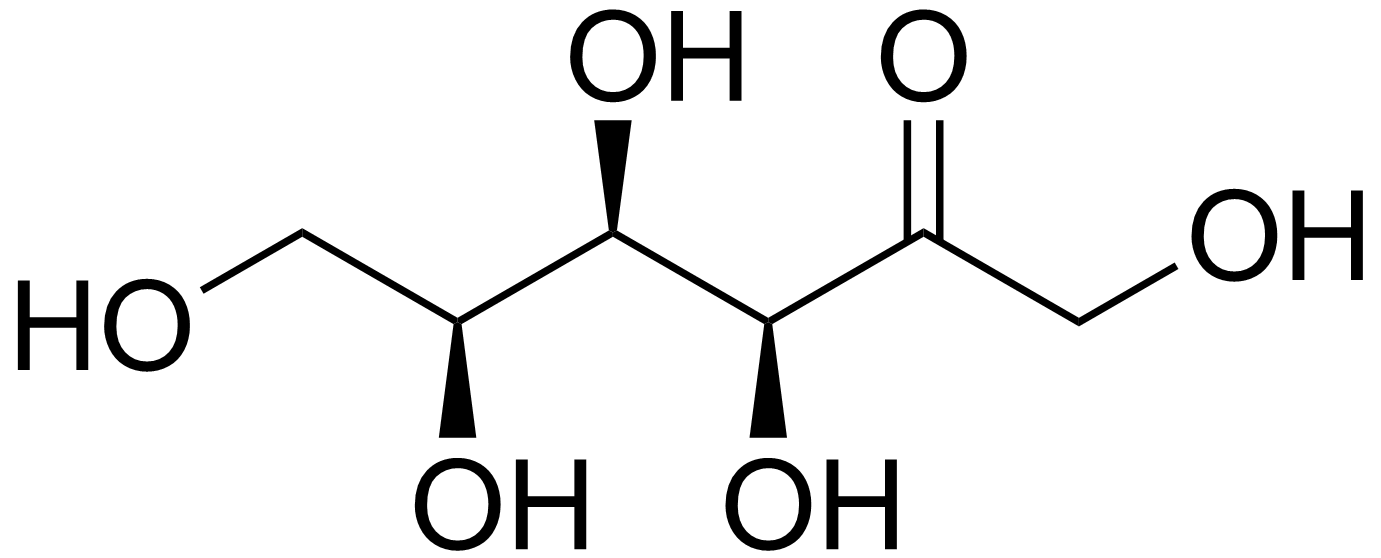
L-sorbose
O_{2}
H_{2}O_{2}
O_{2}
H_{2}O_{2}
5-dehydro-D-fructose

The two substrates of this enzyme are L-sorbose and oxygen. Its products are 5-dehydro-D-fructose and hydrogen peroxide.

This enzyme belongs to the family of oxidoreductases, specifically those acting on the CH-OH group of donor with oxygen as acceptor. The systematic name of this enzyme class is L-sorbose:oxygen 5-oxidoreductase.
