= Cyanoform =

Cyanocarbon compound derived from methane

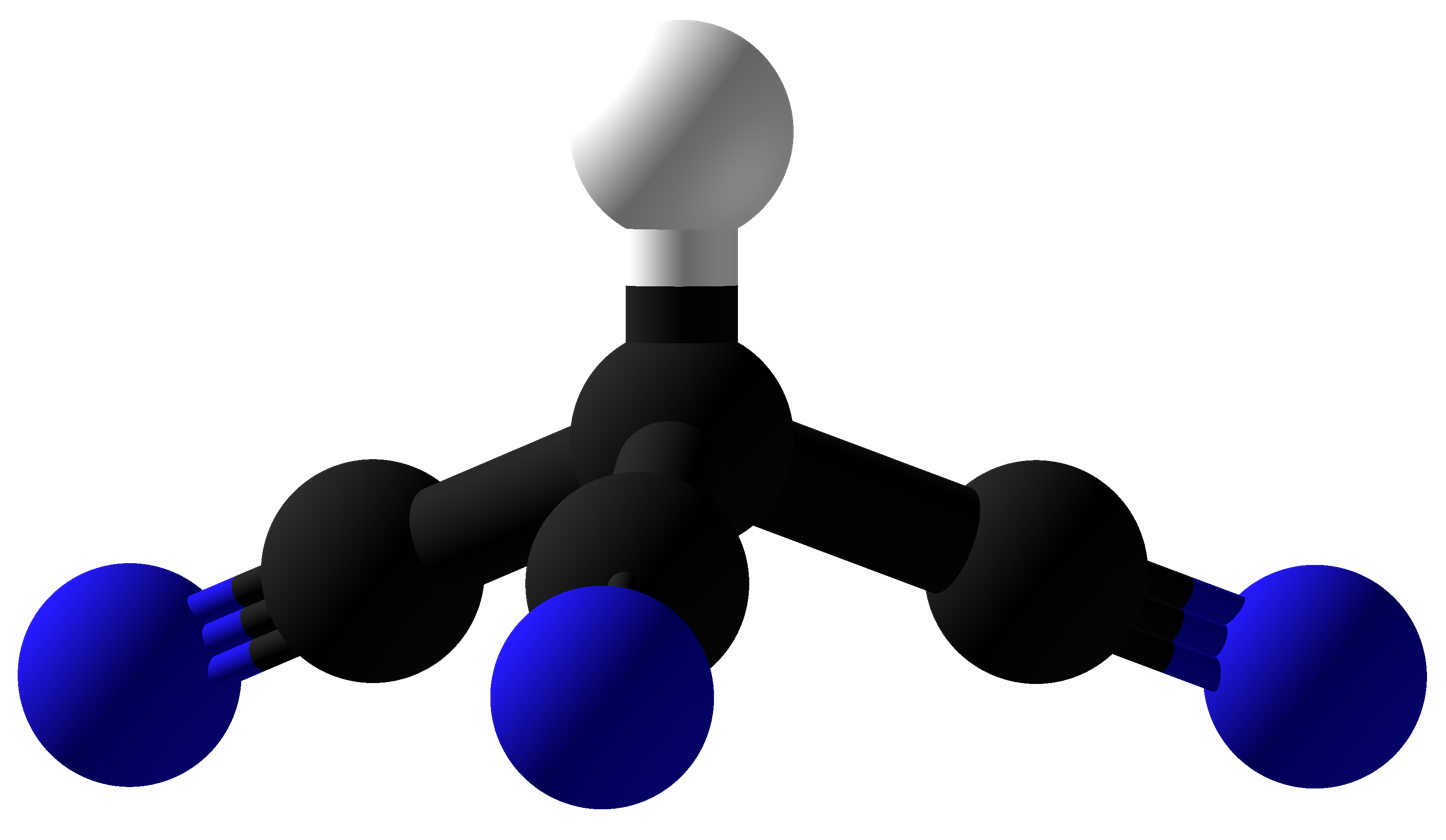

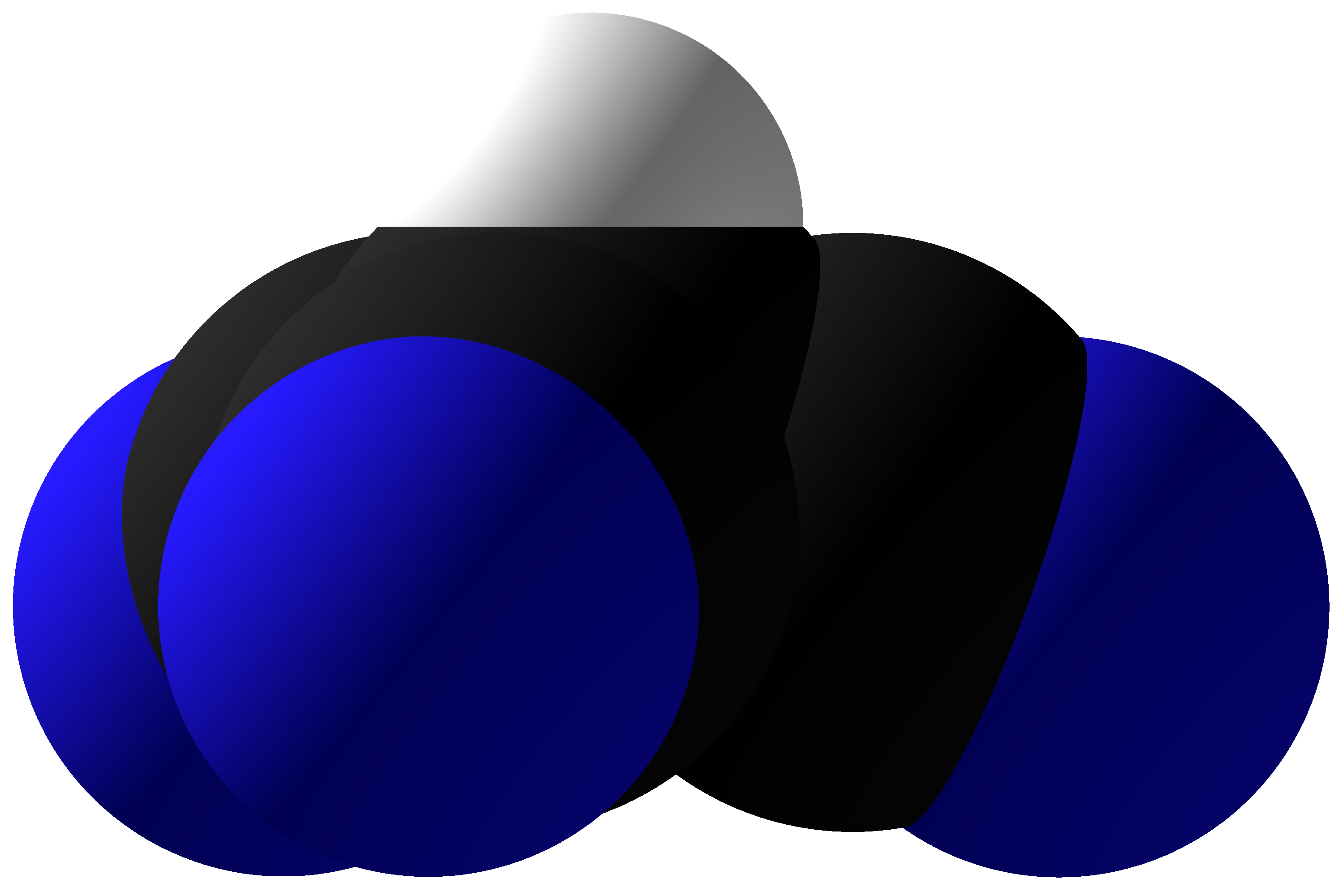

Names
- Preferred IUPAC name Methanetricarbonitrile
- Other names Tricyanomethane

Identifiers
CAS Number	454-50-2
3D model (JSmol)	Interactive image
ChemSpider	4402366
PubChem CID	5232958
CompTox Dashboard (EPA)	DTXSID20411917
- InChI: InChI=1S/C4HN3/c5-1-4(2-6)3-7/h4H Key: HFWIMJHBCIGYFH-UHFFFAOYSA-N; InChI=1/C4HN3/c5-1-4(2-6)3-7/h4H Key: HFWIMJHBCIGYFH-UHFFFAOYAU
- SMILES: C(#N)C(C#N)C#N

Properties
Chemical formula	HC(CN)_{3}
Molar mass	91.073 g·mol^{−1}
Appearance	Colorless liquid
Boiling point	−40 °C (−40 °F; 233 K) (decomposes)
- Except where otherwise noted, data are given for materials in their standard state (at 25 °C [77 °F], 100 kPa). Infobox references

Cyanoform (tricyanomethane) is an organic compound with the chemical formula HC(CN)_{3}. It is a colorless liquid. It is a cyanocarbon and derivative of methane with three cyano groups. For many years, chemists have been unable to isolate this compound as a neat, free acid. However, in September 2015, reports surfaced of a successful isolation.

== Properties ==
Dilute solutions of this acid, as well as its salts, have long been well known. Cyanoform ranks as one of the most acidic of the carbon acids with an estimated pK_{a} of -5.1 in water and measured pK_{a} of 5.1 in acetonitrile. The reaction of sulfuric acid with sodium tricyanomethanide in water (a reaction first tried by H. Schmidtmann in 1896 with inconclusive results) is reported to result in the formation of hydronium tricyanomethanide [H_{3}O]^{+}[C(CN)_{3}]^{−} or the formation of (Z)-3-amino-2-cyano-3-hydroxyacrylamide, (H_{2}N−)(HO−)C=C(−C≡N)(−C(=O)−NH_{2}), depending on the precise conditions. The reaction of HCl gas with sodium tricyanomethanide dissolved in THF is reported to yield 1-chloro-1-amino-2,2-dicyanoethylene ((N≡C−)_{2}C=C(−NH_{2})Cl) and its tautomer.

== Isolation ==
In September 2015 cyanoform was successfully isolated by a team of scientists at LMU Munich. The team discovered that cyanoform was stable at temperatures below −40°C; previous beliefs were that cyanoform was stable at room temperature. The isolation confirmed that cyanoform is a colorless liquid.

== See also ==
- Malononitrile (Dicyanomethane)
- Tetracyanomethane
