= Triflidic acid =

- Triflidic acid

Names
- Preferred IUPAC name [Bis(trifluoromethanesulfonyl)methanesulfonyl]tri(fluoro)methane
- Other names Triflidic acid, tris(triflyl)methane, tris[(trifluoromethyl)sulfonyl]methane

Identifiers
CAS Number	60805-12-1
3D model (JSmol)	Interactive image
ChemSpider	3512136
ECHA InfoCard	100.258.613
PubChem CID	4306514
CompTox Dashboard (EPA)	DTXSID40401774
- InChI: InChI=1S/C4HF9O6S3/c5-2(6,7)20(14,15)1(21(16,17)3(8,9)10)22(18,19)4(11,12)13/h1H Key: MYIAPBDBTMDUDP-UHFFFAOYSA-N
- SMILES: [H]C(S(=O)(C(F)(F)F)=O)(S(=O)(C(F)(F)F)=O)S(=O)(C(F)(F)F)=O

Properties
Chemical formula	C_{4}HF_{9}O_{6}S_{3}
Molar mass	412.21 g·mol^{−1}
Appearance	Colorless solid
Melting point	69.2 °C (156.6 °F; 342.3 K)
Solubility in water	Miscible
Acidity (pK_{a})	–18.6 (aqueous, est.)

Hazards
- Occupational safety and health (OHS/OSH)
Main hazards	Corrosive, eye irritant
- GHS labelling
Pictograms	(GHS05: Corrosive) (GHS07: Exclamation mark)
Signal word	Danger
Hazard statements	H314, H335
Precautionary statements	P260, P264, P271, P280, P301+P330+P331, P303+P361+P353, P304+P340, P305+P351+P338, P310, P312, P321, P363, P403+P233, P405, P501
- Except where otherwise noted, data are given for materials in their standard state (at 25 °C [77 °F], 100 kPa). verify (what is ?) Infobox references

Triflidic acid (IUPAC name: tris[(trifluoromethyl)sulfonyl]methane, abbreviated formula: Tf_{3}CH) is an organic superacid. It is one of the strongest known carbon acids and is among the strongest Brønsted acids in general, with an acidity exceeded only by the carborane acids. Notably, triflidic acid is estimated to have an acidity 10^{4} times that of triflic acid (pK_{a}^{aq} ~ –14), as measured by its acid dissociation constant. It was first prepared in 1987 by Seppelt and Turowsky by the following route:

(1) Tf_{2}CH_{2} + 2 CH_{3}MgBr → Tf_{2}C(MgBr)_{2} + 2 CH_{4}
(2) Tf_{2}C(MgBr)_{2} + TfF → Tf_{3}C(MgBr) + MgBrF
(3) Tf_{3}C(MgBr) + H_{2}SO_{4} → Tf_{3}CH + MgBrHSO_{4}

In its anionic form, the lanthanide salts of triflidic acid ("triflides") have been shown to be more efficient Lewis acids than the corresponding triflates. The triflide anion has also been employed as the anionic component of ionic liquids.

== See also ==
- Bistriflimide
- Non-coordinating anion
