= Pentacyanocyclopentadiene =

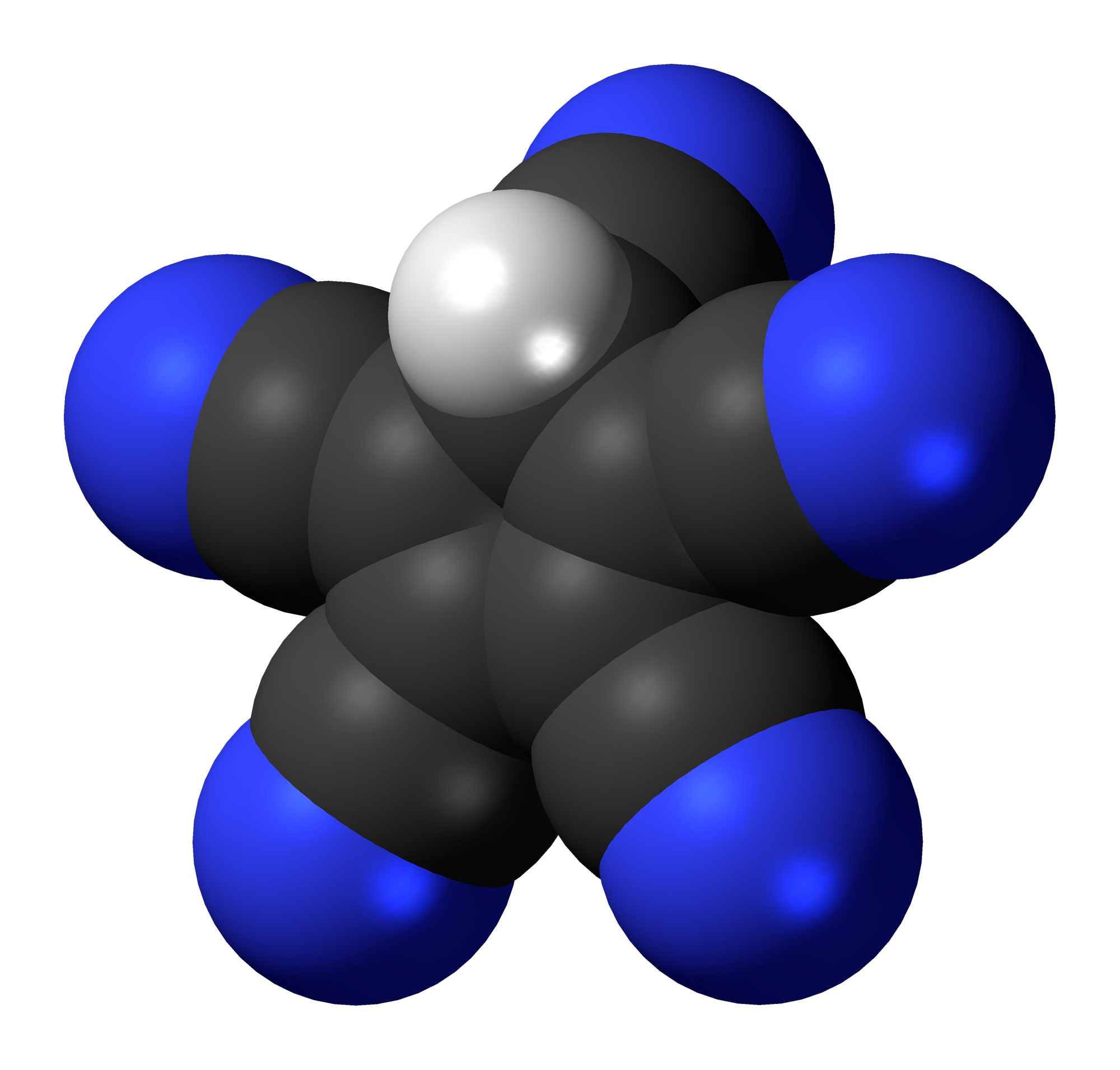

Names
- Preferred IUPAC name Cyclopenta-1,3-diene-1,2,3,4,5-pentacarbonitrile

Identifiers
CAS Number	69239-40-3
3D model (JSmol)	Interactive image
ChemSpider	11484097
PubChem CID	22597206
CompTox Dashboard (EPA)	DTXSID20626741
- InChI: InChI=1S/C10HN5/c11-1-6-7(2-12)9(4-14)10(5-15)8(6)3-13/h6H Key: SZRONZXSOSCLOK-UHFFFAOYSA-N
- SMILES: C(=N)=C1C(=C(C(=C1C#N)C#N)C#N)C#N

Properties
Chemical formula	C_{10}HN_{5}
Molar mass	191.153 g·mol^{−1}
Appearance	Black-brown amorphous solid
- Except where otherwise noted, data are given for materials in their standard state (at 25 °C [77 °F], 100 kPa). Infobox references

Pentacyanocyclopentadiene is a derivative of cyclopentadiene with five cyano groups with the molecular formula C_{5}H(CN)_{5}. The corresponding anion, pentacyanocyclopentadienide, is a ligand with the molecular formula C_{5}(CN)^{−}_{5}. In contrast to other anions based on a C_{5} ring unit it binds to metals through the pendant cyano groups rather than the C_{5} ring. The anion was first synthesised by Webster in the 1960s and its conjugate acid much later on. More recently Wright has discovered its extensive coordination chemistry. By virtue of a combination of mesomeric and aromatic stabilization of its anion, pentacyanocyclopentadiene is a superacid, with an estimated aqueous pK_{a} of −11. The free acid was prepared by Reed in 2004 and was assigned a polymeric structure with protons that bridge planar C_{5}(CN)_{5} units.

== Synthesis ==
Pentacyanocyclopentadiene is synthesised by coupling carbon disulfide and sodium cyanide in dimethylformamide before oxidation using ammonium persulfate and final purification generates the ammonium pentacyanocyclopentadiene salt. Further reaction with sodium hydride generates NaC_{5}(CN)_{5} which is a starting point for its coordination chemistry with transition metals.

== Reactions and coordination chemistry ==
Coupling of sodium pentacyanocyclopentadiene (NaC_{5}(CN)_{5}) with transition metal halide salts generates metal complexes containing the C_{5}(CN)^{−}_{5} anion. Because the anion binds to metals through the cyanide group it can act as a pentagonal node, unlike most cyclopentadienyl complexes that bind to the face of the cyclopentadienyl ring. Thus it can form fullerene-like structures with large voids containing solvent. This has important implications for gas storage and separation.
