= Tetrakis(trimethylsilyl)methane =

Names
- Preferred IUPAC name trimethyl[tris(trimethylsilyl)methyl]silane

Identifiers
CAS Number	1066-64-4
3D model (JSmol)	Interactive image
ChemSpider	63765
EC Number	213-920-4
PubChem CID	70597
UNII	7TZD3Y8WWD
CompTox Dashboard (EPA)	DTXSID2061436
- InChI: InChI=1S/C13H36Si4/c1-14(2,3)13(15(4,5)6,16(7,8)9)17(10,11)12/h1-12H3 Key: WFGTTYMWWMWERB-UHFFFAOYSA-N
- SMILES: C[Si](C)(C)C([Si](C)(C)C)([Si](C)(C)C)[Si](C)(C)C

Properties
Chemical formula	C_{13}H_{36}Si_{4}
Molar mass	304.771 g·mol^{−1}
- Except where otherwise noted, data are given for materials in their standard state (at 25 °C [77 °F], 100 kPa). Infobox references

Tetrakis(trimethylsilyl)methane (TTMSM) is an organic compound with formula C_{13}H_{36}Si_{4}, consisting of four trimethylsilyl (Si(CH_{3})_{3}) groups bonded to a central carbon atom. It is extremely sterically crowded but unlike with the all-carbon equivalent tetra-tert-butylmethane which is only known as a theoretical compound, the longer silicon-carbon bonds allow this compound to be synthesised.
