= Tetracyanomethane =

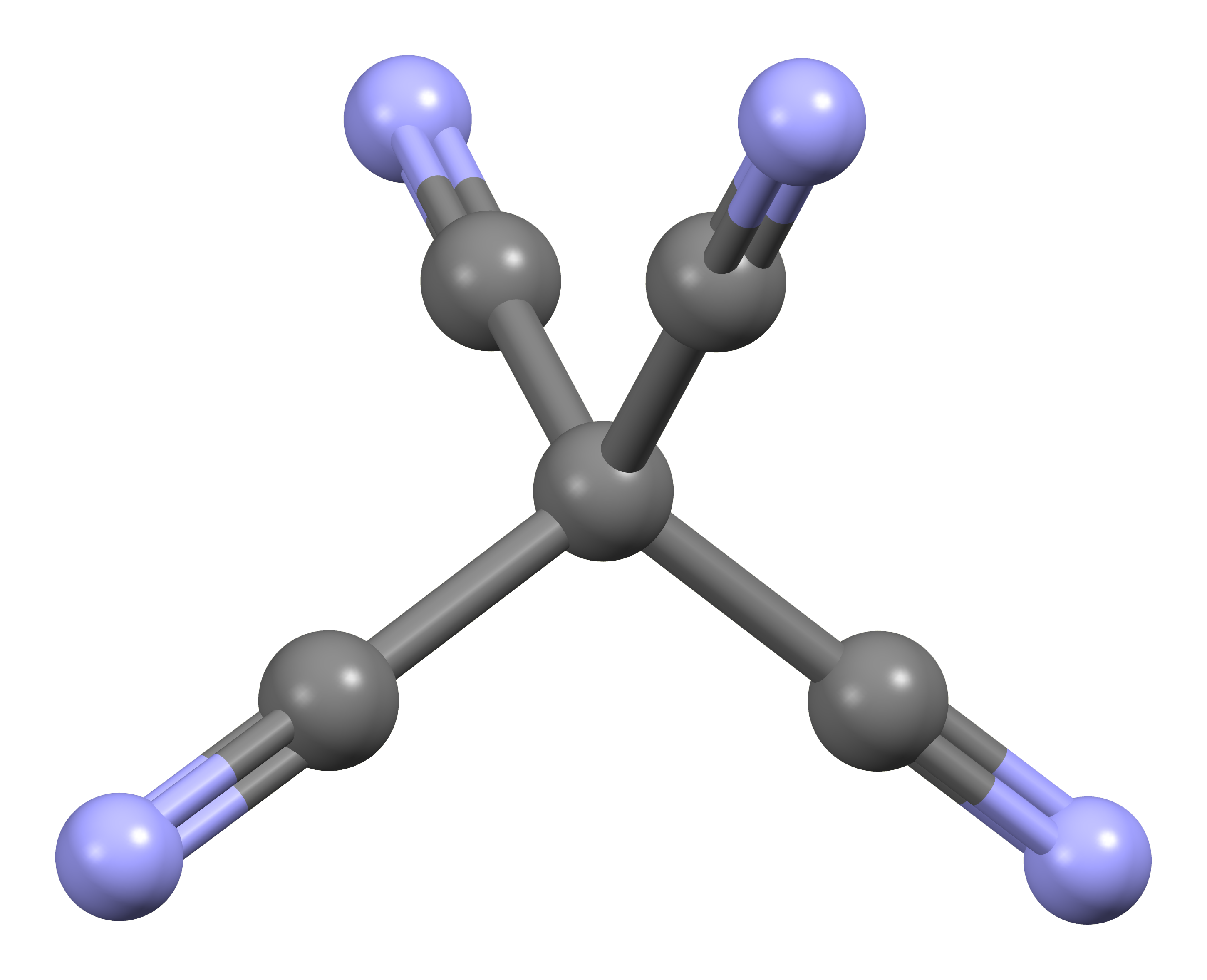

Names
- Preferred IUPAC name Methanetetracarbonitrile
- Other names carbon tetracyanide; 2,2-dicyanomalononitrile

Identifiers
CAS Number	24331-09-7
3D model (JSmol)	Interactive image
ChemSpider	124462
PubChem CID	141101
UNII	K559RM8NV6
CompTox Dashboard (EPA)	DTXSID70179070
- InChI: InChI=1S/C5N4/c6-1-5(2-7,3-8)4-9 Key: XKGUKYPCHPHAJL-UHFFFAOYSA-N
- SMILES: C(#N)C(C#N)(C#N)C#N

Properties
Chemical formula	C(CN)_{4}
Molar mass	116.083 g·mol^{−1}
Appearance	white crystals

Structure
Crystal structure	trigonal
Space group	R3c
Lattice constant	a = 9.062, c = 11.625
Lattice volume (V)	137.8 Å^{3}
Formula units (Z)	6
Molecular shape	tetrahedron

Thermochemistry
Std enthalpy of formation (Δ_{f}H^{⦵}_{298})	−146.2 kcal/mol −612.11 kJ/mol
Heat of combustion, higher value (HHV)	−616.4 kcal/mol −2580.743 kJ/mol
- Except where otherwise noted, data are given for materials in their standard state (at 25 °C [77 °F], 100 kPa). Infobox references

Tetracyanomethane or carbon tetracyanide is an organic compound with the chemical formula C(CN)_{4}. It is a percyanoalkane. It is a molecular carbon nitride. The structure can be considered as methane with all hydrogen atoms replaced by cyanide groups. It was first made by Erwin Mayer in 1969.

== Properties ==
Tetracyanomethane is a solid at room temperature. It decomposes over 160 °C without melting, and although it can be in a dilute vapour, no liquid form is known. The molecules of tetracyanomethane have a tetrahedral symmetry (4̅3m or T_{d}). The molecule has C-C distance of 1.484 Å and C-N distance of 1.161 Å in the gas form. In the solid the C≡N bond shortens to 1.147 Å. The C-C bond has a force constant of 4.86×10^{5} dyn/cm which is slightly greater than the C-Cl bond in carbon tetrachloride, but a fair bit weaker than in the tricyanomethanide ion. At pressures over 7 GPa tetracyanomethane starts to polymerize to form a disorganised covalent network solid. At higher pressure the white colour yellows and darkens to black. Over 20 GPa the polymerization is total.

The bulk modulus K_{0} = 4.4 and its derivative K_{0}' = 18.

== Production ==
Tetracyanomethane can be made by reacting cyanogen chloride with silver tricyanomethanide.

ClCN + AgC(CN)_{3} → C(CN)_{4} + AgCl

== Reactions ==
In an acid solution in water tetracyanomethane is hydrolysed to yield tricyanomethanide and ammonium ions along with carbon dioxide. In alkaline solutions tricyanomethanide and cyanate ions are produced.

== See also ==
- Cyanoform (Tricyanomethane)
- Malononitrile (Dicyanomethane)
- Tetraethynylmethane
