= Tetracyclopropylmethane =

Names
- Preferred IUPAC name 1,1′,1′′,1′′′-Methanetetrayltetracyclopropane

Identifiers
CAS Number	332104-93-5
3D model (JSmol)	Interactive image
ChemSpider	35765346
PubChem CID	57417320
CompTox Dashboard (EPA)	DTXSID90726267
- InChI: InChI=1S/C13H20/c1-2-9(1)13(10-3-4-10,11-5-6-11)12-7-8-12/h9-12H,1-8H2 Key: KXAOPBGXMXVCRN-UHFFFAOYSA-N
- SMILES: C1(CC1)C(C2CC2)(C3CC3)C4CC4

Properties
Chemical formula	C_{13}H_{20}
Molar mass	176.303 g·mol^{−1}
- Except where otherwise noted, data are given for materials in their standard state (at 25 °C [77 °F], 100 kPa). verify (what is ?) Infobox references

Tetracyclopropylmethane is an organic compound, a polycyclic hydrocarbon with formula C_{13}H_{20}, or (C_{3}H_{5}-)_{4}C. The carbon skeleton of its molecule consists of four cyclopropane rings attached to a central carbon atom.

This compound was synthesized in 2001 by Armin de Meijere and others, with dicyclopropyldiethenylmethane as an intermediate step. In the solid state, the molecules have a propeller shape with S4 symmetry.
