= Electron acceptor =

Chemical entity capable of accepting electrons

An electron acceptor is a chemical entity that accepts electrons transferred to it from another compound. Electron acceptors are oxidizing agents.

The electron accepting power of an electron acceptor is measured by its redox potential.

In the simplest case, electron acceptors are reduced by one electron. The process can alter the structure of the acceptor substantially. When the added electron is highly delocalized, the structural consequences of the reduction can be subtle. The central C-C distance in the electron acceptor tetracyanoethylene elongates from 135 to 143 pm upon acceptance of an electron. In the formation of some donor-acceptor complexes, less than one electron is transferred. TTF-TCNQ is a charge transfer complex.

== Biology ==
Paraquat, the dication on the left, functions as an electron acceptor, disrupting respiration in plants.

In biology, a terminal electron acceptor (TEA) often refers to either the last compound to receive an electron in an electron transport chain, such as oxygen during aerobic cellular respiration, or the last cofactor to receive an electron within the electron transfer domain of a reaction center during photosynthesis. All organisms obtain energy by transferring electrons from an electron donor to an electron acceptor; however, there is great diversity in the TEA used.

One practical illustration of the role of electron acceptors in biology is the high toxicity of paraquat (N,N'-dimethyl-4,4'-bipyridinium). The activity of this broad spectrum herbicide results from it acting as a potent electron acceptor. Specifically, paraquat oxidizes ferredoxin, an enzyme in photosynthesis, then regenerates by transferring the electron to molecular oxygen, which creates toxic reactive oxygen species.

== Materials science ==
In some solar cells, the photocurrent entails transfer of electrons from a donor to an electron acceptor.

== See also ==
- Acceptor (semiconductors)
- Redox reaction
- Semiconductor
